= J. W. Arrowsmith Ltd =

Book printer and publisher

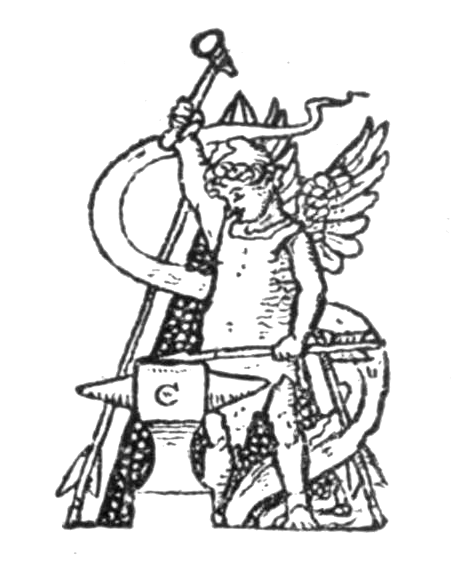
Logo of Arrowsmith as used in 1891

J. W. Arrowsmith Ltd was a book printer and publisher based in Bristol, England. It became a limited company in 1911, having been an unincorporated company named Arrowsmith. It was closed in 2006.

The company published the first edition of the novel Three Men in a Boat by Jerome K. Jerome in 1889. Also published by J. W. Arrowsmith were:

- Called Back by Hugh Conway (1883)
- The Taking of Dover by Horace Francis Lester (1888)
- Diary of a Pilgrimage by Jerome K. Jerome (1891)
- The Great Shadow by Arthur Conan Doyle (1892)
- The Diary of a Nobody by George and Weedon Grossmith (1892)
- Rupert of Hentzau by Anthony Hope (1898)
- Three Men on the Bummel by Jerome K. Jerome (1900)

== History ==
The business began in 1854 when Isaac Arrowsmith moved to Bristol from Worcester. Isaac Arrowsmith was a founder member of the Worcester Typographical Society. Arrowsmith and Hugh Evans, a stationer on Clare Street, published a railway timetable for a penny, an original copy of which is held at the British Museum. When Isaac died in 1871 his son, James Williams Arrowsmith, ventured into general publishing. Arrowsmith's first success came in 1883 with Hugh Conway's ‘Called Back’ was reviewed positively by Henry Labouchère in ’Truth’.

James Arrowsmith was a friend of the famous Bristolian cricketer, WG Grace, and published Grace's book entitled 'Cricket'. Their surviving letters show the process was not a smooth one:

Dear Arrowsmith,
It is very annoying to think you won’t do the little book as I wish. If you do it at all, why not properly? The specimen you have sent is too common a style.
Yours in haste,
WG Grace

In 1930 J W Arrowsmith printed the first of the Bristol Record Society's volumes, with transcriptions of historic records of Bristol, primarily material now held at Bristol Archives. During the Second World War the Arrowsmith's factory hosted seven local competitors whose sites had been destroyed. In 1952 a 27,000 square foot factory on Winterstoke Road, Bristol, was begun, finally alleviating the company's need to expand from the small, inadequate factory on Quay Street. Arrowsmith remains a publishing imprint.

== Book series ==
- Arrowsmith's Bristol Library
- Arrowsmith’s Fiction Favorites (ca. 1924)
- Arrowsmith’s Fiction Series (1943-1948)
- Arrowsmith's Shilling Reprint Series
- Arrowsmith's Six Shilling Series
- Arrowsmith’s Three & Sixpenny Series (1892-1924)
- Arrowsmith’s 2/- Net Novels (1928-1941)
- Arrowsmith's Two Shilling Series
- Broad Arrow Thrillers (1937)

== Archives ==
Most of the records of J. W. Arrowsmith Ltd are held at Bristol Archives (Ref. 40145) (online catalogue) along with copies of many Arrowsmith publications.
