= Called Back (1914 American film) =

1914 film directed by Otis Turner

- Directed by: Otis Turner
- Written by: Hugh Conway (novel); James Dayton
- Starring: Herbert Rawlinson; Ann Little; Allan Forrest
- Production company: Universal Pictures
- Distributed by: Universal Pictures
- Release date: December 1, 1914
- Country: United States
- Languages: Silent; English intertitles

Called Back is a 1914 American silent drama film directed by Otis Turner and starring Herbert Rawlinson, Ann Little and Allan Forrest. It is based on the 1883 novel Called Back by Hugh Conway, which was also adapted into a British film Called Back the same year.

== Cast ==
- Herbert Rawlinson as Gilbert Vaughan
- Ann Little as Pauline March
- Allan Forrest as Anthony March
- William Worthington as Dr. Manuel Ceneri
- William Quinn as Signor Macari

== Bibliography ==
- George A. Katchmer. Eighty Silent Film Stars: Biographies and Filmographies of the Obscure to the Well Known. McFarland, 1991.
