= Grossmith =

Grossmith is a surname. Notable people with the surname include:

- George Grossmith (1847–1912), English comedian, writer, and musician
- Weedon Grossmith (1854–1919), English artist, writer, and actor; younger brother of George Grossmith, Sr.
- George Grossmith, Jr. (1874–1935), British actor and producer; eldest son of George Grossmith
- Lawrence Grossmith (1877–1944), English actor; younger brother of George Grossmith, Jr.
