= Charles Pooter =

Fictional character in The Diary of a Nobody

Charles Pooter as illustrated by Phil Hood (1984)

Charles Pooter is a fictional character, the supposed author and leading character of George and Weedon Grossmith's comic novel The Diary of a Nobody (1892). Pooter is a middle-aged and middle-class clerk in the City of London, with ideas above his station. Apart from taking himself very seriously, he is an extreme example of self-importance, with the unhappy result that he is much snubbed by those he considers beneath him. He has a wife called Carrie (Née Lupin) and a son called William Lupin Pooter, the latter unsuitably engaged to the distressingly inferior Daisy Mutlar.

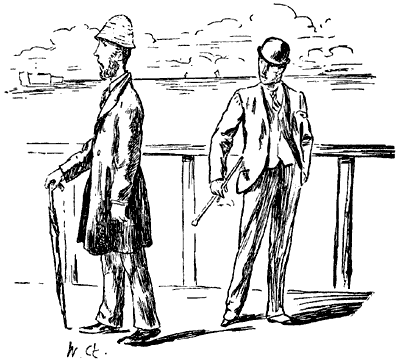
Charles (left) and Lupin Pooter, illustration by Weedon Grossmith from The Diary of a Nobody (1892)

The Pooters live at The Laurels, No. 12 Brickfield Terrace, Holloway, London, in a nice six-roomed residence, not counting basement, with a front breakfast-parlour, a little front garden, and a flight of ten steps up to the front door. A nice little back garden runs down to the railway, which causes no nuisance, other than the cracking up of the garden wall. The exact location of the real "Laurels" had always been a subject of speculation, but in 2008 journalist Harry Mount claimed to have found the original in Pemberton Gardens, a road that cuts from Upper Holloway Road to Junction Road in Archway. Pooter's intimate friends Cummings and Gowing always let themselves in at the side entrance, thus saving the housemaid the trouble of going to the door. He sometimes drinks Madeira.

The character has spawned the word Pooterism (Pooterish, Pooteresque), which means taking oneself far too seriously: believing that one's importance or influence is far greater than it really is.

A 1984 edition of The Diary of a Nobody published by Elm Tree Books included new illustrations by artists Paul Hogarth and Philip Hood, the latter providing a colour caricature of Pooter in the style of the Victorian publication Vanity Fair at the suggestion of the publisher. This showed Pooter in a typical pose carrying business documents while painting the bath with red enamel paint. Based on the illustrations by Weedon Grossmith, Hood's was the first attempt by an artist to create a detailed and realistic portrait of Charles Pooter.

== Portrayals ==
- Bryan Pringle: film by Ken Russell (1964)
- Arthur Lowe: audio version (1977)
- Terrence Hardiman: television adaptation (1979)
- Michael Williams: Garrick Theatre (1986); BBC Radio World Service version (1990)
- Hugh Bonneville: BBC Four version (2007)
- Johnny Vegas: BBC Radio 4 (2012)
