= Uncle Samuel =

Comic Opera by George Grossmith and Arthur Law

Uncle Samuel is a one-act comic opera with a libretto by Arthur Law and music by George Grossmith. It was first produced at the Opera Comique on 3 May 1881 to 8 October 1881, as companion piece to Patience. The piece also toured from December 1887 to June 1888 as a companion piece to H.M.S. Pinafore.

A vocal score was published by Chappells in 1881 containing full libretto, dialogue and music, and a copy is in the British Library.

The fashion in the late Victorian era was to present long evenings in the theatre, and so producer Richard D'Oyly Carte preceded his Savoy operas with curtain raisers such as Uncle Samuel. W. J. MacQueen-Pope commented, concerning such curtain raisers:

This was a one-act play, seen only by the early comers. It would play to empty boxes, half-empty upper circle, to a gradually filling stalls and dress circle, but to an attentive, grateful and appreciative pit and gallery. Often these plays were little gems. They deserved much better treatment than they got, but those who saw them delighted in them. ... [They] served to give young actors and actresses a chance to win their spurs ... the stalls and the boxes lost much by missing the curtain-raiser, but to them dinner was more important.

== Synopsis ==
Jack is Samuel Crow's nephew, whom he threw out of his house many years ago, and who (unbeknown to his uncle) has been brought up by the latter's friend Mr. Daw. Daw has just died and has asked Crow to look after his frumpish daughter Marjorie. Crow lives with his niece Jenny, Jack's cousin, with whom he is in love, but from whom he has concealed his true identity. Jack turns up incognito at his uncle's house on the Thames to hatch a plot to gain Crow's consent to the marriage. When Marjorie arrives, Jenny mistakes her for a flame of Jack's. Eventually, in a rage at Jenny's determination to marry this unknown man, Crow decides to leave all his money not to her, but to his nephew, Jack, whom he thinks he has not seen for many years. He is mortified on learning who this young man really is.

== Musical numbers ==
- No. 1 - Crow – "What is the good of a name."
- No. 2 - Jack and Crow – "Is she dark or fair?"
- No. 3 - Jenny and Margery – "Come, come, compose yourself I pray"
- No. 4 - Jenny, Margery, and Jack – "I'm caught, I'm caught, what an awkward situation"
- No. 5 - Finale: "At last we've arrived at a happy conclusion"

== Cast information ==
The original 1881 cast was:

- Mr. Samuel Crow, an old bachelor. Frank Thornton
- John Bird (alias Jack Sparrow). Arthur Law
- Jenny Wren. Minna Louis
- Margery Daw. Rosina Brandram

The 1887–1888 cast was Kate Kavanagh as Jenny; Nellie Wyatt as Margery; George Willoughby as Bird and Frank Lynne as Crow.
