= Diary of a Pilgrimage =

1891 book by Jerome K. Jerome

- First edition (UK)
- Author: Jerome K. Jerome
- Illustrator: G. G. Fraser
- Language: English
- Genre: Travelogue
- Publisher: J. W. Arrowsmith (UK); Henry Holt and Co. (US)
- Publication date: 1891
- Publication place: United Kingdom
- Media type: Print (Hardback & Paperback)
- OCLC: 2728522

Diary of a Pilgrimage is a humorous fictionalised travelogue by Jerome K. Jerome. It tells of Jerome's first visit to Germany, a trip he undertakes with his friend "B" to see the Oberammergau Passion Play.

== Publishing history ==
The diary was originally serialised in The Daily Graphic in 1890. It was first published in book form in 1891, by J.W. Arrowsmith, in a volume also containing six essays and more than 120 illustrations by G.G. Fraser.

The six essays included in the 1891 volume are "Evergreens", "Clocks", "Tea-Kettles", "A Pathetic Story", "The New Utopia", and "Dreams". Later editions have sometimes retained the diary and essays in the same volume and have sometimes separated the diary and the essays into separate volumes.

== Reception ==
An early review in The Atlantic Monthly was unimpressed: "High spirits confused by vigorous effort at sentiment and subsequent exhaustion characterize this book like others of the writer's production. ... There is humor in the book, yet so slouchy is the style that, after reading it, one finds Mark Twain severe and Burnand a classic to be examined in."

Another early review, from The Literary World, was more resigned: "The volume, we have no doubt, will find favour in the eyes of his numerous admirers. It is a book to read, hardly one to criticise. You either accept it on its merits and enjoy it, or you leave severely alone."

Punch mocked the "'ARRY Abroad" narrator, and found that a little of him "goes a great way, and this Cockney pilgrim goes too far, especially when giving us his valuable opinion on the Passion Play". Punch also criticised the decision to pad out of the book with essays.

The Bookseller, in a slightly more positive review, described the diary as Jerome making "merry more suo with the incidents and accidents of Continental travel" and found the six essays as written "in quite his lightest and raciest way". It added that the illustrations "are numerous and worthy of the text".

== Narrative ==
=== Itinerary ===
The diary describes the pair travelling by train from London Victoria to Dover. After a rough overnight crossing of the English Channel to Ostend they travel by train to Cologne where they spend a night in a hotel. The following day they visit Cologne Cathedral before catching the train to Munich, travelling alongside the Rhine. They spend Sunday in Munich where Jerome practices his German before catching a train to Oberau and then a carriage to Oberammergau to see the play. They return via Heidelberg.

=== Asides ===
As well as describing the journey and the characters they meet the diary also contains a number of humorous asides including:

- "The Question of Luggage" - conflicting advice on what to pack for the trip
- "A Playful Boat" - the effects of seasickness
- "The German Bed"
- "The German Railway Guard"
- "We Seek Breakfast" - an attempt to order a savoury omelette
- "A Faithful Bradshaw"
- "The Difficulty of Dining to Music"
