= Archibald Fargus =

English cricketer and rugby union footballer

Personal information
- Full name: Archibald Hugh Conway Fargus
- Born: 15 December 1878; Clifton, Bristol, England
- Died: 6 October 1963 (aged 84); Eastville, Bristol, England
- Batting: Right-handed
- Bowling: Right-arm fast

Domestic team information
- Years: Team
- 1904: Devon
- 1900–1901: Cambridge University
- 1900–1901: Gloucestershire

Career statistics
Competition	First-class
Matches	28
Runs scored	507
Batting average	12.07
100s/50s	–/1
Top score	61
Balls bowled	3,523
Wickets	60
Bowling average	34.13
5 wickets in innings	2
10 wickets in match	1
Best bowling	7/55
Catches/stumpings	19/–
- Source: Cricinfo, 15 April 2011

Rev. Archibald Hugh Conway Fargus MA (15 December 1878 – 6 October 1963) was an English cricketer who was a right-handed batsman who bowled right-arm fast. He was also a scholar and clergyman and served in the Royal Navy.

== Early life and cricket ==
Born in Clifton, Bristol, Fargus was the son of novelist Frederick John Fargus and Amy Spark. He was later educated at Clifton College and Haileybury before attending Pembroke College, Cambridge.

Fargus made his first-class debut for Gloucestershire in the 1900 County Championship against Middlesex. In that same season he also made his first-class debut for Cambridge University against Surrey. Fargus played first-class cricket for both teams in 1900 and 1901, typically playing for Cambridge University in the months of June and July and for Gloucestershire in August. He played 12 matches for the University, from whom he won a Cambridge Blue in 1900 and 1901, and 15 for Gloucestershire, plus one match for the Gentlemen in 1900.

Overall, Fargus was a superior batsman while playing for Cambridge University, scoring 292 runs at a batting average of 16.22, plus scoring his only half century in first-class cricket, a score of 61. For Gloucestershire he batted in 27 innings, scoring 210 runs at an average of 9.13. With the ball, the reverse was true; his bowling with Gloucestershire was more successful. For the county he took 33 wickets at a bowling average of 26.54, with best figures of 7/55, one of two five wicket hauls he took. His best figures came in his debut match against Middlesex, with the 7/55 coming in the Middlesex second-innings and following on from the 5/32 in their first-innings. These figures were the best by any player on debut in the County Championship at that time, it would be a record which would stand for 14 years, until it was beaten by Cec Parkin who took match figures of 14/99 on his Lancashire County Cricket Club debut in 1914 In contrast, for the University he took 27 wickets at an average of 41.66, with best figures of 4/35.

His first-class career ended at the end of the 1901 season. However, in 1904 he represented Devon in that season's Minor Counties Championship, playing a single match against Glamorgan.

Outside of cricket, Fargus played rugby for Devon.

== Naval career and later life ==
The Rev. A. H. C. Fargus was not lost, as stated in the Press, in Admiral Cradock's flagship, the Monmouth, on 1 November 1914. Missing a train, he was prevented from re-joining the ship just before it left for the Pacific and was appointed to another.

— Wisden Cricketers' Almanack of 1916 informing readers that Fargus was alive and well.

Fargus was ordained by the Bishop of Winchester in 1906. He initially took up duties at Forton, Hampshire. He joined the Royal Navy in 1907 as a Chaplain, serving aboard HMS Encounter from 1908 to 1910, HMS Jupiter in 1910 and 1911, HMS Prince George in 1911 and 1912, HMS Zealandia in 1912 and HMS Prince of Wales in 1912 and 1913. In 1913 he was appointed as the vicar of Askham Richard, Yorkshire. In order to take up this post he allowed to withdraw from the Royal Navy with a gratuity. Later in the First World War he rejoined the navy, where he served as a Temporary Chaplain on board HMS Monmouth and was seemingly present during its sinking in the battle Battle of Coronel in the Pacific. Indeed, Wisden Cricketers' Almanack included an obituary for him in its 1915 edition. But by a quirk of fate he missed the train and was thus unable to board the ship, instead being posted to another. He remained a Temporary Chaplain until 1919.

He later became Chancellor of St. Paul's Anglican Cathedral in Valletta, Malta from 1919 to 1923. Later in 1923, Fargus took the post of Chaplain in Huelva, Spain, a position he held until 1925. By 1941 he was resident at Horfield rectory in Bristol. He died in Eastville, Bristol on 6 October 1963. Unlike his 'death' in 1914, his actual death was not reported in the 1964 Wisden Cricketers' Almanack and his obituary did not appear until the 1994 edition.
