= Alexander Law =

English cricketer

Personal information
- Full name: Alexander Patrick Law
- Born: 14 January 1832; Northrepps, Norfolk, England
- Died: 30 October 1895 (aged 63); Kew, Surrey, England
- Batting: Right-handed
- Bowling: Right-arm roundarm medium

Domestic team information
- Years: Team
- 1855–1857: Oxford University
- 1858–1866: Marylebone Cricket Club

Career statistics
| Competition | First-class |
|---|---|
| Matches | 19 |
| Runs scored | 488 |
| Batting average | 15.74 |
| 100s/50s | –/1 |
| Top score | 59 |
| Balls bowled | 1,020 |
| Wickets | 19 |
| Bowling average | 27.15 |
| 5 wickets in innings | 1 |
| 10 wickets in match | – |
| Best bowling | 5/72 |
| Catches/stumpings | 5/– |
- Source: Cricinfo, 14 August 2019

Alexander Patrick Law (14 January 1832 – 30 October 1895) was an English first-class cricketer.

The son of the Reverend Patrick Comerford Law and his wife Frances Law (née Arbuthnot), he was born in January 1832 at Northrepps, Norfolk. He was educated at Rugby School, before going up to Corpus Christi College, Oxford in 1851 as a commoner at New Hall Inn. While studying at Oxford, he made his debut in first-class cricket for the Gentlemen of England against the Gentlemen of Kent at Lord's. Four years into his studies at Oxford, Law made his debut for Oxford University in first-class matches against the Marylebone Cricket Club (MCC). He played first-class cricket three times in 1856 for the Gentlemen of England against various combined gentlemen teams. He appeared in two first-class matches for Oxford University in 1857, against the MCC and Cambridge University in The University Match, as well as appearing for the Gentlemen of England against the Gentlemen of Kent and Sussex.

After graduating from Oxford, he made several first-class appearances for the MCC, the Gentlemen of England and the Gentlemen of the North. Law played a total of nineteen first-class matches, scoring 488 runs at an average of 15.74 and a high score of 59. With his right-arm roundarm medium bowling, he took 19 wickets at a bowling average of 27.15, with best figures of 5 for 72. He later died at Kew in October 1895. His brother was the playwright Arthur Law.
