= Cups and Saucers =

Satirical musical sketch by George Grossmith

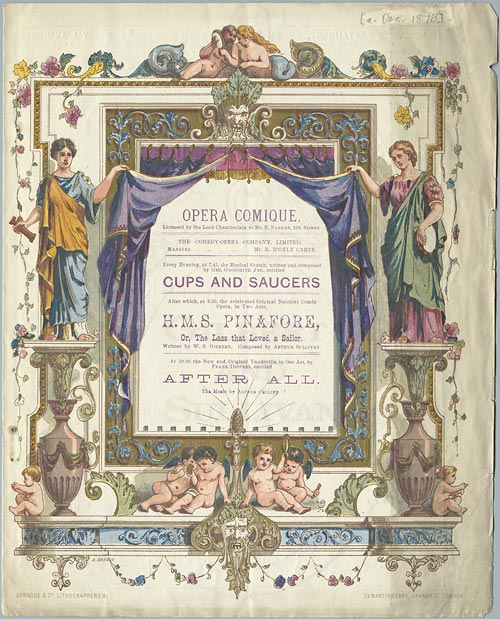
1878 programme cover

Cups and Saucers is a one-act "satirical musical sketch" written and composed by George Grossmith. The piece pokes fun at the china collecting craze of the later Victorian era, which was part of the Aesthetic movement later satirised in Patience and The Colonel. The story of the sketch involves an engaged man and woman who each schemes to sell off the other's purportedly valuable china.

Cups and Saucers premiered in 1876 as part of an evening of piano sketches by Grossmith and was adopted by the D'Oyly Carte Opera Company in 1878 as a curtain raiser to H.M.S. Pinafore and, later, other operas.

== Background and productions ==
Cups and Saucers was first produced in 1876 on tour as a vehicle for Grossmith and Florence Marryat, as part of Entre Nous, their series of piano sketches. It was then performed by the D'Oyly Carte Opera Company from August 1878 to February 1880 at the Opera Comique as a curtain raiser to H.M.S. Pinafore. It was also toured by that company in 1883 (with Iolanthe) and in 1884 and was revived in 1890 at the Globe Theatre (from 6 to 12 December for 6 performances, as the curtain raiser to Richard Temple's production of Gounod's The Mock Doctor). The piece was recorded by Retrospect Opera in 2016, with Simon Butteriss as General Deelah and Gaynor Keeble as Mrs. Worcester, together with F. C. Burnand and Edward Solomon's Pickwick.

The piece runs about 25 minutes. The fashion in the late Victorian era was to present long evenings in the theatre, and so producer Richard D'Oyly Carte preceded his Savoy operas with curtain raisers such as Cups and Saucers. W. J. MacQueen-Pope commented, concerning such curtain raisers:

This was a one-act play, seen only by the early comers. It would play to empty boxes, half-empty upper circle, to a gradually filling stalls and dress circle, but to an attentive, grateful and appreciative pit and gallery. Often these plays were little gems. They deserved much better treatment than they got, but those who saw them delighted in them. ... [They] served to give young actors and actresses a chance to win their spurs ... the stalls and the boxes lost much by missing the curtain-raiser, but to them dinner was more important.

== Synopsis ==
The recently widowed Emily Nankeen Worcester and General Edwin Deelah intend to marry each other, feigning love, but each is secretly interested in the other's purportedly valuable collection of "rare" china, which they plan to sell upon marriage. Mrs. Worcester is in her morning room anticipating a visit from General Deelah. She recounts how she came to own the single but highly valuable item in her china collection ("A Friend Most Dear"), the sole remaining saucer from Julius Caesar's favorite tea service, appraised at ten thousand pounds.

General Deelah arrives, and, after some shy conversation and gentle flirting, the conversation turns to their china collections. Mrs. Worcester notes that she has but one small saucer and inquires of the General's china collection. Deelah boasts that he has a very large collection of china, but states in an aside, "--in China." He quickly changes the subject by asking, "Would it surprise you to learn that I am related to the Chinese?" He then sings of an extravagantly wealthy Chinese merchant named Foo Choo Chan who wished nothing more than to be English ("Foo Choo Chan Was a Merchant of Japan"). The relationship turned out to be Foo Choo Chan's marriage to the "sister of [Deelah's] brother's second aunt, by an uncle on [Deelah's] grandmother's side."

Deelah professes his love for Mrs. Worcester, whereupon she pretends to have fainted until she spots him snooping around for her famed Julius Caesar saucer. She then "recovers" and announces that since she is Deelah's true love, she can now reveal her most prized possession to him. To Deelah's horror, he finds that it is a counterfeit – of his own make – which he admits to Mrs. Worcester. To her horror, he also admits that his own collection of china is his own make as well. She orders Deelah to leave, and Deelah bids her farewell, attempting to make her regret her decision ("The Farewell Song"). Deelah then admits that he never had any real interest in china, but that society had forced him "with the alternative of being thought vulgar, to pretend an affection for its inartistic, ugly beauties at which [his] true soul actually revolts!" Deelah further explains:

A set of vagabonds who infest England have bought up every bit of Oriental ware, are doctoring it up, making it look dirty, cracking it, and then palming it off on would be fashionable folks as real oriental ware. One little town in Japan had been completely cleaned out of every cup and saucer, and the poor Japanese were compelled to drink their tea out of ink bottles and blacking pots. I could not bear to see this. So I started a firm for the manufacture of English china to supply the wants of the natives, and I flatter myself I am doing very well.

General Deelah once again proposes to Mrs. Worcester, who agrees, and they decide to "give up old china and live in Japan, and make cups and saucers as fast as we can" ("We'll Give Up Old China and Live in Japan").

== Song list ==
- No. 1. My Little Saucer
- No. 2. Foo Choo Chan
- No. 3. The "Farewell Song"
- No. 4. We'll Give Up Old China

== Roles and Opera Comique casts ==
1878 cast:

- Mrs. Nankeen Worcester, a china maniac – Emily Cross
- General Edwin Deelah, another – Richard Temple
- Jane, the maid – Rose Hervey (a non-singing role, and in some versions, does not speak)

1879 cast:

- Mrs. Worcester – Emily Cross
- General Deelah – Frank Thornton
- Jane – Rose Hervey

A programme, dated 20 January 1880, in the possession of the Theatre Museum, lists Madge Stavart as a replacement for Emily Cross.
