= The Diary of a Nobody =

1892 comic novel by George and Weeden Grossmith

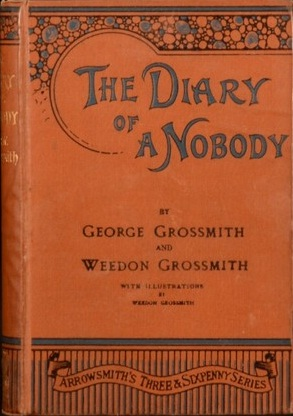
- Cover of the first book edition
- Author: George and Weedon Grossmith
- Illustrator: Weedon Grossmith
- Language: English
- Publisher: J. W. Arrowsmith Ltd, London
- Publication date: June 1892
- Publication place: United Kingdom
- Text: The Diary of a Nobody at Wikisource

The Diary of a Nobody is an 1892 English comic novel written by the brothers George and Weedon Grossmith, with illustrations by the latter. It originated as an intermittent serial in Punch magazine in 1888–89 and first appeared in book form, with extended text and added illustrations, in 1892. The Diary records the daily events in the lives of a London clerk, Charles Pooter, his wife Carrie, his son William Lupin, and numerous friends and acquaintances over a period of 15 months.

Before their collaboration on the Diary, the brothers each pursued successful careers on the stage. George originated nine of the principal comedian roles in Gilbert and Sullivan operas over 12 years from 1877 to 1889. He also established a national reputation as a piano sketch entertainer and wrote a large number of songs and comic pieces. Before embarking on his stage career, Weedon had worked as an artist and illustrator. The Diary was the brothers' only mature collaboration. Most of its humour derives from Charles Pooter's unconscious and unwarranted sense of his own importance, and the frequency with which this delusion is punctured by gaffes and minor social humiliations. In an era of rising expectations within the lower-middle classes, the daily routines and modest ambitions described in the Diary were instantly recognised by its contemporary readers, and provided later generations with a glimpse of the past that it became fashionable to imitate.

Although its initial public reception was muted, the Diary came to be recognised by critics as a classic work of humour, and it has never been out of print. It helped to establish a genre of humorous popular fiction based on lower or lower-middle class aspirations, and was the forerunner of numerous fictitious diary novels in the later 20th century. The Diary has been the subject of several stage and screen adaptations, including Ken Russell's "silent film" treatment of 1964, a four-part TV film scripted by Andrew Davies in 2007, and a widely praised stage version in 2011, in which an all-male cast of three played all the parts.

== Authorship and origin ==
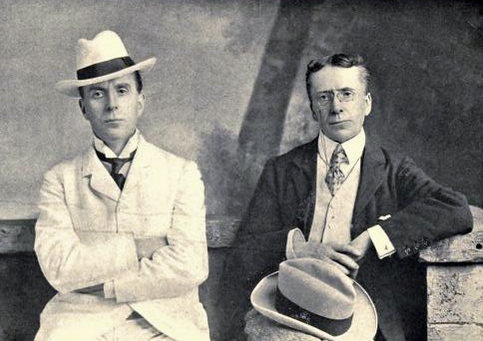
George (right) and Weedon Grossmith

The Diary of a Nobody was the work of George Grossmith and his brother Weedon Grossmith, the sons of a court reporter and part-time stage entertainer, also named George. The younger George followed his father, first as a reporter and later on the stage; the 7-years-younger Weedon studied at the West London School of Art and had some success as a portrait painter before becoming a comic actor. The brothers were fascinated with the stage at an early age. In 1864, at 17 and 10, they hosted a complex programme of musical and dramatic entertainment in their parents' garden at Haverstock Hill. This included a 20-minute burlesque version of Hamlet, in which George played the title role; Weedon was Ophelia.

By 1877 the younger George Grossmith had established himself as a comic piano sketch entertainer in provincial institutes and literary societies. In that year he was seen by Arthur Sullivan and, separately, by W. S. Gilbert, in performances of their one-act comic opera Trial by Jury. Impressed, they engaged him to play the comic lead in their new, full-length work, The Sorcerer. Thereafter, Grossmith created the leading comic role in each of Gilbert and Sullivan's long-running comic operas until The Yeomen of the Guard, which closed in 1889. While appearing in the operas, Grossmith continued his piano entertainment career at private parties and matinees, writing and composing his own material. He became the most successful comic entertainer of his day, writing numerous operettas, around 100 piano sketches, some 600 songs and short piano pieces, and three books. For Punch magazine in 1884 he provided a series of short sketches based on his experiences as a court reporter at Bow Street Magistrates' Court. In 1889, Grossmith ended his connection with Gilbert and Sullivan to pursue his piano sketch career full-time and continued to perform until 1908. He died in 1912.

As an artist Weedon Grossmith exhibited at the Royal Academy and at the Grosvenor Gallery. He also contributed illustrations to Punch and the prestigious Art Journal. He was nevertheless dissatisfied with his financial prospects as an artist, and by 1885 was pursuing an alternative career as an actor. He continued his career on the stage with considerable success until 1918, making his name playing roles he described as "cowards, cads and snobs", and as browbeaten small men under the thumb of authority. He wrote several plays, of which The Night of the Party (1901) was his most successful, and from 1894 was engaged in the management of two West End theatres. He died in 1919. The literary scholar Peter Morton, who published an annotated edition of the Diary in 2009, suggests that many of the events depicted in it were drawn from the brothers' own home experiences, and that Weedon, "something of a scapegrace compared with his perfectionist brother", was the model for Lupin.

== Synopsis ==
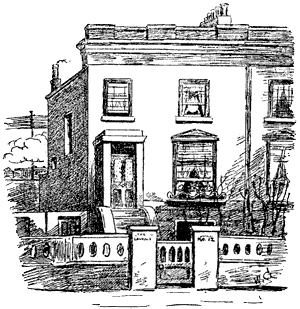
"The Laurels", "a nice six-roomed residence, not counting basement"

The diary begins on 3 April of an unstated year, and runs for approximately 15 months. In a short prologue, readers are informed that Charles Pooter and his wife Caroline (Carrie) have just moved to a new home at "The Laurels", Brickfield Terrace, Holloway. Mr Pooter works as a clerk in the City firm of Perkupp's. The couple's 20-year-old son William works as a bank clerk in Oldham. The first entries describe the Pooters' daily lives and introduce their particular friends, such as their neighbour Gowing, the enthusiastic bicyclist Cummings, and the Jameses from Sutton. From the beginning a pattern is set whereby the small vexations of the Pooters' daily lives are recounted, many of them arising from Pooter's unconscious self-importance and pomposity. Trouble with servants, tradesmen, and office juniors occur regularly, along with minor social embarrassments and humiliations.

The rare formal social events in the Pooters' lives are particular magnets for misfortune. They receive an invitation from the Lord Mayor of London to attend a ball at the Mansion House for "Representatives of Trade and Commerce". After days of keen anticipation they are dismayed, when they arrive, to find that the gathering is undistinguished. Pooter is snobbishly upset to be greeted familiarly by his local ironmonger, even more so when this tradesman appears to be on social terms with some of the more important guests. Pooter overindulges in champagne and humiliates Carrie by collapsing on the dance floor.

In the summer their son arrives from Oldham and informs his parents that he wishes henceforth to be called by his middle name, "Lupin". He has been dismissed from his bank post for idleness; although dismayed, Pooter sees this as a chance to get his son into Perkupp's. Lupin joins the couple for their annual holiday week in Broadstairs, but relationships are strained by Lupin's "fast" habits. On their return, Pooter's efforts to find Lupin a job at first prove fruitless. The boy is interested in amateur dramatics and joins an organisation called the "Holloway Comedians". With the help of Pooter's employer Mr. Perkupp, Lupin finally secures a clerical position with a firm of stockbrokers in November. He then shocks his parents by announcing his engagement.

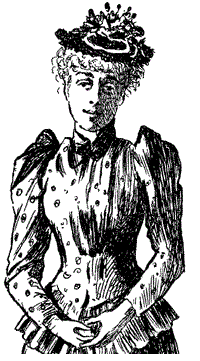
Daisy Mutlar

Lupin's fiancée, Daisy Mutlar, is the sister of one of his theatrical friends and is, he says, "the nicest, prettiest, and most accomplished girl he ever met". Pooter is disappointed when he meets her: "She is a big young woman... at least eight years older than Lupin. I did not even think her good-looking". Nevertheless, in her honour the Pooters give a large dinner-party, to which Pooter invites Mr Perkupp. The party becomes boisterous; Mr Perkupp arrives at a particularly raucous moment, and decides not to stay. Pooter believes the party has failed, and is despondent, although Carrie deems it a great success. However, within a few days, Lupin informs them that the engagement is off.

In the following weeks Lupin often brings the Holloway troupe back to "The Laurels". These occasions are graced with the unexplained presence of a complete stranger, Mr Padge, who regularly occupies the best chair as if by right. Lupin opts out of the family's Christmas celebrations, and then announces, to everyone's astonishment, that the engagement to Daisy is back on. Christmas passes happily enough, despite a supper party which degenerates into a food fight instigated by Daisy.

In the New Year, Pooter is promoted to senior clerk at Perkupp's, and his salary raised by £100 a year, but his achievement is overshadowed by Lupin's announcement that he has just profited by £200 through a timely shares speculation. Lupin persuades his father, and Gowing and Cummings, to invest small sums in Parachikka Chlorates, the source of his gains. The Pooters meet a new friend of Lupin's, Mr Murray Posh, who Pooter thinks is somewhat over-familiar with Daisy and might, he warns Lupin, be a rival for her hand. Lupin pooh-poohs this notion. Later, Pooter learns that he and his friends have lost their investment; indeed, Lupin's stockbroking firm has collapsed entirely and its principal has fled. Lupin is thus unemployed; worse, that same day the engagement of Daisy Mutlar to Murray Posh is announced. Lupin's only consolation, he tells his father, is that he persuaded Posh to invest £600 in Parachikka Chlorates. However, in Pooter's eyes the situation is redeemed when Mr Perkupp offers Lupin a clerkship.

April begins with another social disaster. The Pooters receive an invitation to a ball given by the East Acton Rifle Brigade, which they imagine will be a glittering occasion. It turns out to be shabby and down-at-heel; furthermore, having liberally supplied fellow-guests—among them Mr Padge—with food and drink which he thinks is free, Pooter is presented at the end with a large bill that he can barely afford to pay. Other social events also turn sour: a lunch party with Mr Finsworth, the father of an old friend, is marred by some unfortunate comments by Pooter on the Finsworth family portraits. On another occasion they meet a loud and over-opinionated American, Mr Hardfur Huttle, who, Pooter realises, is like a mature version of Lupin.

Lupin is sacked from Perkupp's for persuading their top client, Mr Crowbillon, to take his business to another firm. Pooter is mortified, but the new firm rewards Lupin with a £25 commission and a job at £200 a year. Lupin resumes his friendship with Murray Posh and Daisy, who is now Mrs Posh. Lupin moves to lodgings in Bayswater, where Pooter and Carrie are invited to dine and where they meet Murray's sister, known as "Lillie Girl", a woman of around 30. Pooter learns that Murray Posh has settled £10,000 on both Daisy and "Lillie Girl".

Pooter is summoned to meet Hardfur Huttle, who offers Perkupp's a new client to replace Mr Crowbillon. Perkupp is so grateful to Pooter for this introduction that he buys up the freehold of "The Laurels" and presents the deeds to Pooter. As the couple celebrate, a letter arrives from Lupin announcing his engagement to "Lillie Girl": "We shall be married in August, and among our guests we hope to see your old friends Gowing and Cummings".

== Publication and reception history ==
The first instalment in Punch (1888)

The Diary made its initial appearance as an intermittent serial in the satirical weekly magazine Punch. The first of the 26 instalments was announced in the issue of 26 May 1888 with a brief editorial note: "As everybody who is anybody is publishing Reminiscences, Diaries, Notes, Autobiographies, and Recollections, we are sincerely grateful to 'A Nobody' for permitting us to add to the historic collection". The diary entry dates are several weeks behind the dates on which they appear in Punch. The Punch serialisation ended in May 1889 with the diary entry for 21 March, which records the Pooters and their friends celebrating the minor triumph of Lupin's appointment as a clerk at Perkupp's. That was the intended end of the diary; however, when the writers were preparing the manuscript for publication as a book, they added a further four months' entries to the text, and included 26 illustrations by Weedon Grossmith.

In June 1892 J.W. Arrowsmith Ltd published the Diary in book form, although its critical and popular success was not evident until the third edition appeared in October 1910. After the First World War the book's popularity continued to grow; regular reprintings and new editions ensured that thereafter the book was never out of print. Audiobook versions have been available since 1982. The writer Robert McCrum, in a personal list of "The 100 greatest novels of all time" published in The Observer newspaper, listed the Diary at number 35.

=== Early indifference ===
"It is not so funny that an occasional interruption would be resented, and such thread of story as runs through it can be grasped and followed without much strain on the attention ... it is rather difficult to get really interested in the sayings and doings of either the Pooter family or their friends."

— Review of The Diary of a Nobody, The Literary World, 29 July 1892.

The Punch serialisation attracted little critical comment; The Athenaeum's literary critic thought the series "may have escaped unnoticed amid better jokes". When the Diary was published as a book, Punch heralded it in its issue of 23 July 1892 as "very funny", adding: "not without a touch of pathos". However, apart from a warmly approving report in The Saturday Review, the book's initial critical reception was lukewarm. The Review's critic thought the book "admirable, and in some of its touches [it] goes close to genius", with a natural and irresistible appeal: "The Diary has amused us from cover to cover". This contrasted with the negative judgement of The Athenaeum, which opined that "the book has no merit to compensate for its hopeless vulgarity, not even that of being amusing". It questioned the tastefulness of jokes aimed almost exclusively at the poverty of underpaid city clerks, and concluded: "Besides, it is all so dull". The Speaker's critic thought the book "a study in vulgarity", while The New York Times, reviewing the first American edition, found the work largely incomprehensible: "There is that kind of quiet, commonplace, everyday joking in it which we are to suppose is highly satisfactory to our cousins across the water ... Our way of manufacturing fun is different". Although details of sales figures are not given, Arrowsmiths later acknowledged that the early editions of the book did not have a wide public impact.

=== Growing reputation ===
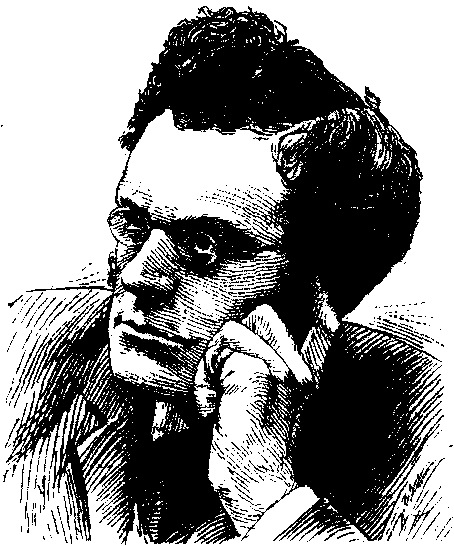
Augustine Birrell, the Edwardian cabinet minister, was one of the Diary's greatest admirers.

By 1910 the Diary was beginning to achieve a reputation in London's literary and political circles. In his essay "On People in Books", published earlier that year, the writer and humourist Hilaire Belloc hailed the Diary as "one of the half-dozen immortal achievements of our time ... a glory for us all". Among others who recorded their appreciation of the work were Lord Rosebery, the former prime minister, who told Arrowsmiths that he thought he had "purchased and given away more copies than any living man ... I regard any bedroom I occupy as unfurnished without a copy of it". Another essayist-cum-politician who added his tribute was Augustine Birrell, who in 1910 occupied the cabinet post of Chief Secretary for Ireland. Birrell wrote that he ranked Charles Pooter alongside Don Quixote as a comic literary figure, and added a note of personal pride that one of the characters in the book—"an illiterate charwoman, it is true"—carried his name. Arrowsmiths printed these appreciations as prefaces in the 1910 and subsequent issues. The 1910 edition proved immediately popular with the reading public, and was followed by numerous reprintings. (Note: The 1919 edition lists nine reprintings between the third edition (1910) and the fourth in 1919. Peter Morton has noted that "the history of the early book editions of the Diary is tangled, due to the unwillingness of the publisher to distinguish between an edition and an impression". This has created inconsistencies in later edition numbering.) In its review of this edition The Bookman's critic wrote of Charles Pooter: "You laugh at him—at his small absurdities, his droll mishaps, his well-meaning fussiness; but he wins upon you and obtains your affection, and even your admiration, he is so transparently honest, so delightfully and ridiculously human".

In its review of the book's fourth edition, published in 1919, The Bookman observed that the book was now a firm favourite with the public. "It has had many imitators ... but not one of them has rivalled the original, and they have all faded away". The reviewer recommended the book's "quaint drollery, its whimsical satire and delightfully quiet irony". In Canada, Queen's Quarterly magazine's sympathetic reception of the book contrasted with that of The New York Times nearly 30 years previously. It praises the understated but lovable self-portrait of Pooter, and adds that "It is not till the second or third reading—and you are bound to reread it—that the really consummate art of this artless book becomes apparent". The literary critic D. B. Wyndham Lewis summarised the Pooters as "warm, living, breathing, futile, half-baked, incredibly alive and endearing boneheads".

=== Acclaim ===
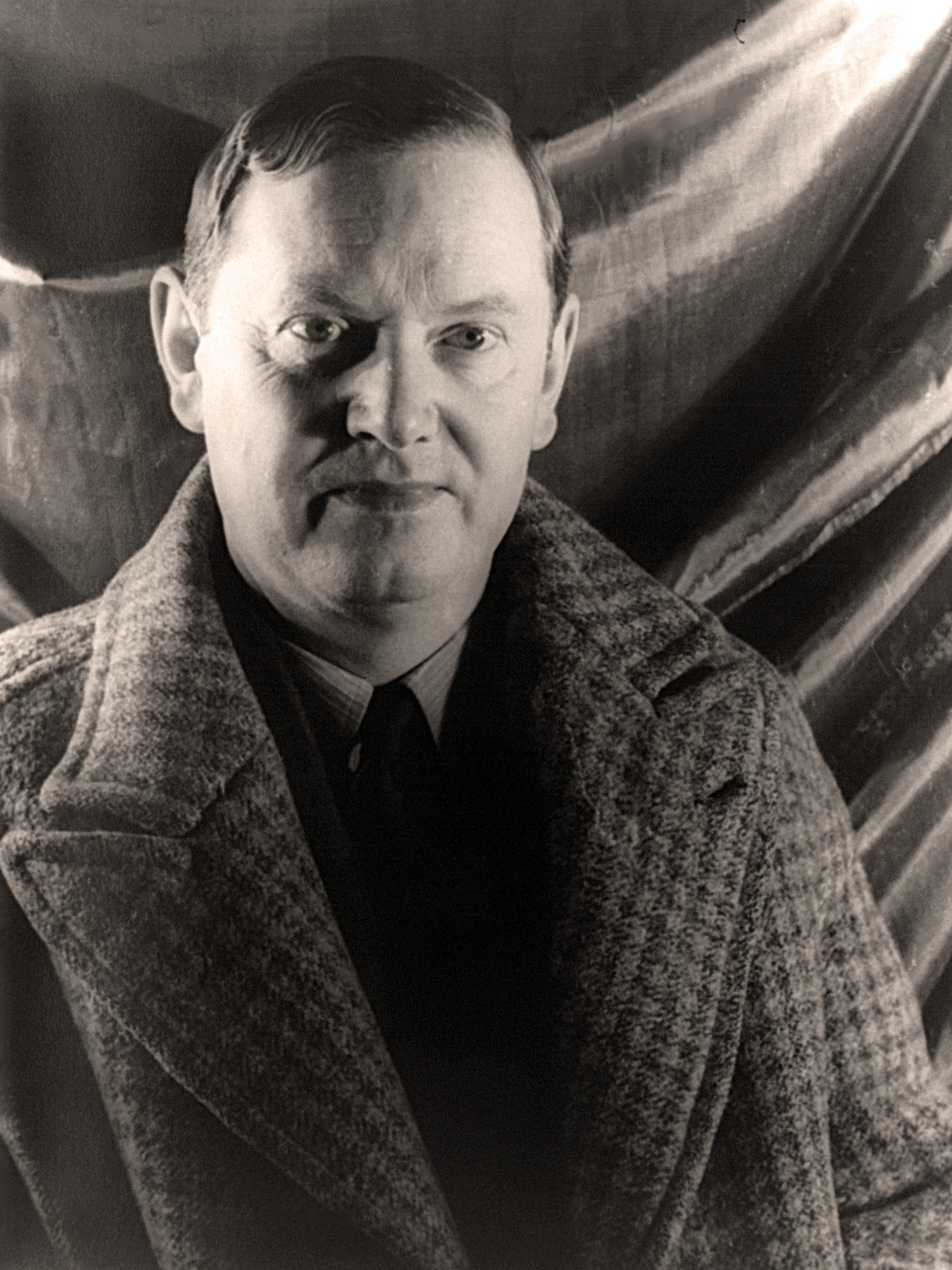
Evelyn Waugh praised The Diary of a Nobody as "the funniest book in the world".

The novelist Evelyn Waugh had been familiar with the Diary since his childhood. It was a great favourite of his parents—Arthur Waugh used to read passages aloud to his family, and Evelyn's biographer Selina Hastings has drawn attention to the distinctly Pooterish elements in the Waugh household. Evelyn Waugh was initially contemptuous of the book, but grew to admire it, to the extent of writing in his 1930 essay "One Way to Immortality" that it was "the funniest book in the world". He added: "Nobody wants to read other people's reflections on life and religion and politics, but the routine of their day, properly recorded, is always interesting, and will become more so as conditions change with the years". Morton posits that several of the leading characters in Waugh's early novels, though socially far removed from the Pooters, share the bafflement of Charles and Carrie with the problems of a changing world. In his 1945 novel Brideshead Revisited, Waugh has Lady Marchmain comforting her family by reading aloud from the Diary "with her beautiful voice and great humour of expression". Morton suggests that one of the work's attractions to Waugh was his personal identification with Lupin, and the way in which the disapproved son (as Waugh saw himself) repeatedly manages to turn adverse circumstances to his ultimate advantage.

At about the time that Waugh was discovering his affection for the Diary another writer, J. B. Priestley, was extolling it as an exemplar of English humour; Jerome K. Jerome, Priestley asserted, never wrote anything as good: "[P]oor Mr Pooter, with his simplicity, his timidity, his goodness of heart, is not simply a figure of fun but one of those innocent, lovable fools who are dear to the heart". In a 1943 essay, George Orwell considered the book an accurate account of English life in the 1880s. In describing Pooter he revived the Don Quixote analogy but saw this English equivalent as a sentimentalised version of the original, one who "constantly suffers disasters brought upon him by his own folly". In the years after the Second World War the book's stock remained high; Osbert Lancaster deemed it "a great work of art", and similar enthusiasm was expressed by a new generation of writers and social historians. Gillian Tindall, writing in 1970, thought the Diary "the best comic novel in the language", and lauded Pooter as "the presiding shade" of his era. This accolade was echoed a further generation on by A. N. Wilson, who wrote in his study of the Victorian era: "Who is to say that Oscar Wilde and Aubrey Beardsley are more typical of the [1890s] than the lower-middle class Charles and Carrie Pooter?" Wilson also observed the extent to which the Pooters had become recognised as "arbiters of the greatest good taste", as the late 20th-century English middle classes sought to acquire or preserve authentic Victorian features in their carefully crafted "period" homes. A Spectator article of 2008 remarks on how such houses as "The Laurels", the humble habitats of 1890s City clerks, had by the 21st century become desirable £1 million-plus homes in what it terms "banker land".

== Literary and cultural influence ==
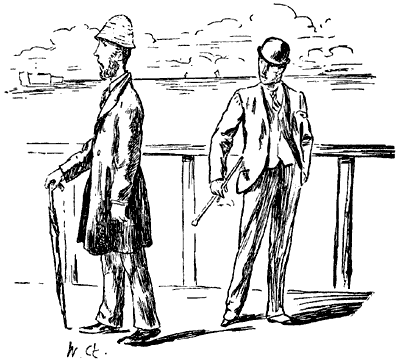
Charles (left) and Lupin Pooter at Broadstairs, from Chapter VI of The Diary of a Nobody

Peter Bailey, in his study "White Collars, Gray Lives" (1999), traces the beginnings of literary interest in the lower-middle classes to the "disquieting irruption of a new breed of petty bourgeois shop and office workers" that faced Victorian writers in the last quarter of the 19th century. The Grossmiths' Diary was a typical satire of its time; it probed the lower-middle class lives of the Pooters and poked fun at their pretensions and petty concerns. Tony Joseph calls the Diary "a sharp analysis of social insecurity". Although many writers had themselves come from humble backgrounds, they often sought to disguise their origins through scorn: "putting the boot in on the lower middle classes", says Bailey, "has long been the intellectual's blood sport". However, the quarter-century following the publication of The Diary of a Nobody saw a tendency to mix mockery with sympathy, even approval. In the works of writers such as George Gissing, H. G. Wells, Arnold Bennett and E. M. Forster, characters emerged who, despite the recognisably Pooterish aspects of their lives, were by no means entirely absurd. Bennett and Wells could poke fun at figures such as "Denry Machin", "Mr Polly" or "Mr Lewisham", while at the same time celebrating their fortitude, energy and determination to look for better things. In cases such as these, writes Bailey, "disdain could change to admiration and national self-identification, as the Little Man ... was transposed into Everyman, a model of cheerful resilience in times of crisis."

During the past century, the fictitious diary has developed as an accepted means of comedic expression; the original has, says Morton, "been fertile ground which has germinated many seeds". An early example is Anita Loos's novel of 1925: Gentlemen Prefer Blondes: The Illuminating Diary of a Professional Lady in which the protagonist, Lorelei Lee, records her flirtatious adventure in prose that "follows the mannerisms of colloquial speech" and suggests innocence or ignorance yet, the critic Elyse Graham observes, "burlesques, in excoriating detail, the vernacular of the American middle class". The diary genre became particularly popular in the late 20th century. In 1978–81 Christopher Matthew produced three volumes of diaries recording the daily life of "Simon Crisp", a bachelor would-be man-about town of the era. The title of the first, The Diary of a Somebody, is a direct reference to the Grossmith original. Reviewing this volume in The Spectator, Benny Green points out several parallels with the original, in both character and event. Matthew's book, says Green, is amusing, but the Grossmiths' book is superior; it is "affecting as well as comical, in a way that the Matthew pastiche is not". In 1982 came the first appearance of Sue Townsend's teenage creation, Adrian Mole, whose passage into young manhood and early middle age is charted in a long series of diaries. The more middle-aged he becomes, says Morton, the more he resembles Pooter.

Keith Waterhouse's Mrs Pooter's Diary of 1983 is an adaptation of the Grossmith original that shifts the narrative voice to Carrie Pooter. In 1996 Helen Fielding used the imaginary diary format for Bridget Jones's Diary, which records the daily paraphernalia of a single woman's life. The New York Times critic wrote that it "captures neatly the way modern women teeter between 'I am woman' independence and a pathetic girlie desire to be all things to all men." This diary began as a weekly column in The Independent. In the 1990s the satirical magazine Private Eye lampooned John Major, British prime minister 1990–1997, in "The Secret Diary of John Major aged 47 3/4", a hybrid of the Adrian Mole diaries with The Diary of a Nobody, which made much fun of Major's lower-middle class origins. (Note: Among earlier Private Eye prime ministerial parodies was "Mrs Wilson's Diary", which ran during the premierships of Harold Wilson (1964–70 and 1974–76). A stage version of this diary, produced in 1967, was censored at the request of Wilson.)

"Cockney anglers, cockney shooters,
Murray Poshes, Lupin Pooters
Long in Kensal Green and Highgate silent under soot and stone,"

— From "Middlesex". John Betjeman, 1954

The social historian James Hammerton defines "Pooterism" as "the dependent weakness and inflated social pretension of white-collar workers, constructed in the workplace but expressed just as powerfully at home". Jon Wilde of The Guardian observes this characteristic in a number of British TV comedy creations of the late 20th and early 21st centuries: Captain Mainwaring, Victor Meldrew, and Peep Show's Mark Corrigan are all examples of characters "whose blinkered view of themselves is forever in sharp contrast to how they are perceived by the world". Charles Pooter, says Hammerton, was a metaphor for lower middle-class pretension, pomposity and self-importance, set up for mockery by the "elites". However, by the mid-20th century changes in the perception of masculine roles in lower middle-class society had stifled the mockery, as men increasingly embraced domesticity. Hammerton remarks that the Grossmiths "would surely appreciate the irony in seeing features of the lower middle-class existence they mocked so mercilessly becoming the more universal model for 20th century family life". Bailey remarks on how the poet John Betjeman presented the Pooters "not as objects of ridicule but of envy, snug and secure in their suburban retreat". (Note: In his elegiac poem "Middlesex" (1954), Betjeman reflects sadly on the lost generation of "Murray Poshes, Lupin Pooters/Long in Kensal Green and Highgate silent under soot and stone", the latter line a reference to two prominent North London cemeteries.) As well as "Middlesex", Betjeman also refers to the book in his poems "Thoughts on The Diary of a Nobody " (1954) and "In Willesden Churchyard" (1966).

== Adaptations ==
In September 1954 a stage version of the Diary, by Basil Dean and Richard Blake, was presented at London's Arts Theatre with a cast that included George Benson and Dulcie Gray as the Pooters and Leslie Phillips as Lupin. Anthony Hartley, writing in The Spectator, classed this production as "fair-to-middling", with sympathetic performances from the principals: "[I]t is a precondition of this kind of play that everybody concerned should have a heart of gold: only in the case of Mr. Pooter's employer, Mr. Perkupp, do we actually hear the metal chinking."

In 1986 Waterhouse presented an adaptation of his "Mrs Pooter" text at the Garrick Theatre, with Judi Dench and Michael Williams. This version was revived in 1993 at the Greenwich Theatre in a production by Matthew Francis. Clive Swift and Patricia Routledge played Charles and Carrie, in what Paul Taylor in The Independent described as "essentially a two-hander ... in which all the other folk (including Lupin Pooter, the uppish, worrying son) are either imagined characters or, at times, impersonated by the Pooters".

In March 2011 the Diary was the subject of an even less orthodox production at the Royal & Derngate Theatre, Northampton. Adapted by Hugh Osborne, with an all-male cast led by Robert Daws, this supposes that Pooter has arranged for his diaries to be performed by amateur actors. Lyn Gardner in The Guardian found it "a show of some charm—though one that, like Pooter himself, does not quite have the credentials to be quite so pleased with itself".

In 2014 a production of the Diary was staged in London by Rough Haired Pointer at the White Bear Theatre and later transferred to the King's Head Theatre. This production was revived at the King's Head in 2017; Time Out said of it: "It captures the original’s sharp subtext, frivolous wit and heavy irony, while also being very, very silly".

The first adaptation for screen was Ken Russell's short (40-minute) film for the BBC film unit in 1964. Russell shot this in the style of the silent films of Buster Keaton and Charlie Chaplin, with the text narrated in a voice-over. The BBC screened two subsequent adaptations: in 1979 a version dramatised by Basil Boothroyd, and in 2007 a four-part dramatisation by Andrew Davies, directed by Susanna White and first shown on BBC Four as part of the channel's Edwardian season. The Guardian's critic wrote of the latter that Hugh Bonneville was "immaculate as the ignored kerfuffler [Pooter]."

BBC Radio 4 has broadcast several dramatisations of the Diary. These include Stephen Tompkinson and Annette Badland in a 2004 adaptation by Kelvin Segger, and Johnny Vegas and Katherine Parkinson in Andrew Lynch's 2012 adaptation. also in 1997 a serialised reading by Arthur Lowe. In May 1990, the BBC World Service broadcast a radio version of the 1986 Keith Waterhouse adaptation, starring Judi Dench and Michael Williams; this production was later re-broadcast on 24 December 1991 on BBC Radio 4.

== Notes and references ==
Notes

Citations

Bibliography

- Bailey, Peter (July 1999). "White Collars, Gray Lives? The Lower Middle Class Revisited". Journal of British Studies. 38 (3): 273–90. doi:10.1086/386195. JSTOR 176057. PMID 21987863. S2CID 44414667. (subscription required)
- Belloc, Hilaire (1910). On Anything. London: Constable & Co. OCLC 847943346.
- Betjeman, John (1962). John Betjeman's Collected Poems. London: John Murray. OCLC 557353495.
- Flanagan, Kevin M., ed. (2009). Ken Russell: Re-Viewing England's Last Mannerist. Lanham, Maryland: Scarecrow Press. ISBN 978-0-8108-6954-7.
- Gilbert, David; Preston, Rebecca (2003). "Stop being so English: Suburban Modernity and National Identity in the Twentieth Century" in Geographies of British Modernity: Space and Society in the Twentieth Century. Oxford: Blackwells. ISBN 0-631-23500-0.
- Grossmith, George; Grossmith, Weedon (1910). The Diary of a Nobody. Bristol: J.W. Arrowsmith. OCLC 12625126. (includes publisher's prefatory note)
- Grossmith, George; Grossmith, Weedon (1969). The Diary of a Nobody. London: The Folio Society. ISBN 978-0-85067-015-8. (includes Introduction by "J.H.")
- Hammerton, A. James (July 1999). "Pooterism or Partnership? Marriage and Masculine Identity in the Lower Middle Class, 1870–1920". Journal of British Studies. 38 (3): 291–321. doi:10.1086/386196. JSTOR 176058. PMID 21977556. (subscription required)
- Hastings, Selina (1994). Evelyn Waugh: A biography. London: Sinclair-Stevenson. ISBN 1-85619-223-7.
- Lewis, D. B. Wyndham (1924). At the Sign of the Blue Moon. London: A. Melrose. OCLC 7518072.
- Miller, John (2002). Judi Dench: With A Crack in Her Voice. London: Orion Books. ISBN 0-7528-4894-1.
- Orwell, George (2002). Carey, John (ed.). Essays. New York: Alfred A. Knopf. ISBN 978-0-375-41503-6.
- Priestley, J. B. (1929). English Humour. London: Longmans, Green. OCLC 459617198.
- Waugh, Evelyn (1983). A Little Learning. Harmondsworth, UK: Penguin Books. ISBN 0-14-006604-7.
- Waugh, Evelyn (1945). Brideshead Revisited. London: Chapman & Hall. OCLC 751303885.
- Waugh, Evelyn, ed. Donat Gallagher (1983). The Essays, Articles and Reviews of Evelyn Waugh. London: Methuen. ISBN 978-0-413-50370-1.
- Wilson, A. N. (1989). Eminent Victorians. London: BBC Books. ISBN 0-563-20719-1.
- Wilson, A. N. (2003). The Victorians. London: Arrow Books. ISBN 978-0-09-945186-0.
