= Pickwick (operetta) =

1889 operetta by Solomon and Burnand

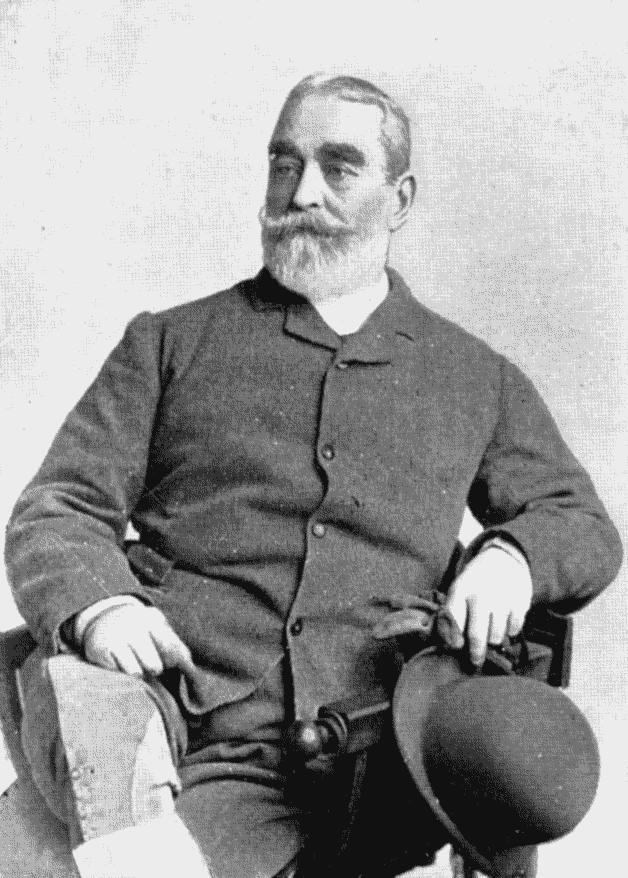
F. C. Burnand, author of Pickwick

Pickwick is an 1889 operetta in one act based on an episode in the 1836 novel The Pickwick Papers by Charles Dickens. The score was by Edward Solomon to lyrics by F. C. Burnand. It was one of three works written by the duo in collaboration, the others being Domestic Economy and The Tiger, both in 1890.

== Production ==
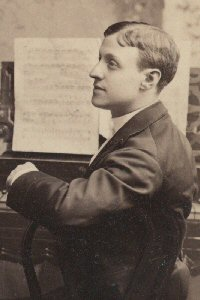
Edward Solomon, composer of Pickwick

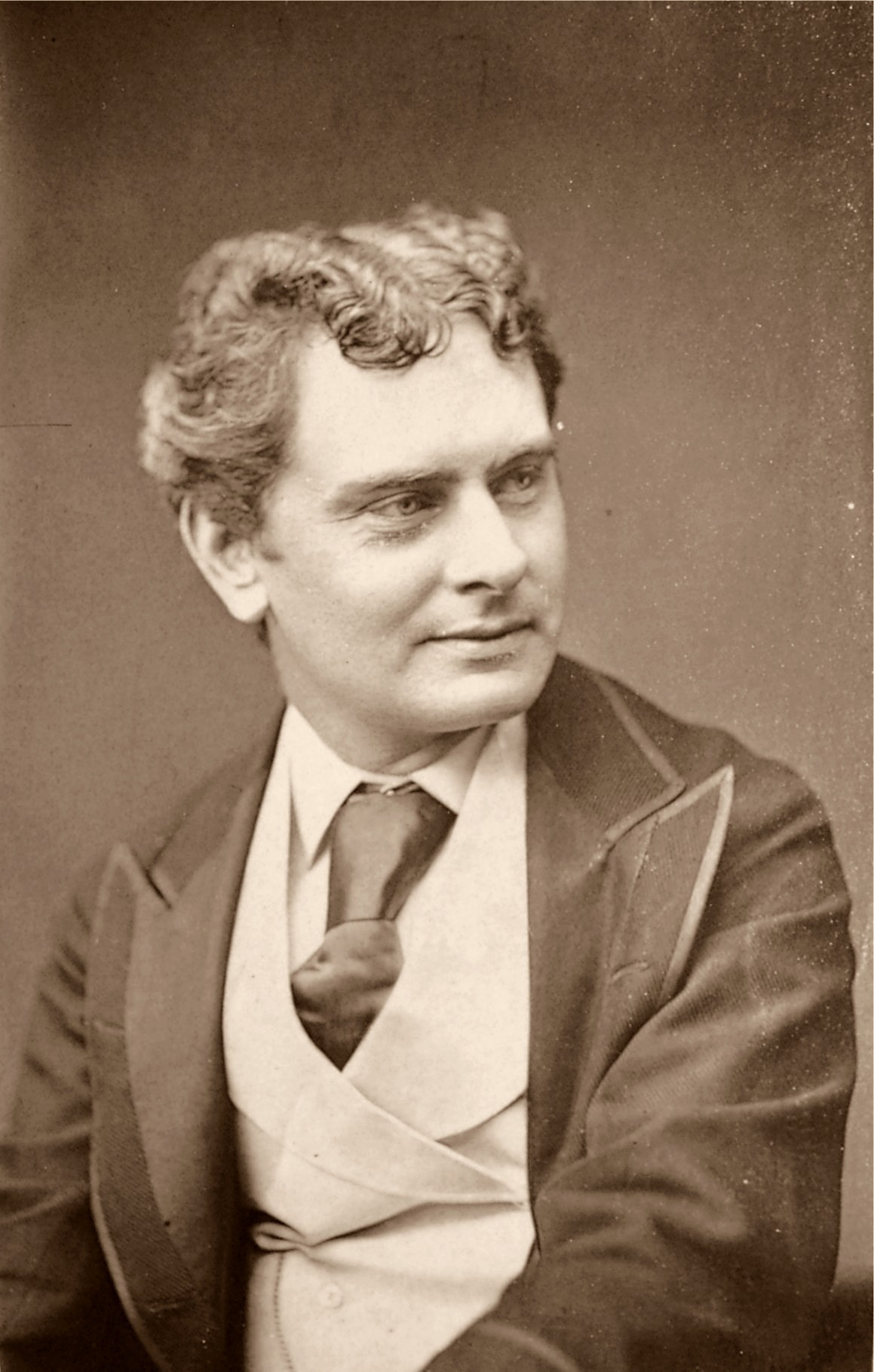
Arthur Cecil played Mr Pickwick

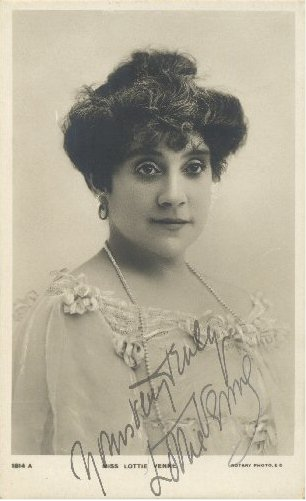
Lottie Venne played Mrs Bardell

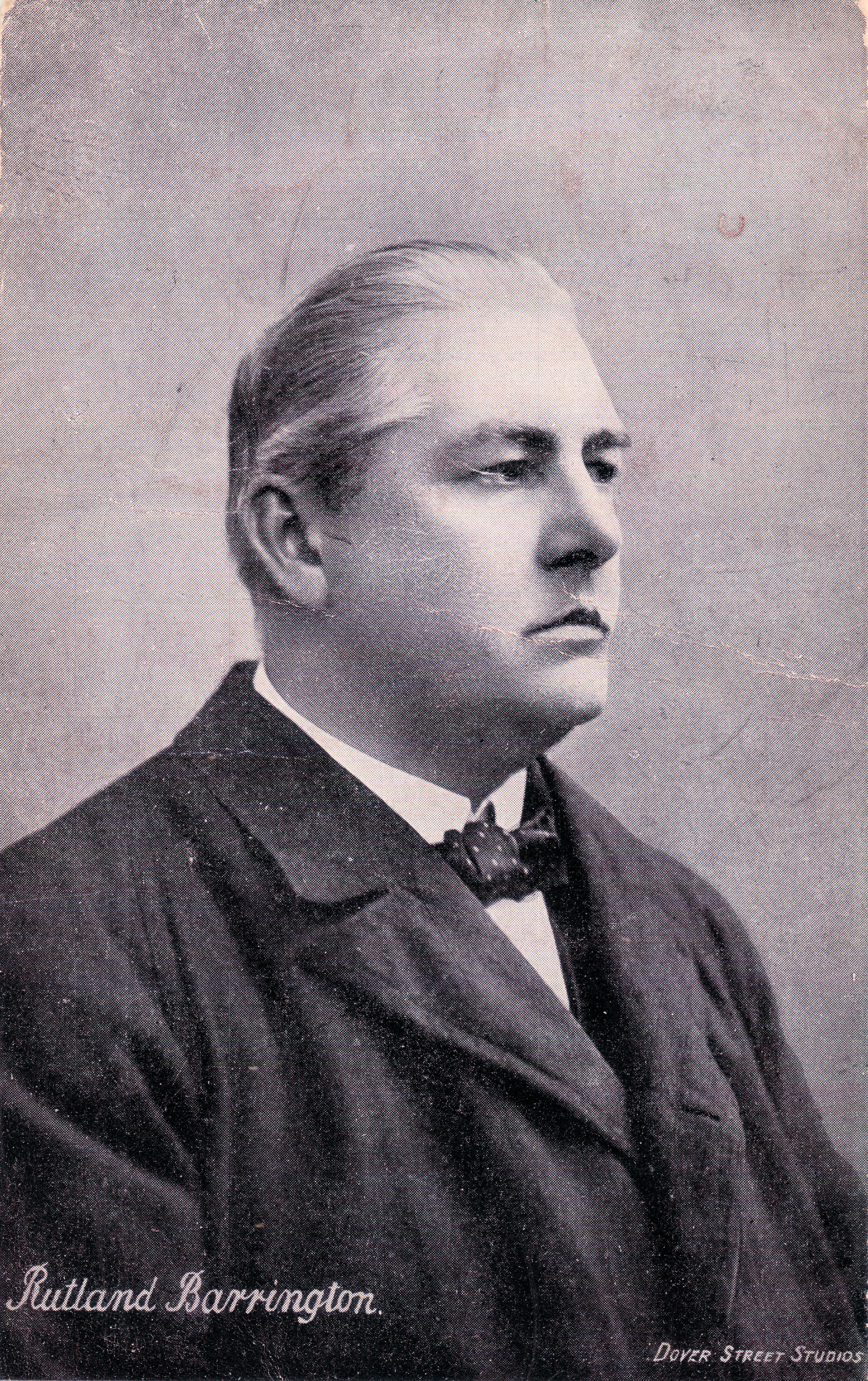
Rutland Barrington played the Baker

Billed as a 'dramatic cantata' in emulation of Gilbert and Sullivan's Trial by Jury (1875), the production opened at the Comedy Theatre in London, then under the management of Charles Hawtrey, at a benefit matinee on 7 February 1889, where it ran for several weeks with some success. As with Trial, there is no spoken dialogue, but in later productions dialogue was added. Based on the comic romantic misunderstanding between Pickwick and Mrs. Bardell in the first half of Chapter 12 of The Pickwick Papers when she mistakes Pickwick's intention of keeping a manservant - “Do you think it’s a much greater expense to keep two people, than to keep one?” - for a proposal of marriage. Burnand also incorporated some material from the breach of promise trial scene in Chapter 34 in which it is revealed that Mrs. Bardell had been keeping company with the baker. Burnand's development is to turn the minor character of the Baker into a major one, becoming in Burnand's version a serious suitor to Mrs. Bardell. She is tempted to accept his offer of marriage, he turning up with a blank marriage certificate and giving her half an hour to make up her mind, while she prevaricates, thinking she could make a better match by marrying Mr Pickwick.

The piece was written as a vehicle for Arthur Cecil, while Savoy Opera performer Rutland Barrington ended up directing and also alternating in the roles of Pickwick and Baker.

In his memoir Rutland Barrington by Himself he wrote of the production:

My next appearance was at the Comedy Theatre, under the management of Charles Hawtrey, in a three-act farce by Sydney Grundy called Merry Margate, which was merry enough while it lasted, which was not long, and we followed this with a one-act piece by Burnand, founded on an episode in Pickwick, to which Edward Solomon had written some delightful music. Lottie Venne, Arthur Cecil, and myself represented Mrs. Bardell, Pickwick, and the Baker respectively. I am inclined to believe the Baker to be an invention of Burnand's, as I do not remember any mention of him in Pickwick; but it was a good part, and the little piece used to go splendidly; indeed, I fancy it would reproduce well, as would also another one-act piece I played in by George Hawtrey, namely, The Area Belle, in which I played Tosser to the Pitcher of Dan Leno, for one occasion only.

I well remember Arthur Cecil's surprise and envy when we assembled at his chambers in the Haymarket for the first music rehearsal of Pickwick, and I read all mine off as if I knew it. He said it took him a week to learn one song.

He was notorious for his attention to detail in the parts he played, and we had an amusing instance of it in this piece, he suggesting some business with butcher's account-book which Pickwick was to add up, but as it would have required at least four lines of dialogue to explain, it was cut.

He and Burnand eventually got so befogged over the stage management of the piece that they finally, on the suggestion of Solomon, handed over to me the task of production, and Arthur was so overjoyed at his respite that he presented me with a very quaint old Queen Anne punch-ladle, which I much prize. Another amusing incident in connection with Pickwick was that, owing to some accident, the production was postponed at the very last moment, in spite of which a certain journal contained the next morning a violent diatribe against the piece and all concerned in it. It was possibly the only occasion on which I have been told I acted badly without deserving it, and then it may be only because I had not acted at all. Burnand, of course, brought an action, and was awarded damages. I was a witness, both disinterested and unpaid; I think the first and last time I have been any of the three.

On one occasion we played Pickwick at the Crystal Palace at 7.30, having to get back to the Comedy in time to play it at 10.30. This was too much for Arthur Cecil, who went off to Brighton from the Palace, and I played Pickwick at the Comedy, Charlie Hawtrey himself playing the Baker; but to my great chagrin he refused to take advantage of such a capital chance of giving his well-known imitation of me, and sang his music much less effectively in consequence.

Barrington later wrote that Solomon’s score was “brimming over with melodies that caught the ear at once”. Of Lottie Venne's performance in the original production Barrington later recalled, "This great little artist possesses, in addition to her many charms, a wonderful manner of speaking that kind of doubtful line which is sometimes alluded to by journalists as 'skating on thin ice'; and this power was occasionally abused by authors, much to her distress. She once came to me at rehearsal and pointing out a speech said, 'B. dear, I can't say that, now, can I?' My obvious reply was, 'Well, Lottie, if you can't, no one can.'"

Pickwick proved a success and it soon moved from matinees to evening performances with the original cast also playing it one evening at The Crystal Palace and at the Royal Court Theatre in 1891. The music publisher Boosey & Co. brought out the score in their series of “Operettas for the Drawing-Room” in about 1895.

The work was revived in 1893 as a forepiece to Tom, Dick & Harry at the Trafalgar Square Theatre where it ran for about 25 performances from 13 December 1893 to 6 January 1894 with Jessie Bond as Mrs Bardell.

== Synopsis ==
After the Overture, Mrs Bardell is discovered dusting, during which she sings her first solo. Her son Tommy appears to tell her that Mr Pickwick has paid him to take a message to The Borough, while Mrs Bardell states, "Sometimes I fancy he regards me with a – well if he were a youngerman I should call it “a wicked eye,” but as it’s Mr. Pickwick, I can only call it a Pick-wicked eye." She then muses on which she should choose- Pickwick or the Baker. Her second solo, “My Next”, concerns who should be her next husband. The Baker enters and makes his ultimatum - the wedding certificate is blank - she must choose him in half an hour or he will enter another's name on the form. The Baker leaves, accidentally leaving his basket behind, giving Mrs. Bardell an excuse to leave the stage following him with the basket.

As Mrs Bardell leaves Mr Pickwick enters, not realising he is the object of Mrs Bardell's affections - and he sings two solos. As Pickwick breakfasts Mrs Bardell reprises her song "My Next" while Pickwick eats. After he sings his third solo, "The Bachelor". In an extended musical sequence Pickwick asks the question that leads to the misunderstanding - and which inadvertently takes him into a love triangle - “Do you think it is a much greater expense to keep two than one?” Mrs Bardell, believing Pickwick has proposed to her faints into his arms just as the Baker enters, looking for his forgotten basket. On Pickwick's attempt to explain the misunderstanding Mrs Bardell menacingly threatens him with the lines, "You’ll hear from me another day. Then something more to you I’ll say".

== Original cast ==
- Samuel Pickwick - Arthur Cecil
- Mrs Bardell - Lottie Venne
- The Baker - Rutland Barrington and later played by Charles Hawtrey (one performance)
- Tommy - Arthur Knight

== Retrospect Opera ==
CD cover of Retrospect Opera's 2016 release of Pickwick

In 2016 Retrospect Opera released a recording of the work with Simon Butteriss as Pickwick, Gaynor Keeble as Mrs Bardell, and Toby Stafford-Allen as the Baker. The CD was released with a recording of George Grossmith's Cups and Saucers (1876) which was a curtain-raiser for the original production of Pickwick.
