= Weedon Grossmith =

English writer and actor (1854–1919)

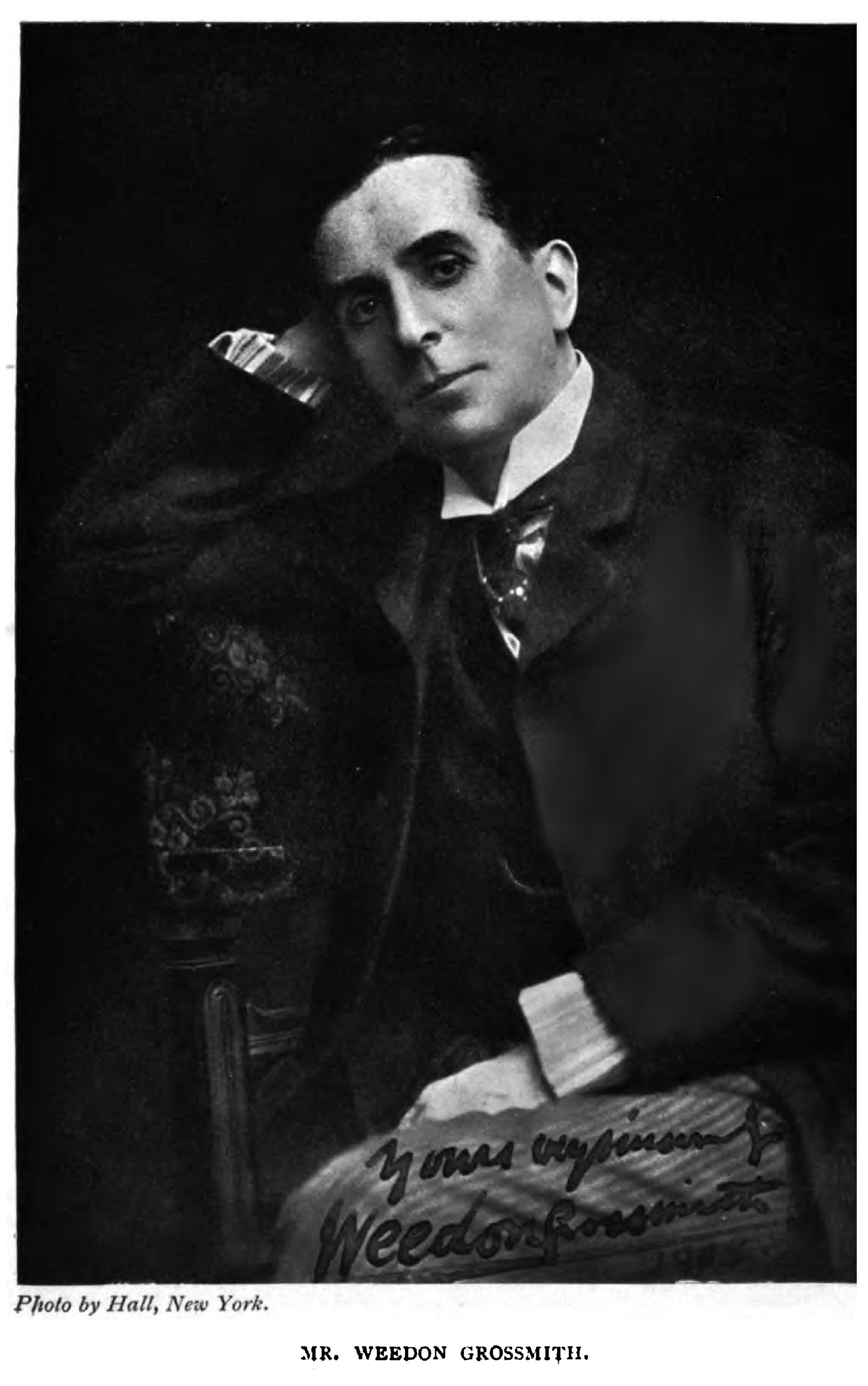
Weedon Grossmith, c. 1904

Walter Weedon Grossmith (9 June 1854 – 14 June 1919) was an English writer, actor, painter and playwright best known as co-author of The Diary of a Nobody (1892) with his brother, music hall comedian and Gilbert and Sullivan star George Grossmith. Weedon Grossmith also illustrated The Diary of a Nobody to much acclaim.

Grossmith trained as a painter, but was unable to make a living in that capacity and went on the stage largely for financial reasons. He was successful as an actor and as an impresario, and wrote several plays. As an actor, he specialised in comedy roles, and his typical characters, harassed and scheming, became so identified with him that the "Weedon Grossmith part" became a regular feature of the theatre of his day.

== Life and career ==
=== Early years ===
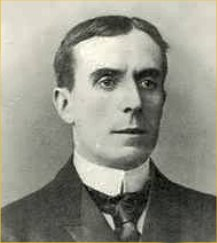
Grossmith in 1894

Grossmith was born in London and grew up in St. Pancras and Hampstead, London. His father, George Grossmith (1820–80), was the chief court reporter for The Times and other newspapers at the Bow Street police court and a lecturer and entertainer. His mother was Louisa Emmeline Grossmith née Weedon (d. 1882). His brother, George, became famous as the principal comedian of the Gilbert and Sullivan operas with the D'Oyly Carte Opera Company and was the most famous comedy-sketch pianist of the Victorian era.

Grossmith was educated at Massingham House on Haverstock Hill in Hampstead, and then at the North London Collegiate in Camden Town and Simpson's School, a local private establishment. Interested in art, he trained as a painter at the West London School of Art, the Slade and the Royal Academy. His goal was to become a fashionable portrait painter. He had portraits and other pictures hung at the Academy (beginning with a full-length portrait of his father) and at the Grosvenor Gallery and elsewhere. However, his career as an artist was not as successful as he had hoped. Richard D'Oyly Carte, having seen him act in amateur performances, encouraged him to take to the stage professionally. Having, as he later recalled, liabilities of £700 and cash assets of £6, he consulted his fellow-artists Frank Holl and Luke Fildes about abandoning art in favour of the theatre:

He [Fildes] thought it madness when I had conquered all the great difficulties of painting. I quite agreed with him, but when I told him of my dreadful run of bad luck, and the little I had, he said he was bound to admit that if I had another string to play on, it was worth considering. But he still thought it an awful pity, and so have I thought ever since.

=== Acting career ===
Grossmith (l) in Mr. Preedy and the Countess, 1905

Grossmith turned to acting in 1885, which he pursued until 1917. Joining Rosina Vokes's theatrical company in 1885, he went on tour in the provinces and in America. He first appeared in London at the Gaiety Theatre in 1887 as Woodcock in Woodcock's Little Game. Neither he nor the play was a success. Grossmith contemplated giving up the stage and returning to painting. He was shunned by managers who had promised him work, but on the strength of his American successes he was engaged by Henry Irving in 1888 to play Jacques Strop at the Lyceum Theatre in Charles Selby's Robert Macaire. He was nearly dismissed for interpreting Irving's direction, "You must imitate me", as an instruction to give an impersonation of the star's well-known mannerisms. His earliest notable success was made in A Pantomime Rehearsal, a short play (parodying incompetent amateur theatricals) with which he was associated for many years. In 1888 Grossmith joined the company of Richard Mansfield in Wealth, playing the role of Percy Palfreyman. In the following year he began a long association with the Court Theatre; he appeared there in Aunt Jack, The Cabinet Minister and The Volcano. He also played in The School for Scandal at the Globe Theatre (1889) and portrayed Joseph Lebanon in Arthur Wing Pinero's Cabinet Minister (1890).

In 1891, in partnership with Brandon Thomas, Grossmith presented and appeared in a triple bill, which included A Pantomime Rehearsal. After a shaky start, the production became a huge success; Grossmith appeared in it for more than 700 performances, in four different West End theatres, and he later calculated that Sebastian Smith as the leading man must have played the part about 1,000 times in London and on tour.

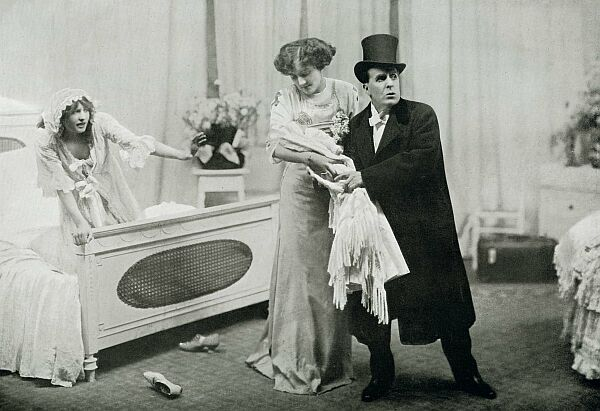
Iris Hoey, Lilias Waldegrave and Grossmith in Baby Mine (1911)

Grossmith went on to appear in plays by playwrights such as Henry Arthur Jones and Jerome K. Jerome, opposite actors such as Herbert Beerbohm Tree at the Haymarket Theatre and with Mrs. John Wood at the Court Theatre. In 1892, he played in W. S. Gilbert's Rosencrantz and Guildenstern, a parody of Hamlet, at the Royal Court Theatre. He became known for playing comedy character roles, noting, "I am almost invariably cast for cowards, cads and snobs", and he was particularly good at portraying harassed, misunderstood little men as, like his brother George, he was small in stature. The Times wrote that the "Weedon Grossmith" part had become a recognised feature of current drama.

He portrayed Archibald Rennick in Arthur Law's The New Boy (1894), Hamilton Preedy in Mr. Preedy and the Countess (1905), Jimmy Jinks in Baby Mine (1911), the Earl of Tweenwayes in The Amazons, Boney in The Misleading Lady, and the Judge in Stopping the Breach, his last new role (1917). The critic B. W. Findon wrote, "Among the survivors of the old brigade – of the artists who thoroughly understand the requirements of farcical comedy, who know how to treat its humour with breadth, and grapple successfully with its ludicrous situations – is Mr. Weedon Grossmith. He is one of the best – I think I may say the best actor of farce on the stage of to-day."

Grossmith's last stage appearance was in 1918, in his old role of Lord Arthur Pomeroy in A Pantomime Rehearsal, with an all-star cast including Charles Hawtrey, Fay Compton, Irene Castle and Rutland Barrington, at a charity matinée attended by King George V, Queen Mary and Queen Alexandra.

Grossmith was also the lessee of London's Vaudeville Theatre from 1894 to 1896 and Terry's Theatre until 1917.

=== Author and playwright ===
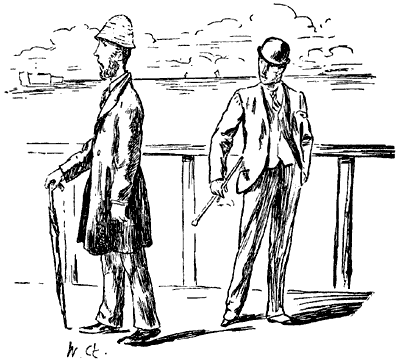
Grossmith's illustration of Charles (left) and Lupin Pooter (Chap. VI of The Diary of a Nobody)

In 1892, Grossmith collaborated with his brother George to expand a series of amusing columns they had written in 1888–89 for Punch. The Diary of a Nobody was published as a novel and has never been out of print since. The book is a sharp analysis of social insecurity, and Charles Pooter of The Laurels, Brickfield Terrace, Holloway, was immediately recognized as one of the great English comic characters. Grossmith created 33 black and white line drawings for the novel. According to biographer Tony Joseph, "In their precise and careful detail these illustrations ... reinforce the text to perfection." The work has itself been the object of dramatization and adaptation, including three times for television: 1964, 1979 and 2007.

Grossmith published another novel, A Woman with a History, in 1896. He also wrote a number of plays, the most successful of which was The Night of the Party (1901), for which he also directed, acted the lead role, designed the scenery and painted the advertising poster. One of his plays, The Duffer, was about students at the Royal Academy, which was successful and enjoyed a Royal Command Performance. In 1913 he published his autobiography, From Studio to Stage.

=== Personal life ===
Grossmith was a member of the Beefsteak, Garrick and Savage clubs. In 1895, he married the actress May Lever Palfrey (1867–1929). They had one child, a daughter, Nancy (1896–1921). He died in London at the age of 65. A memorial service, attended by leading members of the theatrical profession, was held in St Martin-in-the-Fields.

== Notes ==
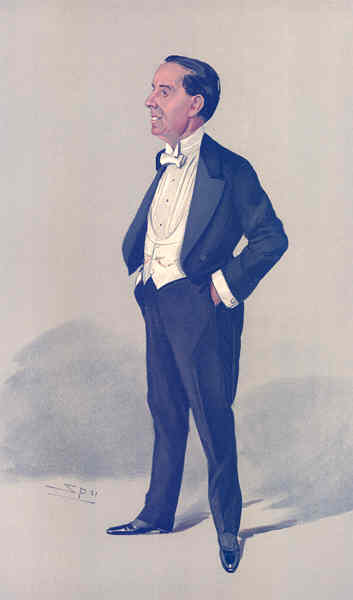
Grossmith in Vanity Fair: The Duffer, by Spy (1905)
