= Arthur Law (playwright) =

English playwright, actor, and scenic designer

- Born: 22 March 1844; Northrepps, Norfolk, England
- Died: 2 April 1913 (aged 69); Parkstone, Poole, Dorset
- Occupations: Playwright, actor, scenic designer
- Spouse: Fanny Holland
- Writing career
- Period: 1872–1909
- Genre: Comic theatre

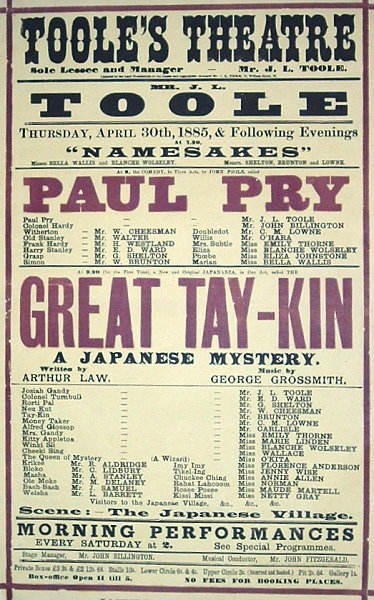
Poster for The Great Tay-Kin by Law and Grossmith

William Arthur Law (22 March 1844 – 2 April 1913), better known as Arthur Law, was an English playwright, actor and scenic designer.

== Life and career ==
Law was born in Northrepps, Norfolk, England, to Rev. Patrick Comerford Law and his wife, Frances nee Arbuthnot. He was educated at the Royal Military College, Sandhurst. From 1864 to 1872, he served in the Royal Scots Fusiliers.

=== Early career ===
Law began to act, making his professional stage debut in 1872 at the Theatre Royal, Edinburgh. He then toured the British provinces and played at London's Surrey Theatre for two years, after which joined the German Reed Entertainments in London in 1874. While performing with the German Reeds, he wrote nineteen short comic theatre works performed by the company. In 1877, Law married actress Fanny Holland, with whom he appeared with the German Reeds at the Gallery of Illustration and St. George's Hall. The couple had a son named Hamilton Patrick John Holland Law (born 1879).

Some of Law's plays for the German Reeds include A Night Surprise in 1877 (under the pseudonym, "West Cromer"), A Happy Bungalow (1877), with music by Charles King Hall; Cherry Tree Farm (1881) and Nobody’s Fault (1882), both with music by Hamilton Clarke. In 1881, he wrote Uncle Samuel, a curtain raiser for the D'Oyly Carte Opera Company played at the Opera Comique, with music by George Grossmith. It played, together with Patience, in 1881, and Law appeared in the role of John Bird. Law later appeared on stage at the Savoy Theatre as Mr. Wranglebury in the companion piece Mock Turtles in 1882, and as Major Murgatroyd in Patience in 1882, filling in for Frank Thornton.

During a two-year period, from 1879 to 1881, Law and Holland performed on tour as "Mr. & Mrs. Arthur Law's Entertainment," but the venture proved unsuccessful. He retired from acting following a final engagement at Savoy Theatre, in 1881, to turn his attention completely to writing.

=== Later years ===
His first "serious" drama, Hope, was produced at London's Standard Theatre in 1882. That year he also wrote a musical farce, Mr. Guffin's Elopement, in collaboration with George Grossmith, for Toole's Theatre, starring J. L. Toole. In 1885, Grossmith and Law wrote The Great Tay-Kin, produced at Toole's.

Law wrote dozens of other plays. His best known include an adaptation of The Mystery of a Hansom Cab, produced at the Princess's Theatre in 1888; The Judge, produced at Terry's Theatre in 1890; The Magic Opal (an operetta with music by Isaac Albéniz) played at the Lyric Theatre and the Prince of Wales's Theatre in 1893; The New Boy at Terry's and the Vaudeville Theatre in 1894; The Sea Flower at the Comedy Theatre in 1898, A Country Mouse at the Prince of Wales's in 1902; The Bride and Bridegroom at the New Theatre in 1904; and Artful Miss Dearing at Terry's in 1909.

A few of Law's plays were also produced on Broadway, including The New Boy in 1894 at the Standard Theatre and A Country Mouse in 1902 at New York's Savoy Theatre. He also created the scenic design for The Bachelor, by Clyde Fitch, in 1909 at the Maxine Elliott Theatre.

Law died in Parkstone, a suburb of Poole, Dorset, England at the age of 69. His brother was the cricketer Alexander Law.
