= James Arrowsmith =

British printer and publisher (1839–1913)

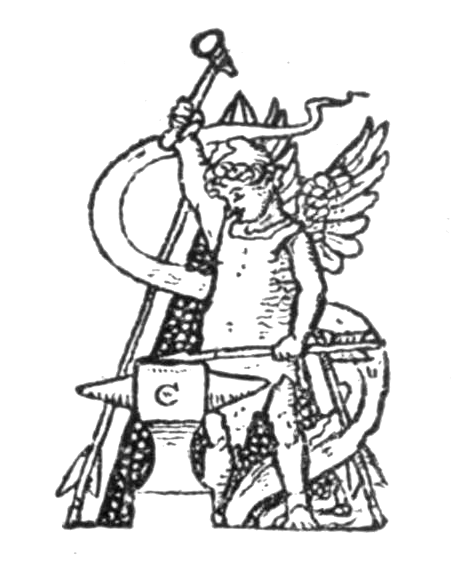
Logo of Arrowsmith as used in 1891

James Williams Arrowsmith (6 November 1839 in Worcester – 19 January 1913 in Bristol) was a printer and publisher in Bristol, of the firm Arrowsmith, which he incorporated as a private company, J. W. Arrowsmith Ltd, in 1911.

James was the third son of Isaac Arrowsmith and Louisa Williams. Isaac started the printing business in 1854. When he died in 1871, James took over the running of the company. He was a supporter of Gloucestershire County Cricket Club and was a personal friend of W. G. Grace. However their friendship was tested owing to disagreements as regards how Cricket (1891) a book by W. G. Grace should be produced.

He played a key role in the erection of a statue to Edward Colston in Bristol in 1895. The statue was proposed by Arrowsmith, the president of the Anchor Society. Several appeals to the public and to Colston-related charitable bodies failed to raise the £1,000 needed for its casting and erection, and Arrowsmith ended up paying the shortfall himself.

He was a prime mover in the foundation of Bristol University.

He founded the Bristol Arrow Bowling Club in 1894 and was president until his death in 1913.
