= Hugh Conway (novelist) =

English novelist (1847–1885)

British author Hugh Conway portrayed shortly before his death by Photographer van der Weyde in London. His best-known books at the time included Dark Days, Called Back and A Family Affair.

Hugh Conway, the pen name of Frederick John Fargus (26 December 1847 – 15 May 1885), was an English novelist born in Bristol, the son of an auctioneer. He had success with his fiction in the early 1880s.

Fargus was intended for his father's business, but at the age of 13 joined a Mersey school ship Conway lent by the Admiralty for training merchant navy officers. He then returned to Bristol, where he was articled to a firm of accountants, until his father's death in 1868, when he took over the family auctioneering business. On 26 August 1871, he married Amy Spark, daughter of a Bristol alderman. They had three sons and a daughter. One son, Archibald, became a first-class cricketer, scholar and clergyman.

== Works ==
While a clerk, Fargus had written words for various songs, adopting the pen name Hugh Conway in memory of his training-ship days. James Williams Arrowsmith, a Bristol printer and publisher, took an interest, and Fargus's first short story appeared in Arrowsmith's Miscellany. In 1883 Fargus published through Arrowsmith his first novella, Called Back, an early thriller that sold over 350,000 copies in four years. One admirer of the book was the American poet Emily Dickinson. A stage version of it appeared in London in 1884, when Fargus published another story, Dark Days. British composer Jane Roeckel (publishing as Jules de Sivrai) used Fagus’ text for her song “Remember Me.”

Ordered to the Riviera for his health, Fargus caught typhoid fever, died in Monte Carlo and was buried in Nice. Several other books of his appeared posthumously, notably A Family Affair, which was serialized in the English Illustrated Magazine in 1884–1885 and first published in volume form in 1885.

Long after his death, one of his novels was filmed as The Last Rose of Summer (1920).

== Novels ==
- Called Back, with Portrait and Sketch of the Life of the Author. Bristol: Arrowsmith, 1885 Bodleian Library
- Dark Days, Bristol: Arrowsmith, 1884 California, Bodleian Library
- A Family Affair, 3 vols, London: Macmillan 1885, Bodleian Library
- Living or Dead, New York: Henry Holt & Co 1886, Harvard
- A Cardinal Sin, London: Remington, 5th ed., 1888, Bodleian Library

== Short stories ==
- Bound Together. Tales, 2 vols, London: Remington & Co, 1884
  - Vol 1: Illinois
  - "The Secret of the Stradivarius" (1881), first published December 1881, "Blackwood's Edinburgh Magazine", Vol. 130, pp. 771–784
  - "Fleurette" (1883), first published April 1883, "Blackwood's Edinburgh Magazine", Vol. 133, pp. 512–523
  - "A Cabinet Secret" (1882), first published 9 December 1882, "All the Year Round", Vol. 50, pp. 469–475
  - "The Bandsman's Story" (1882), first published April 1882, "Blackwood's Edinburgh Magazine", Vol. 131, pp. 491–504
  - "The Blatchford Bequest" (1883), first published 3, 10, 17 and 24 November 1883, "Chambers's Journal", Vol. 60, pp. 699 ff., 713 ff., 729 ff. and 744 ff.
  - "My First Client" (1883), first published December 1883, Bristol Times and Mirror
  - Vol 2: Illinois
  - "Our Last Walk"
  - "Miss Rivers's Revenge" (1883), first published 1, 8 and 15 December 1883 Chambers's Journal Vol. 60, pp. 762 ff., 778 ff. and 793 ff.
  - "The Daughter of the Stars: a psychological romance" (1881), first published 1881, Thirteen at Table, Arrowsmith's Christmas Annual 1881
  - "In One Short Year!"
  - "The Truth of It"
  - A Speculative Spirit (1882), first published 3 June 1882, All the Year Round, Vol. 49, pp. 373–377
- Carriston's Gift and Other Tales (New York: H. Holt & co. 1885), with portrait and illustrations Harvard = Internet Archive
  - "Carriston's Gift" (1885), first published 1885, The Graphic, Summer Number, pp. 4–28
  - "Chewton-Abbot" (1884), first published 3, 10 and 17 May 1884, Chambers's Journal Vol. 61, pp. 280 ff., 295 ff. and 315 ff.
  - "Paul Vargas" (1884), first published April 1884, The English Illustrated Magazine Vol. 1, pp. 439–449
  - "A Dead Man's Face" (1884), first published December 1884, Harper's New Monthly Magazine Vol. 70, pp. 143–152
  - "Julian Vanneck" (1884), first published 1884, Society, Winter Number
  - "The 'Bichwa'" (1884), first published 1884, Bristol Times and Mirror, Christmas Number
- At What Cost, and Other Stories (London: John and Robert Maxwell [1885]) California
  - "At What Cost" (1885, as "At What a Cost"), first published 22 August 1885, Sheffield & Rotherham Independent; 18 September 1885, The Nottinghamshire Guardian
  - "The Story of a Sculptor" (1885), first published 29 August, 5 and 12 September 1885, Sheffield & Rotherham Independent; 28 August, 4 and 11 September 1885, The Nottinghamshire Guardian
  - "Capital Wine" (1885), first published 19 September 1885 Sheffield & Rotherham Independent; 25 September 1885 The Nottinghamshire Guardian
- Carriston's Gift... [1886]
  - "Carriston's Gift" (1885), first published 1885, The Graphic Summer Number, pp. 4–28
  - "A Fresh Start" (1886, @ Trove), first published 12 and 19 June 1886 @ Trove
  - "Julian Vanneck" (1884), first published 1884, Society Winter Number
  - "A Dead Man's Face" (1884), first published December 1884, Harper's New Monthly Magazine Vol. 70, pp. 143–152
