= Called Back (novel) =

1883 novel by Hugh Conway

- Author: Frederick John Fargus
- Language: English
- Publisher: J. W. Arrowsmith
- Publication date: 1883

Called Back is an 1883 mystery/romance novel written by Englishman Frederick John Fargus under the pseudonym Hugh Conway and published in Bristol by J. W. Arrowsmith.

Over 350,000 copies were sold within four years, and Fargus produced a stage version in London in 1884. The book was popular during the 1880s in Amherst, Massachusetts, a fact that has been correlated with the use of the phrase "called back" by American poet Emily Dickinson in her later life. The book, which a friend sent to her, impressed her. She used the title in a later letter. In what was evidently the last letter she composed shortly before she died in May 1886, she simply wrote, "Little Cousins, Called back. Emily."

Conway collaborated with J. Comyns Carr in adapting the novel into a stage play. The play premiered on May 20, 1884 at the Prince's Theatre, London.
