= George Grossmith =

English actor, singer and writer (1847–1912)

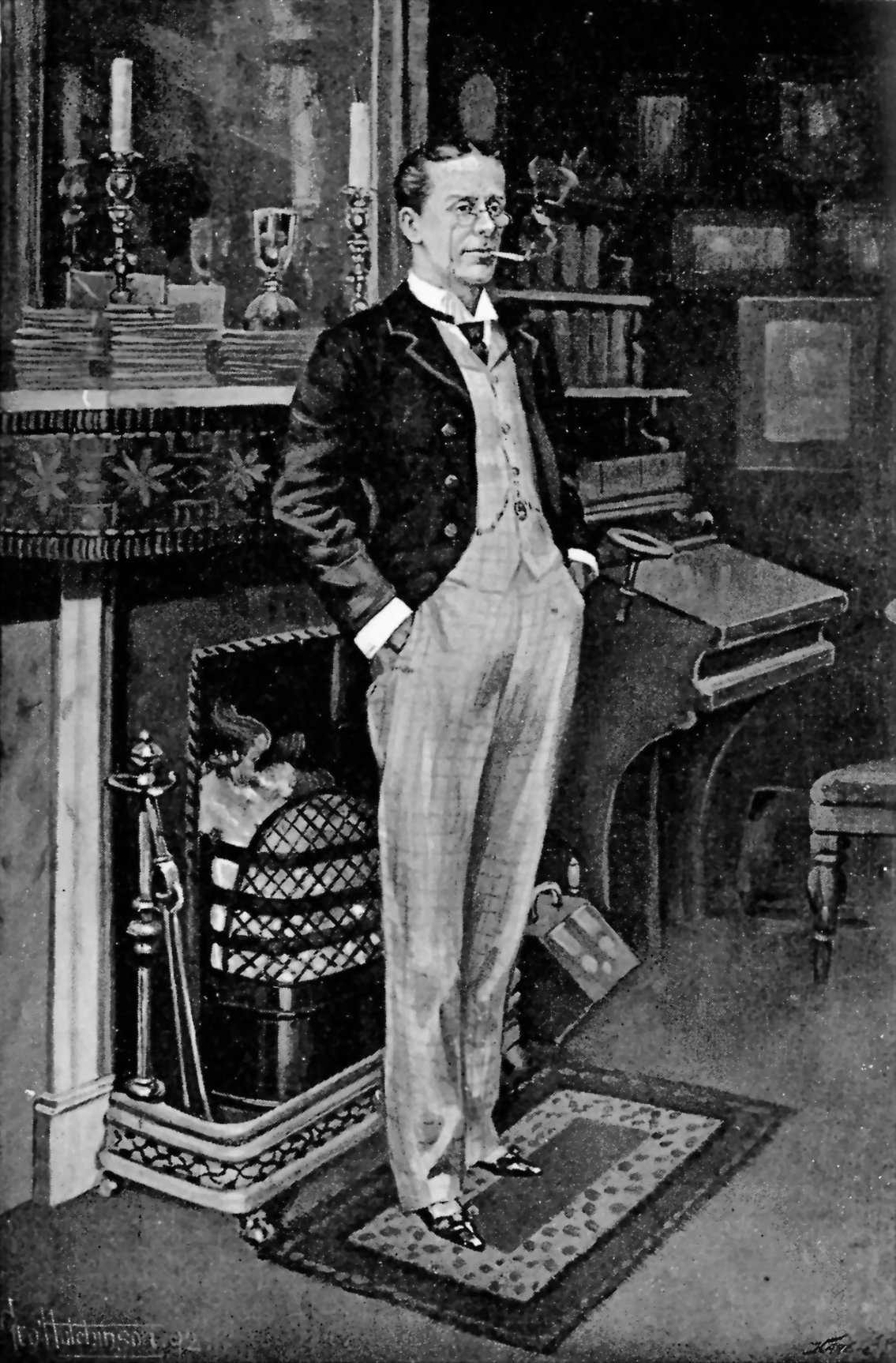
Grossmith, as illustrated in The Idler magazine, 1893

George Grossmith (9 December 1847 – 1 March 1912) was an English comedian, writer, composer, actor, and singer. His performing career spanned more than four decades. As a writer and composer, he created 18 comic operas, nearly 100 musical sketches, some 600 songs and piano pieces, three books and both serious and comic pieces for newspapers and magazines.

Grossmith created a series of nine characters in the comic operas of Gilbert and Sullivan from 1877 to 1889, including Sir Joseph Porter, in H.M.S. Pinafore (1878), the Major-General in The Pirates of Penzance (1880) and Ko-Ko in The Mikado (1885–1887). He also wrote, in collaboration with his brother Weedon, the 1892 comic novel The Diary of a Nobody.

Grossmith was also famous in his day for performing his own comic piano sketches and songs, both before and after his Gilbert and Sullivan days, becoming the most popular British solo performer of the 1890s. Some of his comic songs endure today, including "See Me Dance the Polka". He continued to perform into the first decade of the 20th century. His son, George Grossmith Jr., became an actor, playwright and producer of Edwardian musical comedies; another son, Lawrence, was an actor.

== Life and career ==
=== Early life ===
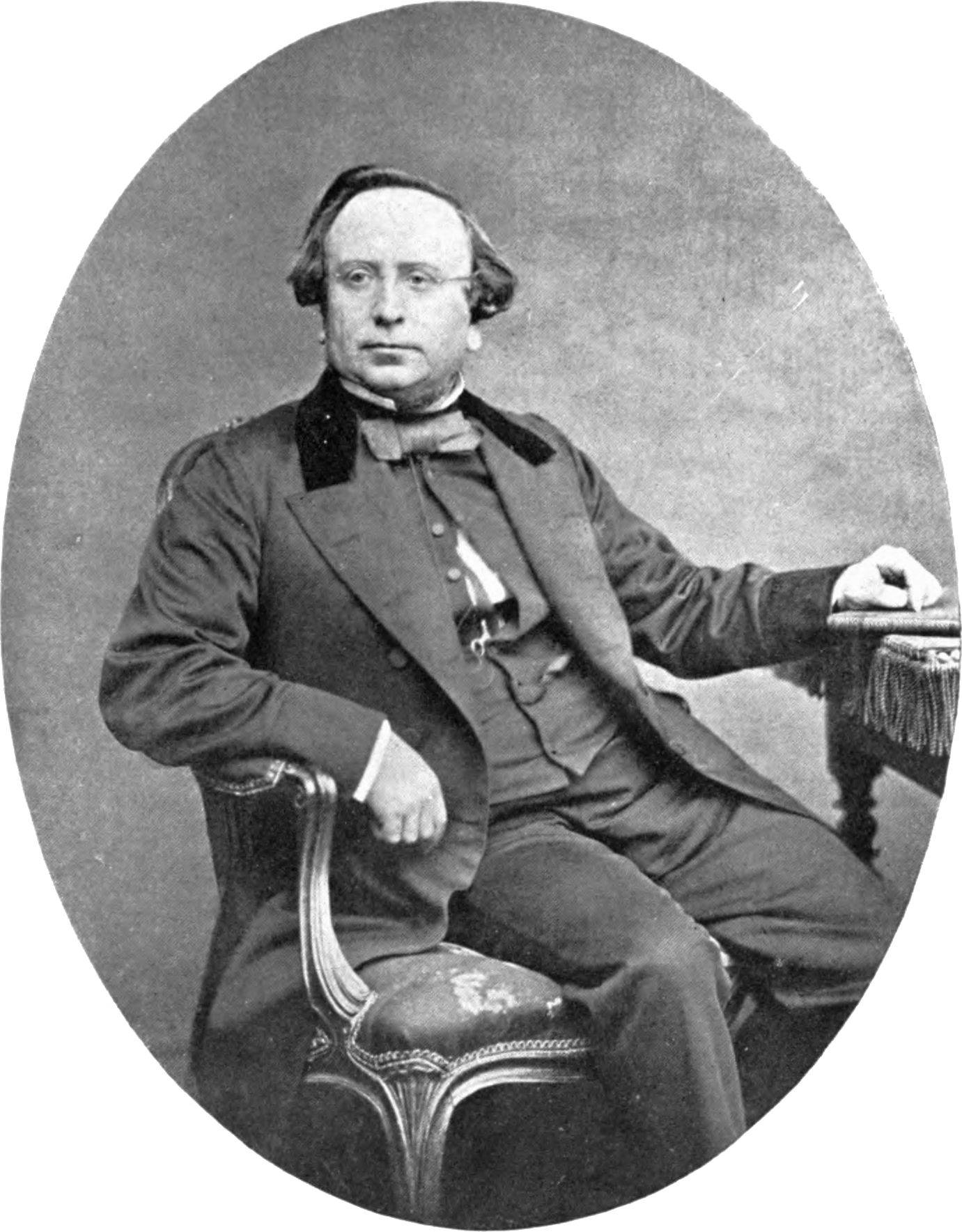
Grossmith's father

George Grossmith was born in Islington, London, and grew up in St. Pancras and Hampstead, London. His father, also named George (1820–1880), was the chief reporter for The Times and other newspapers at the Bow Street Magistrates' Court and was also a lecturer and entertainer. His mother was Louisa Emmeline Grossmith née Weedon (d. 1882). Over the years, Grossmith's father spent less of his time at Bow Street and more of it touring as a performer. As a young man, Grossmith was usually credited as "Jnr" to distinguish him from his father, especially when they performed together, but for most of his career, he was credited simply as "George Grossmith". Later, his actor-playwright-theatre manager son was credited as George Grossmith "Jr" rather than "III"; some sources confuse the two men.

Grossmith had a younger sister, Emily, and younger brother, Weedon. In 1855, he went to boarding school at Massingham House on Haverstock Hill in the district of Hampstead. There he studied the piano and began to amuse his friends and teachers with shadow pantomimes, and later by playing the piano by ear. His family moved to Haverstock Hill when young Grossmith was 10, and he became a day student. At the age of 12, he transferred to the North London Collegiate School in Camden Town. He was back in St. Pancras by age 13. He was an avid amateur photographer and painter as a teenager, but it was his brother Weedon who went to art school. The Grossmith family had many friends engaged in the arts, including J. L. Toole, Ellen Terry, Henry Irving, H. J. Byron, Tom Hood, T. W. Robertson, and John Hollingshead (later, the manager of the Gaiety Theatre, London).

Grossmith had hoped to become a barrister. Instead, he worked for many years, beginning in the 1860s, training and then substituting for his father as the Bow Street reporter for The Times, among other publications, when his father was on his lecture tours. Among the cases on which he reported was the Clerkenwell bombing by the Fenians in 1867. At the same time as he began reporting, he began to write humorous articles for periodicals and to participate in amateur theatrical performances. He also joined his father in his entertainments, lectures, and imitations, and began to add music to the entertainments, which his father had not done.

=== Early performing career ===
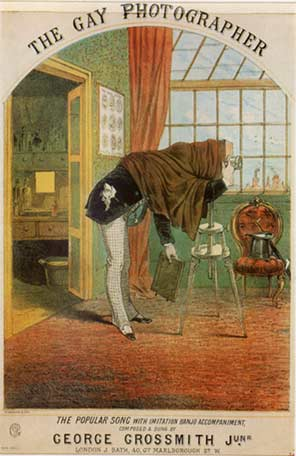
1870 sheet music

Young Grossmith received some recognition for amateur songs and sketches at private parties and, beginning in 1864, at penny readings. He also participated in a small number of theatricals as an amateur, including playing John Chodd Jr. in Robertson's play, Society, at the Gallery of Illustration, in 1868. The after-piece was a burlesque, written by Grossmith's father, on the Dickens play No Thoroughfare. He then played the title role in Paul Pry, a comedy by Poole, also at the Gallery of Illustration, in 1870. But he and his father felt that his talents lay in "sketch" comedy rather than theatre. The younger Grossmith admired the comic pianist and entertainer John Orlando Parry, who created and performed in many of the German Reed Entertainments, and he tried to emulate Parry in developing his own sketches, consisting of humorous anecdotes, mildly satirical comment, ad lib chat, and comic songs centred on the piano.

Grossmith took to the professional stage in 1870 with a sketch called Human Oddities, written by his father, and a song called "The Gay Photographer" (that is, the "carefree" photographer). The song, with words by Grossmith's father and music by young Grossmith, concerns a photographer who broke the heart of a young lady named Miss Jenkins; so she drank his chemicals and died. In late 1870, the younger Grossmith appeared on his own with a nightly spot at the "old Polytechnic" in Regent Street, where comic sketches alternated with scientific and serious lectures for the entertainment of the public. Human Oddities and another sketch, The Yellow Dwarf, were successful for Grossmith, and he took the former work on tour for six months. An 1871 Grossmith sketch was called He was a Careful Man. Biographer Tony Joseph notes that, except for a few early pieces, nearly all of Grossmith's material was written and composed by Grossmith himself. Joseph describes the sketches as "a light-hearted sending up of various aspects of contemporary life and manners. ...he was the complete performer... as a pianist (he performed for the most part sitting at a piano)... as a raconteur... as a mimic, facial expression, timing—he had it all. A short, dapper figure, he turned his lack of inches to positive advantage, and audiences took to him everywhere."

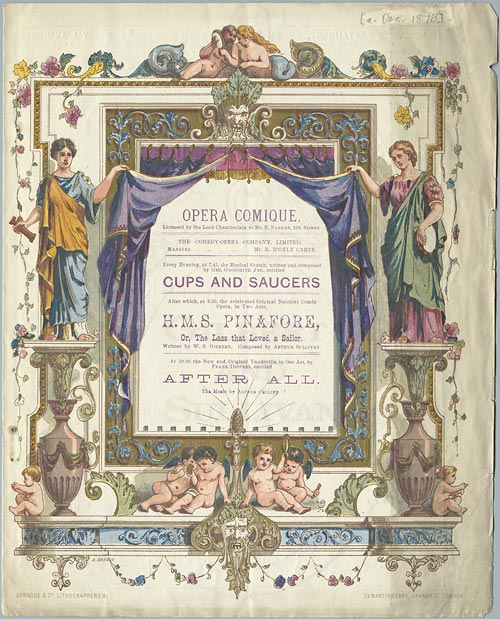
1878 programme for Cups and Saucers and H.M.S. Pinafore

Grossmith toured in the summer of 1871 with Mr and Mrs Howard Paul and occasionally afterwards. He and Mrs Paul would also appear together in The Sorcerer in 1877. Also in 1871, at the Polytechnic, he performed three more sketches, The Puddleton Penny Readings, Theatricals at Thespis Lodge and The Silver Wedding (including what would be one of his most popular songs, "I am so Volatile", with words by his father). On 14 February 1872, Grossmith gave a sketch parody of a penny reading at the Gaiety Theatre, London, since on Ash Wednesday, theatres refrained from presenting costumed performances out of respect for the holiday. At the time, coincidentally, the Gaiety was presenting Thespis, Gilbert and Sullivan's first collaboration. Throughout these years, Grossmith continued working at Bow Street during the day. In 1873, Grossmith married Emmeline Rosa Noyce (1849–1905), the daughter of a neighbourhood physician, whom he had met years earlier at a children's party. The couple had four children: George, an actor, playwright and theatre manager; Sylvia (1875–1932; married Stuart James Bevan in 1900); Lawrence, an actor, primarily in America; and Cordelia Rosa (1879–1943). The family lived initially in Marylebone before moving, about 1885, to Dorset Square nearby.

In 1873, Grossmith and his father began joint tours of humorous recitations and comic sketches at literary institutes and public halls, to church groups and to branches of the YMCA all over England and even in Scotland and Wales. Young Grossmith's sketches at this time included The Puddleton Penny Readings, Our Choral Society and In the Stalls. They toured almost constantly for the following three years, but they returned to see their families in London on weekends. Around this time, he met and became firm friends with Fred Sullivan, and afterwards, he met Sullivan's brother Arthur. Through Arthur Cecil, Sullivan, and some of their friends, Grossmith began to be invited to entertain at private "society" parties, which he continued to do throughout his career. Later, these parties would often occur late in the evening after Grossmith performed at the Savoy Theatre. In 1876, he collaborated with Florence Marryat, the author and reciter, on Entre Nous. This piece consisted of a series of piano sketches, alternating with scenes and costumed recitations, including a two-person "satirical musical sketch", really a short comic opera, called Cups and Saucers, which they then toured. Grossmith also took a number of engagements, including recitals at private homes. In 1877, Lionel Brough introduced another popular Grossmith song, "The Muddle Puddle Junction Porter". By then, Grossmith had become friendly with many in the music and theatre establishments, including Arthur Sullivan and impresario Richard D'Oyly Carte; and Grossmith had the opportunity to perform in Gilbert and Sullivan's Trial by Jury and other Sullivan works at charity benefits.

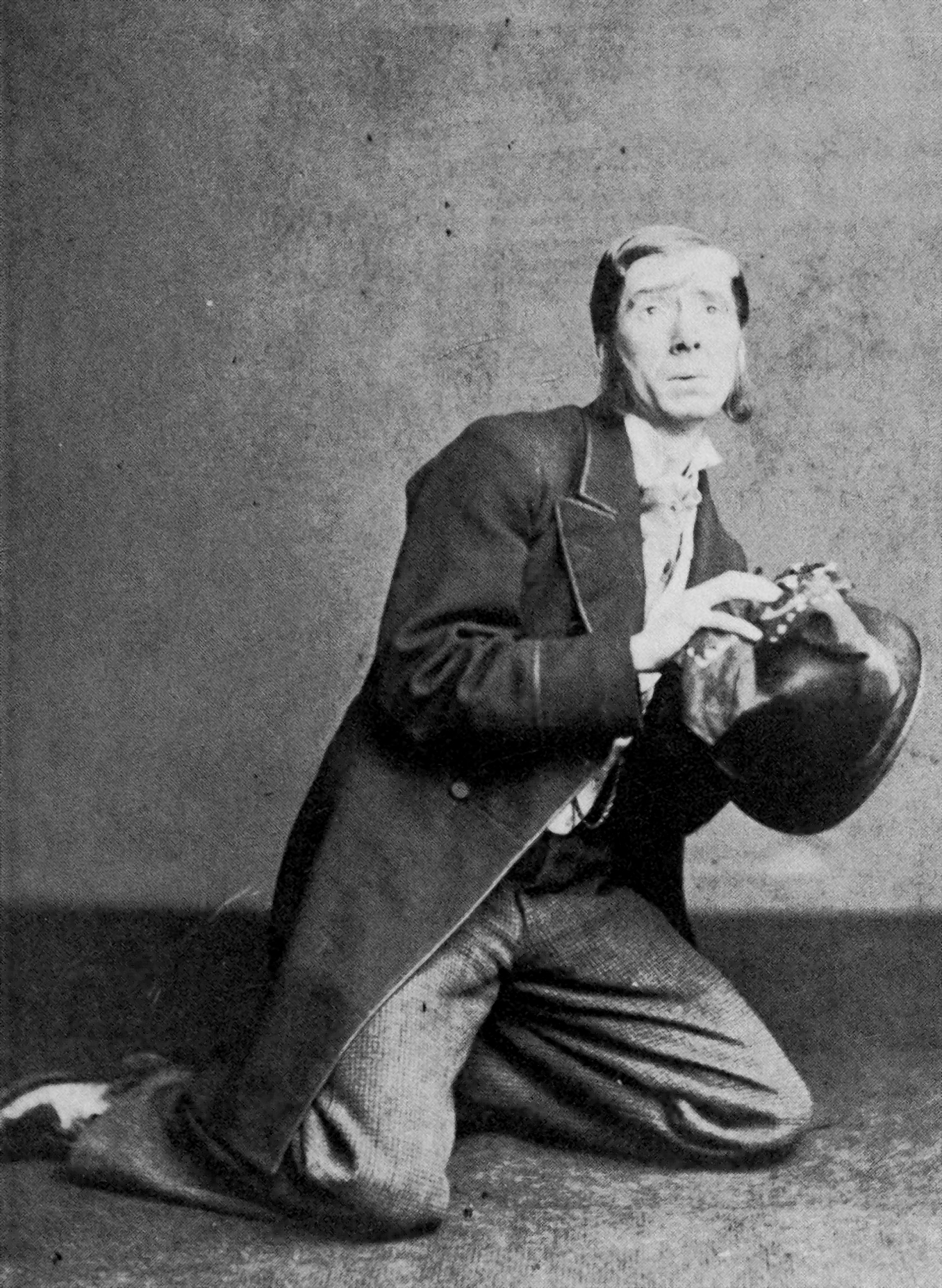
Grossmith as Wells in The Sorcerer, 1877

After entertaining professionally in sketch comedy for seven years, however, Grossmith discovered that his income decreased each year as his family and household expenses increased. He also disliked travelling. Accordingly, he was pleased when, despite his relative inexperience in legitimate theatre, he received a letter from Arthur Sullivan in November 1877 inviting him to take a part in his new piece with W. S. Gilbert: The Sorcerer.

=== D'Oyly Carte years ===
Grossmith had appeared in charity performances of Trial by Jury, where both Sullivan and Gilbert had seen him (indeed, Gilbert had directed one such performance, in which Grossmith played the judge), and Gilbert had earlier commented favourably on his performance in Tom Robertson's Society at the Gallery of Illustration. Sullivan mentioned to Arthur Cecil, the leading tenor from the Gallery of Illustration, that he was looking for someone to play the comic title role in his new comic opera, The Sorcerer. Cecil reminded Sullivan about Grossmith, and Sullivan seized on the idea. After singing for Sullivan, upon meeting Gilbert, Grossmith wondered aloud if the role should be played by "a fine man with a fine voice". Gilbert replied, "That is exactly what we don't want." Although Grossmith had reservations about cancelling his touring engagements and going into the "wicked" professional theatre (a move that might lose him church and other engagements in the future), and Richard D'Oyly Carte's backers objected to casting a sketch comedian in the central role of a comic opera, Grossmith was hired.

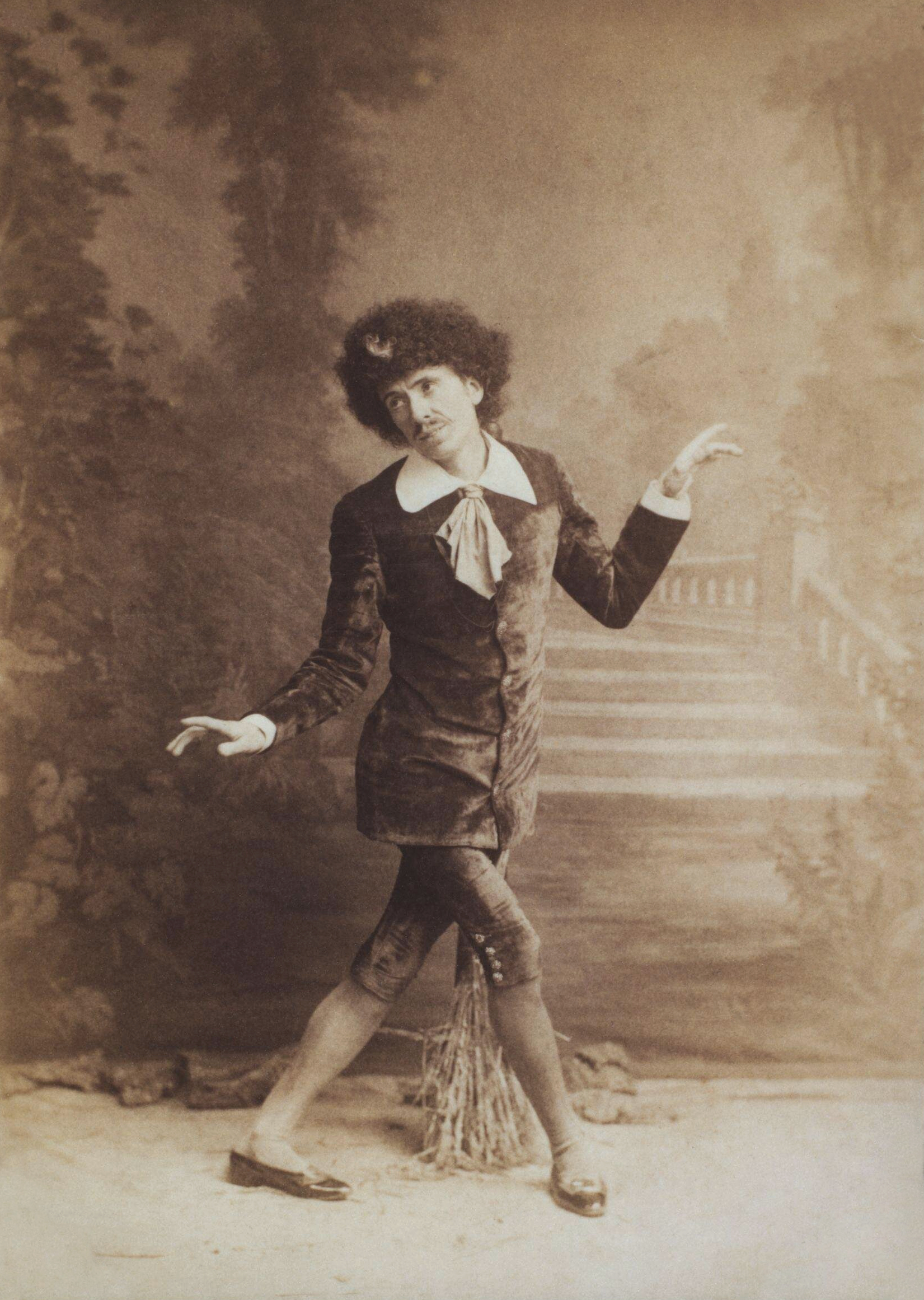
Grossmith as Bunthorne in Patience, 1881

Grossmith was a hit as the tradesmanlike John Wellington Wells, the title role in The Sorcerer, and became a regular member of Richard D'Oyly Carte's company. He created all nine of the lead comic baritone roles in Gilbert and Sullivan's Savoy Operas in London from 1877 to 1889, including the pompous First Lord of the Admiralty, Sir Joseph Porter, in H.M.S. Pinafore (1878); Major-General Stanley in The Pirates of Penzance, who is an expert at everything except "military knowledge" (1880); the aesthetic poet, Reginald Bunthorne in Patience (1881); the love-lonely Lord Chancellor in Iolanthe (1882); the sarcastic cripple, King Gama, in Princess Ida (1884); Ko-Ko the cheap tailor, elevated to the post of Lord High Executioner, in The Mikado (1885); the accursed Robin Oakapple in Ruddigore (1887); and the pathetic jester, Jack Point, in The Yeomen of the Guard (1888). On 29 January 1887, one week after the opening night of Ruddigore, Grossmith fell dangerously ill. However, by 13 February, his physicians pronounced him convalescent, and he resumed the role of Robin by 18 February. During Grossmith's absence, his understudy Henry Lytton, who would later become the principal comedian of the company, had the opportunity to perform the role in Grossmith's place.

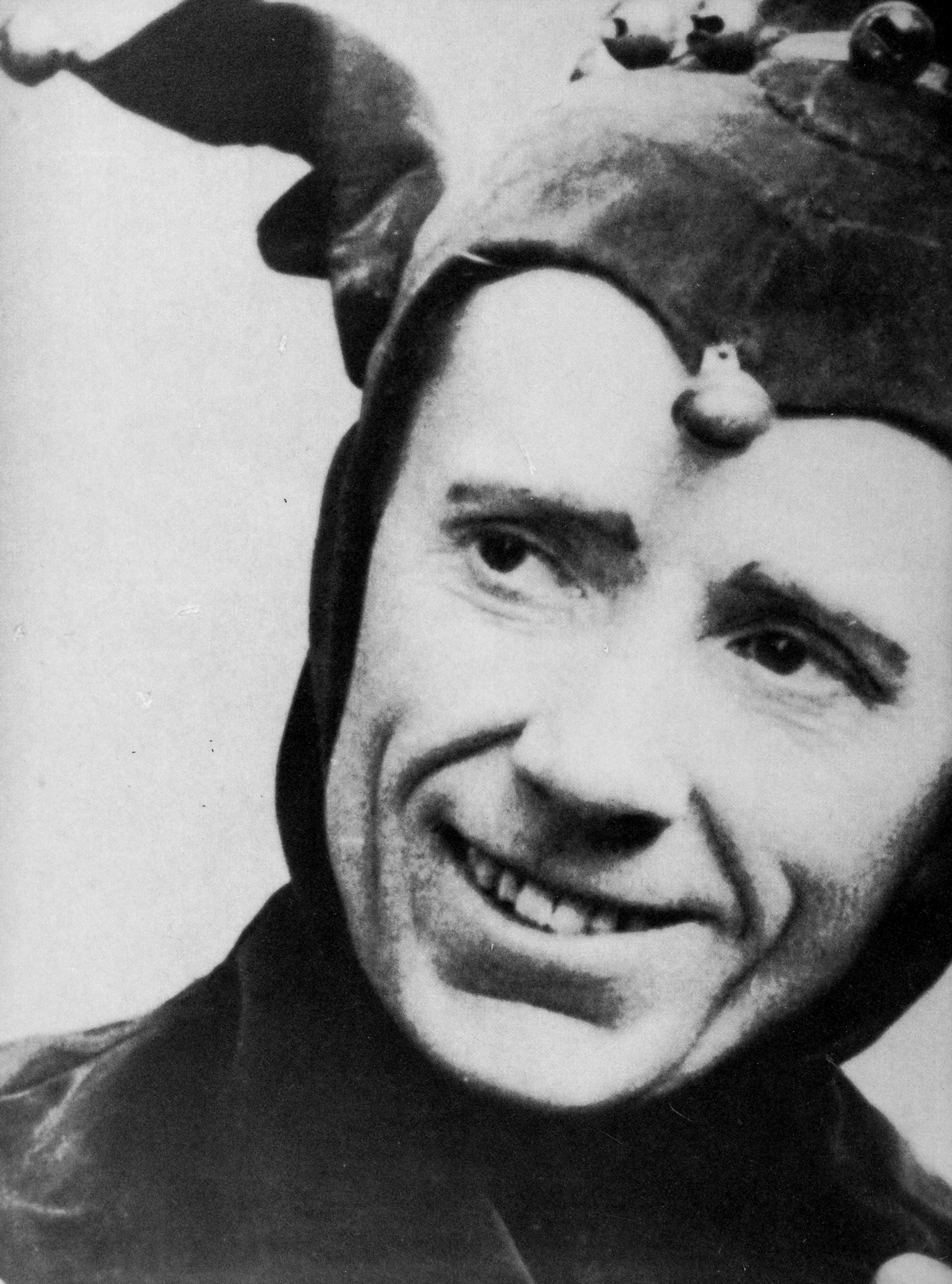
Grossmith as Jack Point in Yeomen, 1888

Years later, Grossmith's obituary in The Times noted the comedian's "nimbleness, his diverting tricks, his still more diverting dignity—the dignity of a man of few inches high or round—and his incomparable power of rapid speech and singing." The Daily Telegraph wrote of his Jack Point: "Whether giving expression to poor Jack's professional wit, or hiding a sorry heart behind light words... Mr Grossmith was master of the part he assumed." In 1883, The Times, reviewing a matinee performance of Iolanthe, wrote: "Mr. Grossmith's impersonation of the Lord Chancellor has ... become an exquisitely refined satire." On the other hand, his sketch comedy background had trained Grossmith to improvise comic business. Gilbert and the actor had an exchange during rehearsals for The Mikado about an improvised moment in which Jessie Bond pushed Grossmith, as they kneeled before the Mikado, and he rolled completely over. Gilbert requested that they cut out the gag, and Grossmith replied: "but I get an enormous laugh by it". Gilbert replied "So you would if you sat on a pork-pie."

The actor, jittery on opening nights, is depicted both on and off stage in the biographical film, Topsy Turvy. Hesketh Pearson wrote in 1935 that Grossmith injected himself with drugs to calm his nerves, and in the film he is shown injecting himself on the opening night of The Mikado. In his diary, Arthur Sullivan wrote afterwards, "All went very well except Grossmith, whose nervousness nearly upset the piece". Grossmith spoke self-deprecatingly about his own vocal prowess (Sullivan and others disagreed):

Of course, I haven't any voice to speak of, but I have a great register, and Sullivan used to amuse himself by making me sing bass in one number of an opera and tenor in another. In Ruddygore, Sir Arthur had engaged a man to play the servant, my menial, so to speak, who had an enormous bass voice, and who had to go down to the lower E flat. Singularly enough, he could go down to G, and then he dropped out entirely, and I did the [low E-flat] below. Generally the audience roared with laughter, and it absolutely brought down the house.

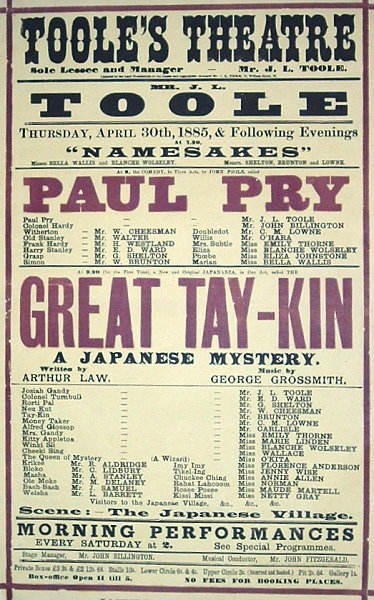
Grossmith's The Great Tay-Kin

During his time with the D'Oyly Carte Opera Company, Grossmith's father and mother died (in 1880 and 1882, respectively). Throughout this period, Grossmith continued to perform his sketches, often late at night after performing at the Savoy, and continued to write new sketches, such as Amateur Theatricals (1878), A Juvenile Party (1879), A Musical Nightmare (1880), and A Little Yachting (1886). He also wrote the music for Arthur Law's short comic opera, Uncle Samuel (1881), the one-act curtain raiser that preceded Patience on the Opera Comique programme. His Cups and Saucers was revived and played with Pinafore and also played by the company on tour. Other comic operas by Grossmith during these years included Mr Guffin's Elopement (1882) and A Peculiar Case (1884, both with libretti by Arthur Law) and The Real Case of Hide and Seekyll (1886). Grossmith also continued to give his "society" and other entertainments, often late at night after his performance at the Savoy. He also composed the music for another comic opera, The Great Tay-Kin and another piece, both with libretti by Arthur Law, which were performed at Toole's Theatre in 1885.

Grossmith also wrote, composed, and performed in several one-man drawing room sketches, short comic operas or monologues that were given at the Opera Comique or the Savoy Theatre in place of the companion pieces when shorter matinee programmes were playing. These works included Beauties on the Beach (1878), Five Hamlets (1878), a revival of his A Silver Wedding (1879), The Drama on Crutches (1883), Homburg, or Haunted by The Mikado (1887–88), and Holiday Hall (1888). In reviewing a matinee performance of The Drama on Crutches, The Times commented, "he not only satirizes the present tendency of fashionable amateurs to join the stage, but also parodies ... the manner of Mr. Irving and other actors of the present day, including himself. The sketch created great amusement, though of course, it depends entirely for its success upon the actor's powers of mimicry." Grossmith also performed in charity events, including as Bouncer in Cox and Box in 1879 at the Opera Comique.

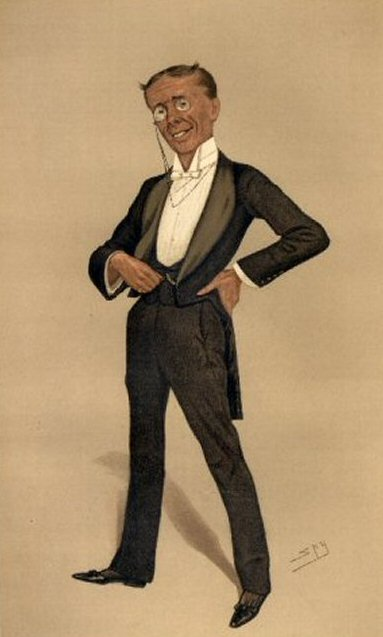
Caricature of Grossmith in Vanity Fair, 1888

In addition, Grossmith's comic song written in 1886, "See Me Dance the Polka", was extremely popular. It has been used in a number of films and has been quoted or referred to in literature and music, including in the poem/song "Polka" from Façade by Edith Sitwell and William Walton. Other songs he wrote during this period include "An Awful Little Scrub" (1880), "The Speaker's Eye" (1882), "The 'Bus Conductor's Song" (1883), "How I Became an Actor" (1883), "See Me Reverse" (1884), "The Lost Key" (1885), and "The Happy Fatherland" (1887).

=== Later years ===
Grossmith left the D'Oyly Carte company near the end of the original run of The Yeomen of the Guard on 17 August 1889 and resumed his career entertaining at the piano, which he continued to do for more than 15 years afterwards. Despite his dislike of travelling, he toured in Britain, Ireland, and, on five occasions, North America. His drawing-room sketches included his own popular songs, such as "See Me Dance the Polka", "The Happy Fatherland", "The Polka and the Choir-boy", "Thou of My Thou", "The French Verbs", "Go on Talking – Don't Mind Me", "I Don't Mind Flies". His new sketches during this period included Modern Music and Morals (1889), On Tour; or, Piano and I (1891), A Seaside Holiday (1892), Fashionable Music (1892) and Is Music a Failure? (1892). According to The Times, "His genial satire was enjoyed even by those at whom its shafts were aimed." When he toured Scotland in the autumn of 1890, Grossmith gave a command performance for Queen Victoria at Balmoral Castle. He also composed the music for a three-act comic opera with a libretto by Gilbert, Haste to the Wedding (1892). In this piece, his son George Grossmith Jr. made his stage debut. Musically more challenging than any composition he had attempted before, this work was unsuccessful. Later, however, Grossmith said that the experience of writing with Gilbert was one of the happiest of his life. In 1892–93 he toured North America (his second tour there), writing successful new sketches, "How I Discovered America" and "Baby on the Shore" (1893).

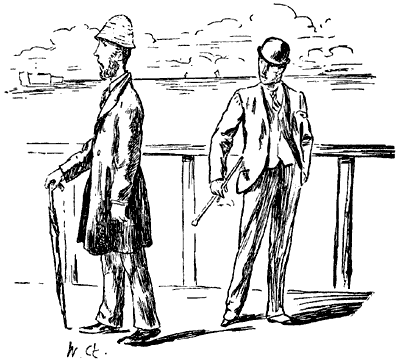
Charles (left) and Lupin Pooter at Broadstairs, from Chapter VI of The Diary of a Nobody

In 1892, Grossmith collaborated with his brother Weedon Grossmith to expand a series of amusing columns they had written in 1888–89 for Punch. The Diary of a Nobody was published as a novel and has never been out of print since. The book is a sharp analysis of social insecurity, and Charles Pooter of The Laurels, Brickfield Terrace, Holloway, was immediately recognised as one of the great comic characters of English literature. The work has itself been the object of dramatisation and adaptation, including three times for television: 1964, 1979 and 2007.

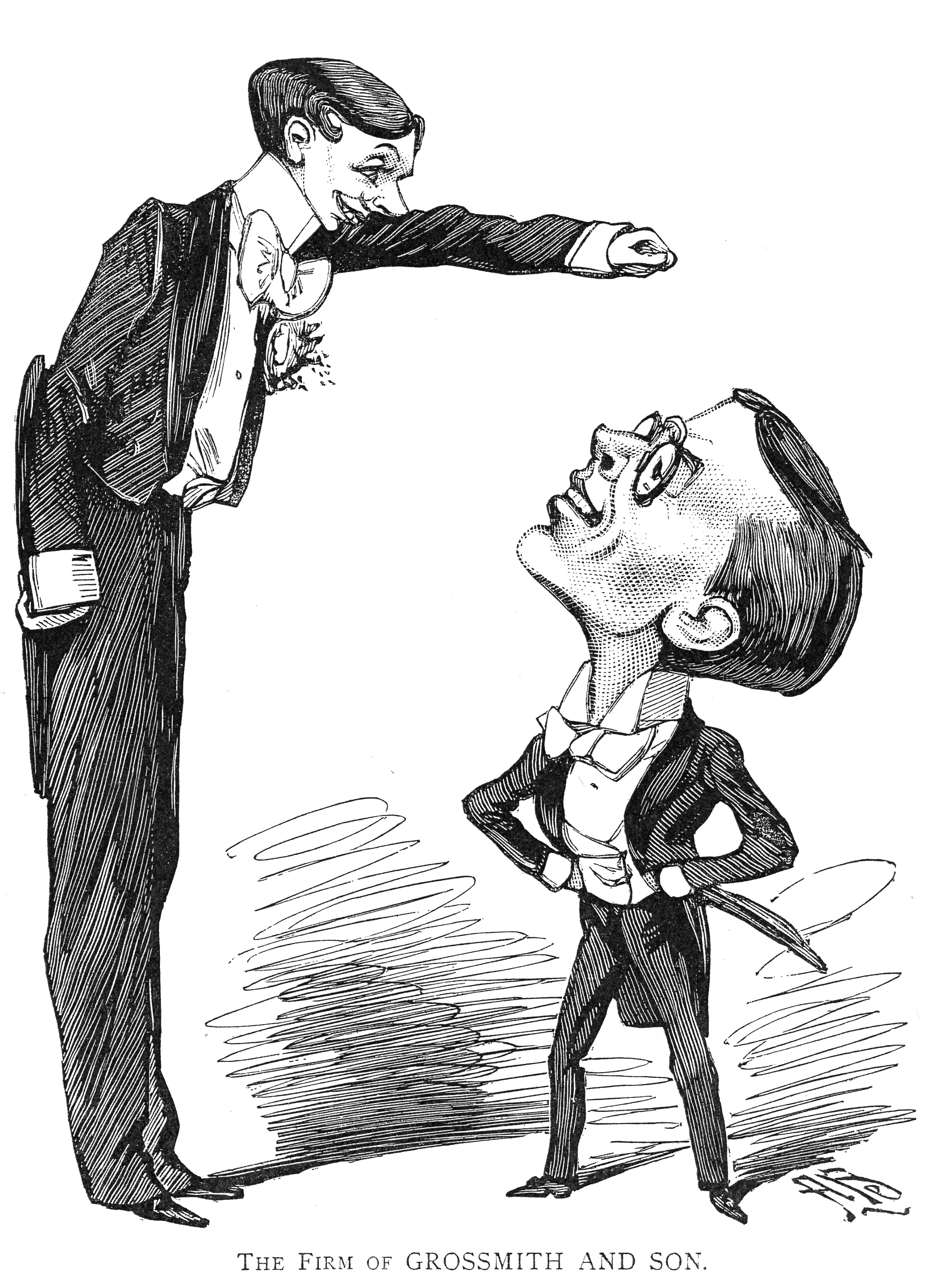
"The Firm of Grossmith and son"

Grossmith had become the most popular solo entertainer of his day, and his tours earned him far more than he had earned while performing with the D'Oyly Carte Opera Company. He also continued to compose music, including the comic opera Castle Bang (1894) and the sketches The Ibsenite Drama (1895) and Do We Enjoy Our Holidays? (1897) and songs like "The Baby on the Shore" (1893), "Johnnie at the Gaiety" (1895), "Tommy's First Love" (1897), and "The Happy Old Days at Peckham" (1903). In 1894–95, however, Gilbert enticed Grossmith to take the role of George Griffenfeld in His Excellency, with music by Frank Osmond Carr. Also in 1897, he played briefly as King Ferdinand V of Vingolia in F. C. Burnand's His Majesty at the Savoy Theatre and made two more short London stage appearances thereafter, as Scoones in Young Mr Yarde (1898) and Lambert Simnel in The Gay Pretenders (1900). An 1896 interview of Grossmith reveals him feeling his age and considering the end of his touring career, while enjoying time spent at home with his family, dogs and antique piano collection.

Grossmith suffered from depression after the death of his wife of cancer in 1905, and his health began to fail, so that he increasingly missed engagements. He was nevertheless persuaded to continue giving his entertainments, which he did on a less frequent basis, until November 1908. The following year, Grossmith retired to Folkestone, Kent, a town that he had visited for many years, where he wrote his second volume of reminiscences, Piano and I (1910).

Grossmith died at his home in Folkestone at the age of 64. He is buried in Kensal Green Cemetery, in the London Borough of Brent. In his will, dated 26 October 1908, Grossmith left small bequests to a variety of charities and persons; 2,000 pounds, artworks and heirlooms to each of his children (except that Lawrence did not receive a cash bequest), his son George receiving also "two silver bowls presented to him by [Gilbert, Sullivan and] Carte [and] the ivory baton with which he conducted the orchestra on the occasion of his said son's first appearance on the stage" in Haste to the Wedding; and smaller bequests to his children's spouses and his nieces, nephews, grandchildren and some cousins, with the residuary estate shared equally by his children (although the residuary estate was not large).

== Writings and compositions; legacy; recordings ==
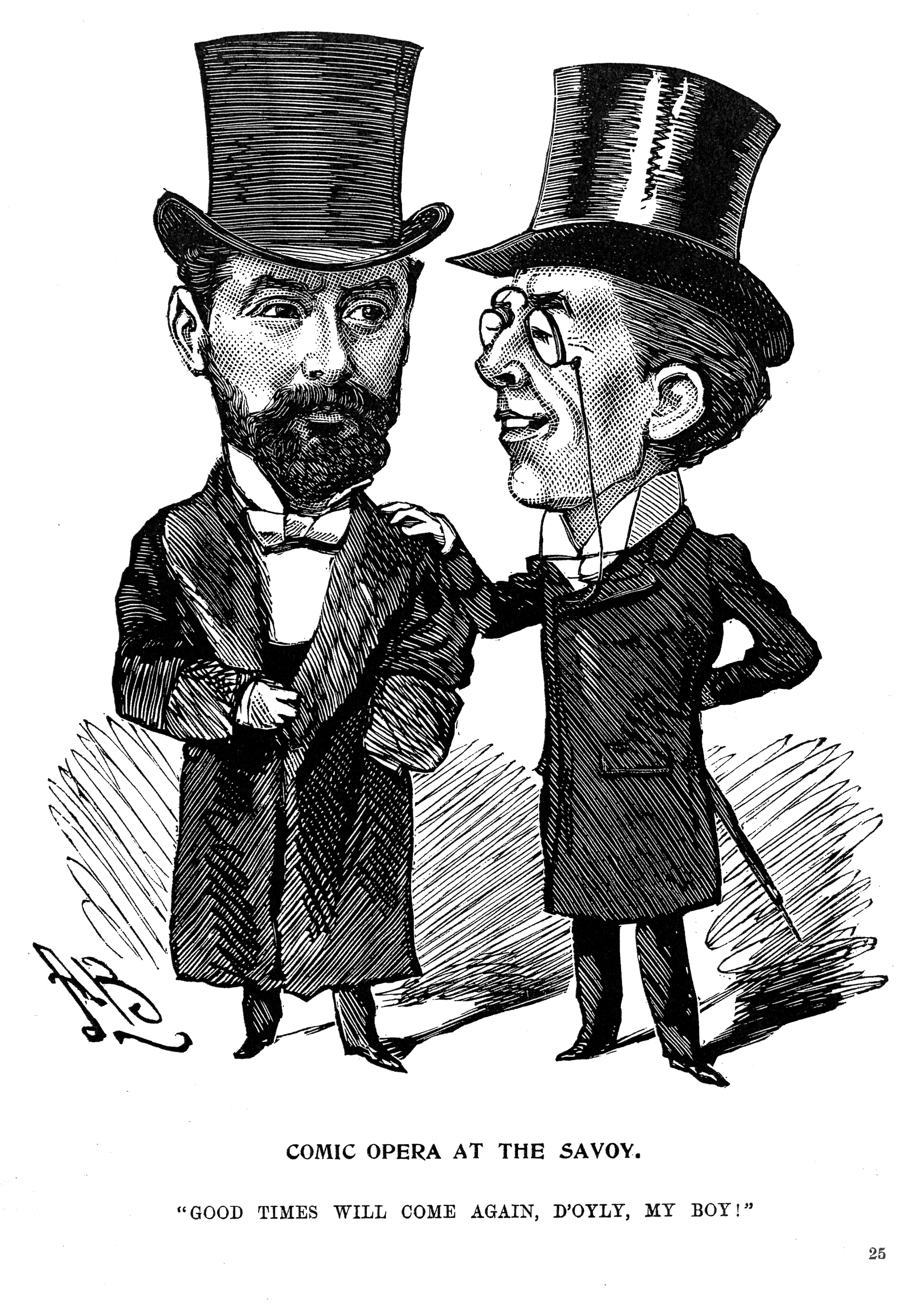
Comforting Carte after the failure of The Grand Duke

Grossmith wrote numerous comic pieces for the magazine Punch, including a series of ten skits in 1884 inspired by his Bow Street experiences, which he called "Very Trying". He also wrote two memoirs, A Society Clown: Reminiscences (1888) and Piano and I: Further Reminiscences (1910). In his career, Grossmith wrote 18 comic operas, nearly 100 musical sketches, some 600 songs and piano pieces, and three books. He also wrote both serious and comic pieces for newspapers and magazines throughout his career, displaying a wide range of styles.

Grossmith was followed, in the Gilbert and Sullivan comic roles, by a number of other popular performers; those who played his roles at the Savoy Theatre for an extended period of time have included Henry Lytton, Martyn Green, Peter Pratt and John Reed, among others. Over forty of the songs that Grossmith wrote or performed in his one-man shows have been recorded by baritone Leon Berger (a British Gilbert & Sullivan singer and Grossmith scholar), accompanied by Selwyn Tillett (G&S scholar) on two CDs: A Society Clown: The Songs of George Grossmith and The Grossmith Legacy. The latter also contains the recorded voice of Grossmith's son, George Grossmith Jr. Both are on the Divine Art Label. No recordings of Grossmith's voice are known to exist, although wax cylinder recording technology was available during his lifetime. Cups and Saucers was recorded by Retrospect Opera in 2016, together with F. C. Burnand and Edward Solomon's Pickwick.

=== Writings ===
- Grossmith, George (1888). A Society Clown: Reminiscences. Bristol/London: Arrowsmith. Accessed 9 March 2008
- Grossmith, George and Weedon Grossmith (1892). The Diary of a Nobody. Bristol: Arrowsmith.
- Grossmith, George (1910). Piano and I: Further Reminiscences. Bristol: Arrowsmith.
- Grossmith, George (2009) [1904]. Sylvia Grossmith Bevan and Cordelia Grossmith (ed.). The George Grossmith Birthday Book (PDF). Los Angeles: David Trutt.
- Grossmith, George, ed. David Trutt (2009). George Grossmith Songs and Sketches (PDF). Los Angeles: David Trutt.

=== Portrayals ===
Grossmith was portrayed by Martyn Green in the 1953 film The Story of Gilbert and Sullivan and by Martin Savage in the 1999 film Topsy-Turvy. Simon Butteriss portrayed Grossmith in the 2006 television documentary A Salaried Wit: Grossmith, Gilbert and Sullivan and in the five-part 2015 15 Minute Drama "I Am the Very Model of a Modern Major-General" on BBC Radio 4. Butteriss also presents a documentary about Grossmith as a bonus disc to the 2010 Sky Arts DVD set, A Motley Pair. Many of Grossmith's songs have been recorded by baritone Leon Berger.

John Reed played Grossmith in Melvyn Morrow's one-man biographical musical A Song to Sing, O at the Savoy Theatre in 1981. The same role was later played in Australia by Anthony Warlow in 1987, Dennis Olsen in 1991 and by Butteriss at the International Gilbert and Sullivan Festival in Buxton in 2003.
