= Elsie Spain =

English singer and actress (1879–1970)

Elsie Spain in 1910

Elsie Spain (1879 – 28 May 1970; born Elsie Butler) was an English opera singer and actress, best known for her performances in soprano roles of the Savoy Operas with the D'Oyly Carte Opera Company from 1908 to 1910 and in operettas and Edwardian musical comedies. She was one of the last leading ladies in the Gilbert and Sullivan roles personally trained by W. S. Gilbert. Among her roles in musicals, she originated the part of Princess Mathilde in the long-running The Quaker Girl.

== Life and career ==
=== Early years ===
Spain was born in Reigate, Surrey. She studied at the Guildhall School of Music, after which, she began to perform on the concert stage. As an amateur with the Sydenham Operatic Society in 1897, she played Theresa in The Mountebanks by W. S. Gilbert and Alfred Cellier. She made her professional debut in 1907 as understudy to Isabel Jay as Sally in the musical Miss Hook of Holland at the Prince of Wales's Theatre, playing the role for two months in 1908.

=== D'Oyly Carte ===
Spain joined the D'Oyly Carte Opera Company in July 1908 in its second repertory season at the Savoy Theatre, playing Josephine in H.M.S. Pinafore. In September of that year, she left the company to play Bridgette in the musical The Hon'ble Phil at the Hicks Theatre. The show was not a particular success; it closed in December, by which time Spain had returned to the Savoy, taking over from Clara Dow as Phyllis in Iolanthe from November. She then reprised the role of Josephine and next played Yum-Yum in The Mikado in December 1908. In January 1909, she first played Gianetta in The Gondoliers and in March of that year played Elsie Maynard in The Yeomen of the Guard. The Billboard commented that Spain was "the greatest discovery [Helen Carte] has made for many years. She has a beautiful voice, and her charm of face and figure, coupled with some very dainty acting, are making her one of the big hits of the present season." A reviewer wrote of Spain in The Times: "Her voice is powerful and pleasing, and her high notes are effectively used." Spain and Clara Dow, the two sopranos who played leading roles in the 1908–09 season, were the last D'Oyly Carte principal sopranos personally trained by W. S. Gilbert.

Spain left the D'Oyly Carte when its London season ended, but she had drawn the attention of C. H. Workman, the principal comic of the company, and when he became the manager of the Savoy Theatre in late 1909, he engaged her to star as Clarice in The Mountaineers, which ran into February 1910. The critics praised her performance. Workman also wished to engage her for the leading role of Selene in Fallen Fairies, but W. S. Gilbert insisted on casting Nancy McIntosh instead. Spain rejoined the D'Oyly Carte on tour in November 1909, again succeeding Dow in the roles of Josephine, Mabel in The Pirates of Penzance, the title role in Patience, Phyllis, the title role in Princess Ida, Yum-Yum, Elsie and Gianetta.

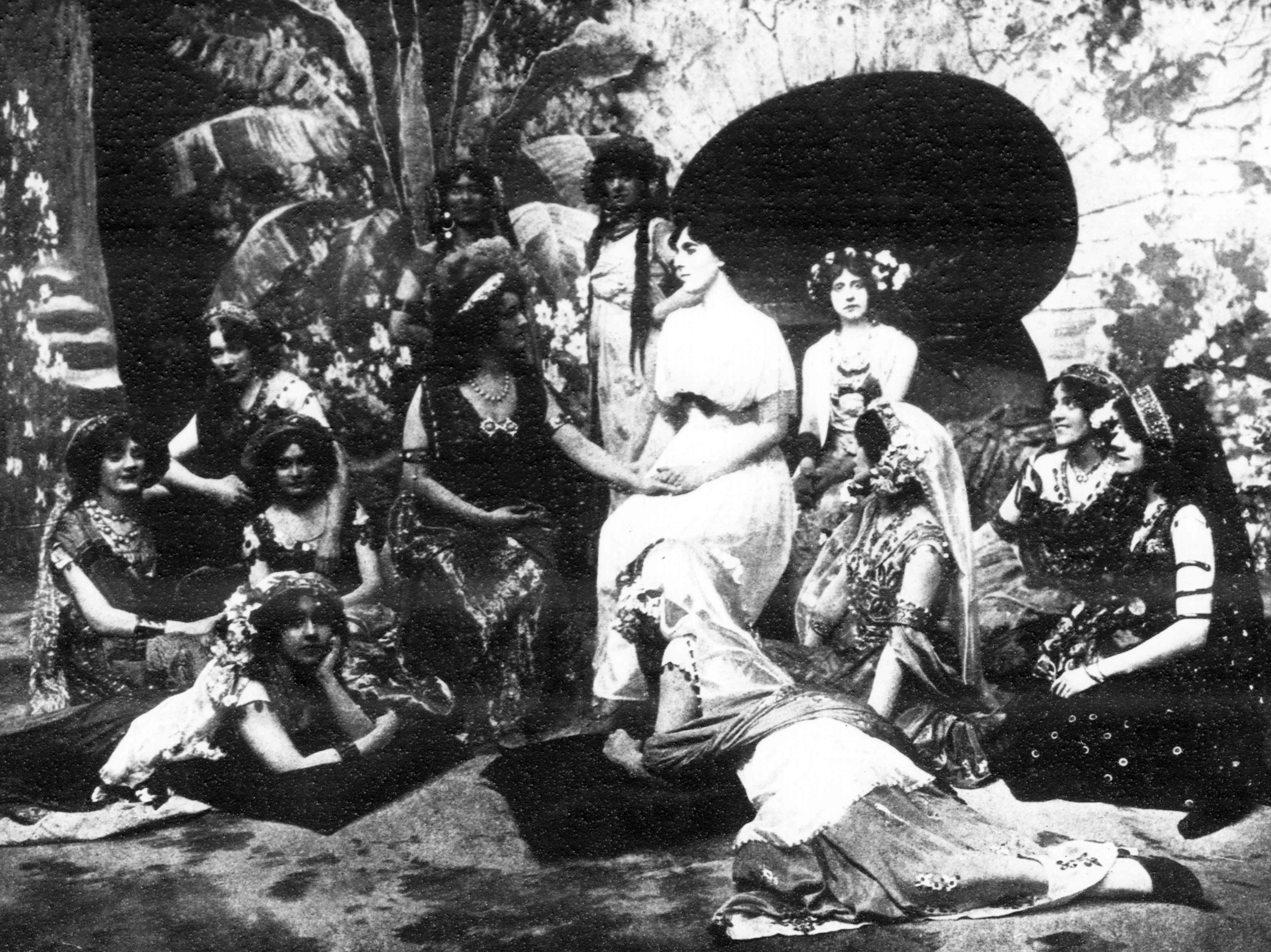
Scene from The Islander, 1910

=== West End and Australia ===
In London's West End, she starred as Kitty Mclan in The Islander at the Apollo Theatre in 1910; one critic commented: "Spain ... is an actress who can sing and a singer who can act". She next played Mascha in The Chocolate Soldier at the Lyric Theatre, London (1910) and had a long run as Princess Mathilde in The Quaker Girl at the Adelphi Theatre (1910–12). She then played Bella in The Dancing Mistress at the Adelphi from 1912 to 1913. She travelled to Australia in 1914 to play in musicals and operetta with the J. C. Williamson Company but was back in London the next year as the Bride in The Best Man at the London Pavilion and the New Theatre. In 1916, she appeared in Fun and Fancy at the London Palladium, and she toured in variety shows in 1919.

Spain married George Lathrop Weir Rickett. She died in 1970 at age 91.

== Recordings ==
Her only known recording is a duet of the song "I Have a Song to Sing, Oh" from The Yeomen of the Guard, together with C. H. Workman, made in 1910. It was re-released on compact disc in The Art of the Savoyard, Pearl GEMM CD 9991.

Spain (centre, in white) as Josephine in 1908 D'Oyly Carte production of H.M.S. Pinafore
