= Jessie Rose =

English actress and singer (1875–1928)

Jessie Rose as Zayda in Fallen Fairies

Jessie Kate Rose (18 November 1875 – 27 May 1928) was an English opera singer and actress primarily known for her performances as principal mezzo-soprano in the Gilbert and Sullivan comic operas with the D'Oyly Carte Opera Company. From 1896 to 1899 she originated several mostly smaller roles in Savoy operas and then continued to play a variety of smaller and larger roles in repertory with the company. She was its principal mezzo-soprano from 1904 to 1909.

== Life and career ==
=== Early life and career ===
Rose was born in Uxbridge, Middlesex, to Henry Rose, a tinsmith, and his wife Ellen (née Masters). She was educated at Ealing and was given music lessons. In 1893 she enrolled at the Royal Academy of Music, earning a bronze medal in singing.

She joined the D'Oyly Carte Opera Company in 1896 in the chorus of a revival of The Mikado at the Savoy Theatre. In March of that year she originated the small role of Bertha in The Grand Duke, and in February 1897 she created another small part, Helena, in His Majesty (1897). In August of that year, she married the composer and violinist Percy Elliott (1870–1932), a fellow alumnus of the Royal Academy of Music; they had a daughter, born in 1898, and a son, born in 1900. At the Savoy, Rose continued to perform in the chorus in the company's repertory productions and also originated the minor roles of Margery in Old Sarah (1897–1898) and Oasis (and sometimes covered Princess Laoula) in The Lucky Star (1899). In revivals, she played Amelie in The Grand Duchess of Gerolstein (1897–98), and Vittoria in The Gondoliers (1898). In mid-1899, she toured with the company in Haddon Hall, probably in the role of Deborah. She then returned to the Savoy until March 1900, playing the larger role of the Plaintiff in Trial by Jury (1899) and originating the substantial part of Scent-of-Lilies in The Rose of Persia (1899–1900).

Rose as Tessa in The Gondoliers (1906)

Rose left D'Oyly Carte for a year and a half, but rejoined the company on tour from 1901 to 1902 as Lady Rosie Pippin in The Emerald Isle. She then played the Gilbert and Sullivan roles of Isabel in The Pirates of Penzance, Lady Ella in Patience, Leila in Iolanthe, Lady Psyche in Princess Ida, Peep-Bo in The Mikado, Kate in The Yeomen of the Guard, and the leading role of Gianetta in The Gondoliers. She also understudied and occasionally played the leading roles of Yum-Yum in The Mikado, and the title role in Princess Ida. In 1903, she continued to play most of these roles in repertory and added the role of Minnie Hill in Bob, a curtain raiser that accompanied Pirates. She also briefly appeared as Pitti-Sing in The Mikado. In May 1903 her husband abandoned her and their two small children and went to South Africa. The couple divorced in 1908.

=== Principal mezzo-soprano and later years ===
Although her earlier roles had been in soprano parts, in 1904 Rose became the company's leading mezzo-soprano, touring in the roles of Hebe in H.M.S. Pinafore, Edith in Pirates, Lady Angela in Patience, the title character in Iolanthe, Melissa in Princess Ida, Pitti-Sing in The Mikado, Phoebe in Yeomen and Tessa in The Gondoliers. A review of Rose noted that she "acted and sang charmingly as Phoebe. ... [A]s Iolanthe [she was] especially good and sang splendidly and in faultless tune." In Bob, she appears to have switched to the role of Lady Mabel. In the company's first London repertory season at the Savoy Theatre (1906–07) she played her same roles in Yeomen, The Gondoliers, Patience and Iolanthe. She then returned to the company's repertory touring schedule in all her Gilbert and Sullivan roles. In the company's second London repertory season (1908–09), she played Pitti-Sing, Hebe, Iolanthe, Edith, Tessa and Phoebe. She then continued to tour with the company as principal mezzo-soprano until June 1909.

Rose returned to the Savoy under the management of C. H. Workman, originating the roles of Annette in The Mountaineers (September to November 1909) and Zayda in Fallen Fairies (December 1909 to January 1910). She retired from the stage five days before her second marriage; her second husband was Henry Joseph Ford, a member of a prosperous family of hoteliers. They had one son, born in 1911. Rose's last known public performance was in the role of Iolanthe in a single performance at a charity "Gilbert and Sullivan Pageant" at Cassiobury Park, Hertfordshire in 1919.

She died in Sunningdale, Berkshire in 1928 at the age of 52.
