= 1900 in British music =

This is a summary of 1900 in music in the United Kingdom.

== Events ==
- 3 March – Joseph Holbrooke‘s orchestral tone poem The Raven is given at the Crystal Palace – the first major recognition for the 22 year-old composer after leaving the Royal Academy of Music three years earlier.
- 22 March – Samuel Coleridge-Taylor conducts all three parts of his Hiawatha trilogy of works for chorus and orchestra at the Royal Albert Hall, including the first performance of part three, Hiawatha's Departure.
- April – Charles Villiers Stanford resigns from the Irish Literary Society in protest at anti-monarchist sentiments expressed by W. B. Yeats.
- 25 June – Charles Villiers Stanford's cantata, The Last Post, is privately premièred at Buckingham Palace.
- 28 June – Frederick Cowen's Concertstuck for piano and orchestra, written in 1897, is performed by the Polish pianist Paderewski at Queen's Hall in a Royal Philharmonic Society concert.
- 19 August – The first performance of the Pelléas et Mélisande suite, compiled from incidental music written in 1897 by William Wallace, takes place at The Tower, New Brighton.
- 2 October – The Soldier's Tent for baritone and orchestra by Hubert Parry is performed for the first time, in Birmingham.
- 3 October – Edward Elgar's The Dream of Gerontius receives its première in Birmingham.
- 8 November – The Piano Quintet in C, Op. 6 by Donald Tovey is performed for the first time at St James's Hall in London.
- 22 November – An honorary doctorate in music is conferred on Edward Elgar by the University of Cambridge.
- 27 November – The Sérénade lyrique for small orchestra by Edward Elgar, composed in 1899, is performed in its orchestral version for the first time at St. James' Hall, London.
- unknown date – Arnold Bax enters the Royal Academy of Music.

== Popular music ==
- "I Love You, Ma Cherie", words and music by Paul Rubens, music by Edward Elgar.
- "Violets", words by Julian Fane, music by Ellen Wright.

== Classical music: new works ==
- Frederic Austin – Overture to Richard II, for orchestra
- Granville Bantock – Thalaba the Destroyer (Tone Poem No. 1)
- Rutland Boughton – The Chilterns, symphonic suite
- Havergal Brian – Tragic Overture
- Samuel Coleridge-Taylor – Hiawatha's Departure, cantata
- Edward Elgar – The Dream of Gerontius
- Edward German – Nell Gwynne, incidental music
- Joseph Holbrooke
  - The Raven
  - Variations on 'Three Blind Mice', for orchestra
  - Variations on 'The Girl I Left Behind Me' for orchestra
- Gustav Holst
  - Ave Maria for eight-part female choir
  - Suite de Ballet
  - Symphony in F major "The Cotswolds"
- Hamish MacCunn – The Masque of War and Peace
- Sir John Blackwood McEwen – Graih My Chree, Recitation Music for 2 violins, viola, cello, piano and percussion
- Hubert Parry – Agamemnon, incidental music
- Percy Pitt – Ballade for violin and orchestra
- Cyril Scott – Symphony No. 1
- Ralph Vaughan Williams – Bucolic Suite for orchestra
- William Wallace – Jacobite Songs, for voice and orchestra

== Opera ==
- Kain, with music by Eugen d'Albert and libretto by Heinrich Bulthaupt (premièred in Berlin, Germany)

== Musical theatre ==
- 3 February – The Messenger Boy, by James T. Tanner and Alfred Murray, with lyrics by Adrian Ross and Percy Greenbank, and music by Ivan Caryll and Lionel Monckton (additional numbers by Paul Rubens), opens at the Gaiety Theatre, and runs for 428 performances.
- 26 April – Pretty Polly, by Basil Hood, with music by François Cellier, opens at the Theatre Royal, Colchester, as a companion piece to Hood and Sir Arthur Sullivan's The Rose of Persia. It later moves to the Savoy Theatre, for a run of 26 performances from 19 May 1900 to 28 June 1900, and from 8 December 1900 to 20 April 1901 along with the first revival of Gilbert and Sullivan's 1881 hit, Patience, a run of 102 performances.

== Births ==
- 23 January – William Ifor Jones, composer (d. 1988)
- 3 February – Mabel Mercer, English-born singer and actress (d. 1984)
- 6 February – Guy Warrack, composer, music educator and conductor (d. 1986)
- 2 June – David Wynne, Welsh composer (d. 1983)
- 10 July – Evelyn Laye, actress and singer (d. 1996)
- 12 September – Eric Thiman, composer (d. 1975)
- 17 December – George Lambert, operatic baritone and teacher (d. 1971)
- 22 December – Alan Bush, pianist, composer and conductor (d. 1995)

== Deaths ==
- 22 January – David Edward Hughes, musician and inventor, 68
- 13 March – Alicia Ann Spottiswoode, songwriter, 89
- 28 May – George Grove, compiler of the well-known dictionary of music, 79
- 22 November – Sir Arthur Sullivan, composer, 58 (kidney disease)
- 8 December – Henry Russell, pianist, baritone singer and composer

== See also ==
- 1900 in the United Kingdom
