= Savoy opera =

Opera genre

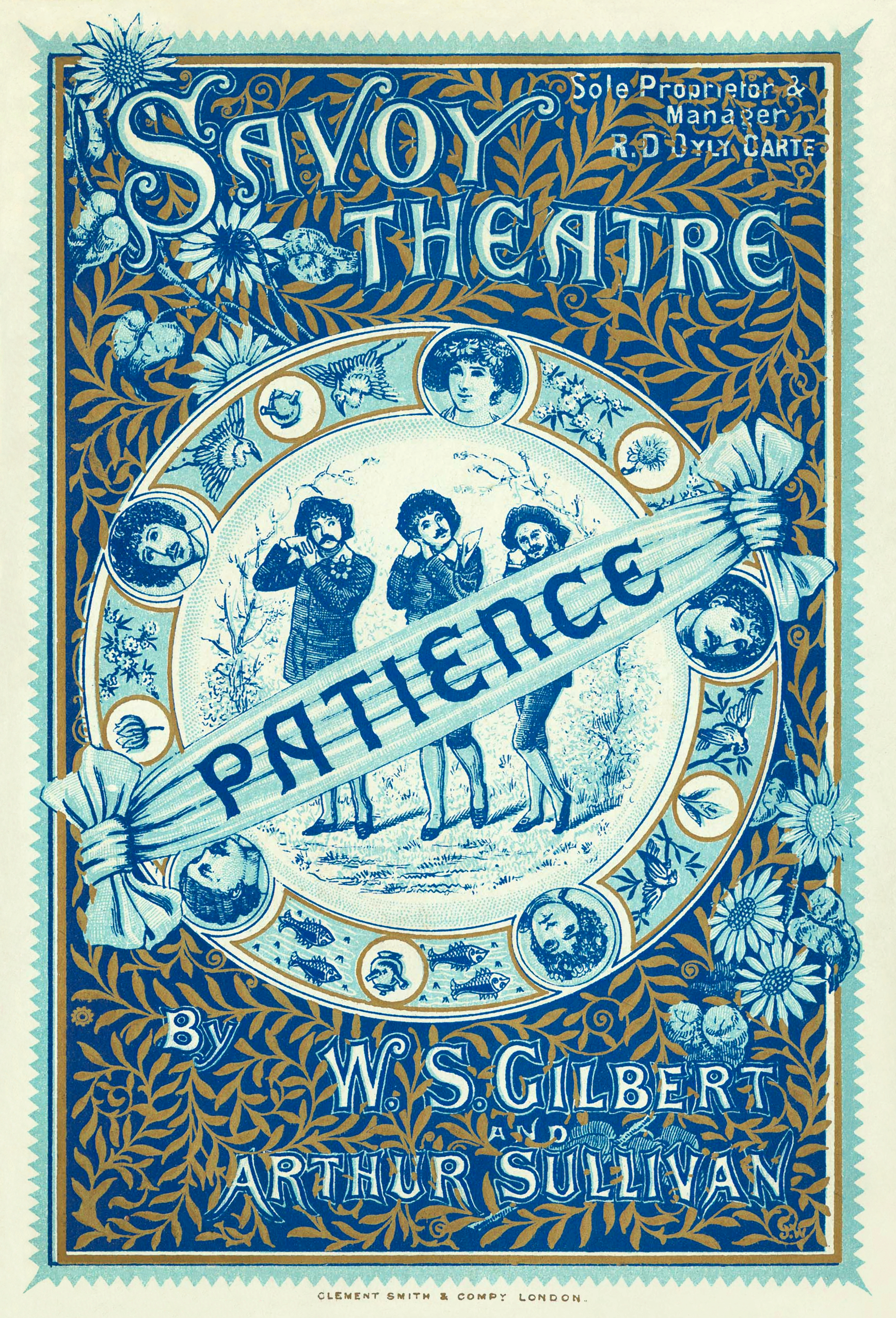
1881 Programme for Patience

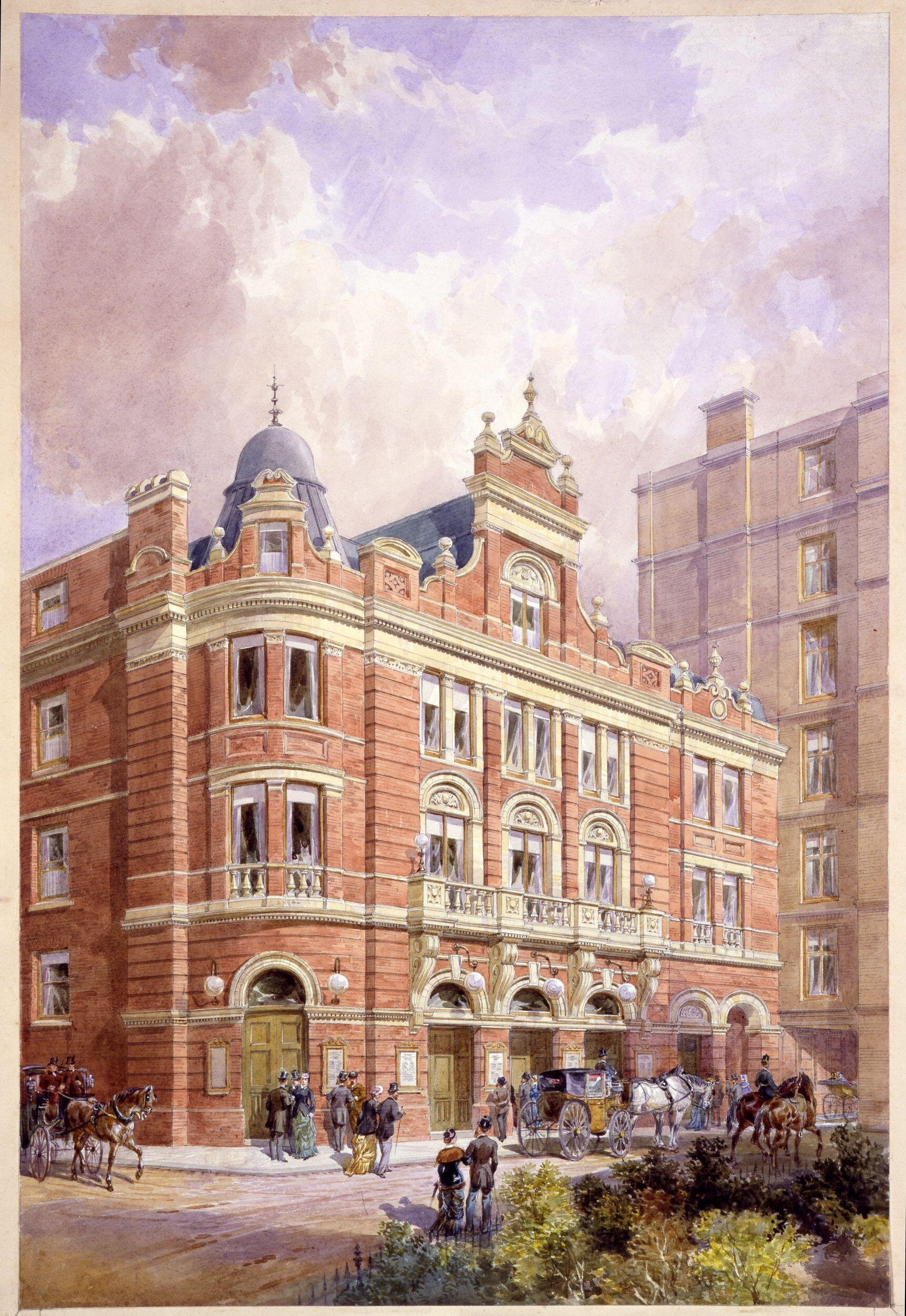
Savoy Theatre, c. 1881

Savoy opera was a style of comic opera that developed in Victorian England in the late 19th century, with W. S. Gilbert and Arthur Sullivan as the original and most successful practitioners. The name is derived from the Savoy Theatre, which impresario Richard D'Oyly Carte built to house the Gilbert and Sullivan pieces, and later those by other composer–librettist teams. The great bulk of the non-G&S Savoy Operas either failed to achieve a foothold in the standard repertory, or have faded over the years, leaving the term "Savoy Opera" as practically synonymous with Gilbert and Sullivan. The Savoy operas (in both senses) were seminal influences on the creation of the modern musical.

Gilbert, Sullivan, Carte and other Victorian era British composers, librettists and producers, as well as the contemporary British press and literature, called works of this kind "comic operas" to distinguish their content and style from that of the often risqué continental European operettas that they wished to displace. Most of the published literature on Gilbert and Sullivan since that time refers to these works as "Savoy Operas", "comic operas", or both. However, the Penguin Opera Guides and many other general music dictionaries and encyclopedias classify the Gilbert and Sullivan works as operettas.

Gilbert and Sullivan's early operas played at other London theatres, and Patience (1881) was the first opera to appear at the Savoy Theatre, and thus, in a strict sense, the first true "Savoy Opera", although the term "Savoy Opera" has, for over a century, referred to all thirteen operas that Gilbert and Sullivan wrote for Richard D'Oyly Carte.

== Other definitions ==
During the years when the Gilbert and Sullivan ("G&S") operas were being written, Richard D'Oyly Carte also produced, at the Savoy Theatre, operas by other composer–librettist teams, either as curtain raisers to the G&S pieces, or to fill the theatre when no G&S piece was available. To his contemporaries, the term "Savoy Opera" referred to any opera that appeared at that theatre, regardless of who wrote it.

Aside from curtain raisers (which are listed in the second table below), the G&S operas were the only works produced at the Savoy Theatre from the date it opened (10 October 1881) until The Gondoliers closed on 20 June 1891. Over the next decade, there were only two new G&S pieces (Utopia Limited and The Grand Duke), both of which had comparatively brief runs. To fill the gap, Carte mounted G&S revivals, Sullivan operas with different librettists, and works by other composer–librettist teams. Richard D'Oyly Carte died on 3 April 1901. If the nexus of Carte and the Savoy Theatre is used to define "Savoy Opera," then the last new Savoy Opera was The Rose of Persia (music by Sullivan, libretto by Basil Hood), which ran from 28 November 1899 to 28 June 1900.

After Carte's death, his wife Helen Carte assumed management of the theatre. In 1901, she produced Sullivan's last opera, The Emerald Isle (finished after Sullivan's death by Edward German), and during the run of that opera, she hired William Greet as manager of the theatre. Later that year, she leased the theatre to Greet, who then produced Ib and Little Christina, The Willow Pattern, a revival of Iolanthe, Merrie England (1902) and A Princess of Kensington (1903), each with a cast made up largely of Carte's Savoy company. Cyril Rollins and R. John Witts adopt A Princess of Kensington as the last of the Savoy Operas. After A Princess of Kensington closed in May 1903, Mrs. Carte leased the theatre to unrelated parties until late 1906, when she produced the first of her two seasons of G&S revivals in repertory at the Savoy, with Gilbert returning to direct.

Gilbert, Workman and German at a rehearsal

In March 1909, Charles H. Workman leased the theatre, producing three new pieces, including one by Gilbert, Fallen Fairies (music by Edward German). The last of these Workman-produced works came in early 1910, Two Merry Monarchs, by Arthur Anderson, George Levy, and Hartley Carrick, with music by Orlando Morgan. The contemporary press referred to these works as "Savoy Operas", and S. J. Adair Fitz-Gerald regarded Workman's pieces as the last Savoy Operas.

Fitz-Gerald wrote his book, The Story of the Savoy Opera, in 1924, when these other pieces were still within living memory. But over the ensuing decades, the works produced at the Savoy by composers and librettists other than Gilbert and Sullivan were forgotten or infrequently revived. The term "Savoy Opera" came to be synonymous with the thirteen extant works of Gilbert and Sullivan. The first collaboration of Gilbert and Sullivan – the 1871 opera Thespis – was not a Savoy Opera under any of the definitions mentioned to this point, as Richard D'Oyly Carte did not produce it, nor was it ever performed at the Savoy Theatre. Nevertheless, Rollins & Witts include it in their compendium of the Savoy Operas, as does Geoffrey Smith. The Oxford English Dictionary defines the phrase as: "Designating any of the Gilbert and Sullivan operas originally presented at the Savoy Theatre in London by the D'Oyly Carte company. Also used more generally to designate any of the Gilbert and Sullivan operas, including those first presented before the Savoy Theatre opened in 1881, or to designate any comic opera of a similar style which appeared at the theatre".

== Complete list ==
The following table shows all of the full-length operas that could be considered "Savoy Operas" under any of the definitions mentioned above. Only first runs are shown. Curtain-raisers and afterpieces that played with the Savoy Operas are included in the next table below.

Title	Librettist(s)	Composer(s)	Theatre	Opened	Closed	Perfs.
Thespis	W. S. Gilbert	Arthur Sullivan	Gaiety	26 December 1871	8 March 1872	64
Trial by Jury	W. S. Gilbert	Arthur Sullivan	Royalty	25 March 1875	18 December 1875	131
The Sorcerer	W. S. Gilbert	Arthur Sullivan	Opera Comique	17 November 1877	24 May 1878	178
H.M.S. Pinafore	W. S. Gilbert	Arthur Sullivan	Opera Comique	25 May 1878	20 February 1880	571
The Pirates of Penzance	W. S. Gilbert	Arthur Sullivan	Royal Bijou Theatre	30 December 1879	30 December 1879	1
The Pirates of Penzance	W. S. Gilbert	Arthur Sullivan	Fifth Avenue Theatre (NY)	31 December 1879	5 June 1880	100
The Pirates of Penzance	W. S. Gilbert	Arthur Sullivan	Opera Comique	3 April 1880	2 April 1881	363
Patience	W. S. Gilbert	Arthur Sullivan	Opera Comique	23 April 1881	8 October 1881	170
Patience	W. S. Gilbert	Arthur Sullivan	Savoy	10 October 1881	22 November 1882	408
Iolanthe	W. S. Gilbert	Arthur Sullivan	Savoy	25 November 1882	1 January 1884	398
Princess Ida	W. S. Gilbert	Arthur Sullivan	Savoy	5 January 1884	9 October 1884	246
The Mikado	W. S. Gilbert	Arthur Sullivan	Savoy	14 March 1885	19 January 1887	672
Ruddygore	W. S. Gilbert	Arthur Sullivan	Savoy	22 January 1887	5 November 1887	288
The Yeomen of the Guard	W. S. Gilbert	Arthur Sullivan	Savoy	3 October 1888	30 November 1889	423
The Gondoliers	W. S. Gilbert	Arthur Sullivan	Savoy	7 December 1889	20 June 1891	554
The Nautch Girl	George Dance & Frank Desprez	Edward Solomon	Savoy	30 June 1891	16 January 1892	200
The Vicar of Bray	Sydney Grundy	Edward Solomon	Savoy	28 January 1892	18 June 1892	143
Haddon Hall	Sydney Grundy	Arthur Sullivan	Savoy	24 September 1892	15 April 1893	204
Jane Annie	J. M. Barrie & Arthur Conan Doyle	Ernest Ford	Savoy	13 May 1893	1 July 1893	50
Utopia Limited	W. S. Gilbert	Arthur Sullivan	Savoy	7 October 1893	9 June 1894	245
Mirette	Harry Greenbank & Fred E. Weatherly (revised by Adrian Ross)	André Messager	Savoy	3 July 1894	11 August 1894	41
Mirette	Harry Greenbank & Fred E. Weatherly (revised by Adrian Ross)	André Messager	Savoy	6 October 1894	6 December 1894	61
The Chieftain	F. C. Burnand	Arthur Sullivan	Savoy	12 December 1894	16 March 1895	97
The Grand Duke	W. S. Gilbert	Arthur Sullivan	Savoy	7 March 1896	10 July 1896	123
His Majesty	F. C. Burnand, R. C. Lehmann, & Adrian Ross	Alexander Mackenzie	Savoy	20 February 1897	24 April 1897	61
The Grand Duchess of Gerolstein (Note: The production was variously billed as The Grand Duchess of Gerolstein or just The Grand Duchess.)	Charles H. Brookfield & Adrian Ross	Jacques Offenbach	Savoy	4 December 1897	12 March 1898	104
The Beauty Stone	A. W. Pinero & J. Comyns Carr	Arthur Sullivan	Savoy	28 May 1898	16 July 1898	50
The Lucky Star	Charles H. Brookfield, Adrian Ross, & Aubrey Hopwood	Ivan Caryll	Savoy	7 January 1899	31 May 1899	143
The Rose of Persia	Basil Hood	Arthur Sullivan	Savoy	29 November 1899	28 June 1900	213
The Emerald Isle	Basil Hood	Arthur Sullivan & Edward German	Savoy	27 April 1901	9 November 1901	205
Ib and Little Christina	Basil Hood	Franco Leoni	Savoy	14 November 1901	29 November 1901	16
The Willow Pattern	Basil Hood	Cecil Cook	Savoy	14 November 1901	29 November 1901	16
Merrie England	Basil Hood	Edward German	Savoy	2 April 1902	30 July 1902	120
Merrie England	Basil Hood	Edward German	Savoy	24 November 1902	17 January 1903	56
A Princess of Kensington	Basil Hood	Edward German	Savoy	22 January 1903	16 May 1903	115
The Mountaineers	Guy Eden	Reginald Somerville	Savoy	29 September 1909	27 November 1909	61
Fallen Fairies	W. S. Gilbert	Edward German	Savoy	15 December 1909	29 January 1910	51
Two Merry Monarchs	Arthur Anderson, George Levy, & Hartley Carrick	Orlando Morgan	Savoy	10 March 1910	23 April 1910	43

== Companion pieces ==
The fashion in the late Victorian era and Edwardian era was to present long evenings in the theatre, and so full-length pieces were often presented together with companion pieces. During the original runs of the Savoy Operas, each full-length work was normally accompanied by one or two short companion pieces. A piece that began the performance was called a curtain raiser, and one that ended the performance was called an afterpiece. W. J. MacQueen-Pope commented, concerning the curtain raisers:

This was a one-act play, seen only by the early comers. It would play to empty boxes, half-empty upper circle, to a gradually filling stalls and dress circle, but to an attentive, grateful and appreciative pit and gallery. Often these plays were little gems. They deserved much better treatment than they got, but those who saw them delighted in them. ... [They] served to give young actors and actresses a chance to win their spurs ... the stalls and the boxes lost much by missing the curtain-raiser, but to them dinner was more important.

The following table lists the known companion pieces that appeared at the Opera Comique or the Savoy Theatre during the original runs and principal revivals of the Savoy Operas through 1909. There may have been more such pieces that have not yet been identified. In a number of cases, the exact opening and closing dates are not known. Date ranges overlap, since it was common to rotate two or more companion pieces at performances during the same period to be played with the main piece.

Many of these pieces also played elsewhere (and often on tour by D'Oyly Carte touring companies). Only the runs at the Opera Comique and the Savoy are shown here.

Title	Librettist(s)	Composer(s)	Theatre	Opened	Closed	Played With
Dora's Dream	Arthur Cecil	Alfred Cellier	Opera Comique	17 November 1877	1878*	The Sorcerer
The Spectre Knight	James Albery	Alfred Cellier	Opera Comique	9 February 1878	23 March 1878	The Sorcerer
The Spectre Knight	James Albery	Alfred Cellier	Opera Comique	28 May 1878	10 August 1878	H.M.S. Pinafore
Trial by Jury	W. S. Gilbert	Arthur Sullivan	Opera Comique and Savoy	23 March 1878	24 May 1878	The Sorcerer
Trial by Jury	W. S. Gilbert	Arthur Sullivan	Opera Comique and Savoy	11 October 1884	12 March 1885	The Sorcerer
Trial by Jury	W. S. Gilbert	Arthur Sullivan	Opera Comique and Savoy	22 September 1898	31 December 1898	The Sorcerer
Trial by Jury	W. S. Gilbert	Arthur Sullivan	Opera Comique and Savoy	6 June 1899	25 November 1899	H.M.S. Pinafore
Beauties on the Beach	George Grossmith	George Grossmith	Opera Comique	25 May 1878	5 August 1878	H.M.S. Pinafore
Beauties on the Beach	George Grossmith	George Grossmith	Opera Comique	14 October 1878	5 December 1878*	H.M.S. Pinafore
Five Hamlets	George Grossmith	George Grossmith	Opera Comique	? 1878	12 October 1878	H.M.S. Pinafore
A Silver Wedding	George Grossmith	George Grossmith	Opera Comique	part of 1878		H.M.S. Pinafore
Cups and Saucers	George Grossmith	George Grossmith	Opera Comique	5 August 1878*	20 February 1880	H.M.S. Pinafore
After All!	Frank Desprez	Alfred Cellier	Opera Comique	16 December 1878*	20 February 1880	Cups and Saucers
After All!	Frank Desprez	Alfred Cellier	Opera Comique	? Feb. 1880	20 March 1880	H.M.S. Pinafore (Children's)
After All!	Frank Desprez	Alfred Cellier	Savoy	23 November 1895	4 March 1896	Mikado & The Grand Duke
After All!	Frank Desprez	Alfred Cellier	Savoy	4 April 1896	8 August 1896	Mikado & The Grand Duke
After All!	Frank Desprez	Alfred Cellier	Savoy	7 May 1897	16 June 1897	The Yeomen of the Guard
In the Sulks	Frank Desprez	Alfred Cellier	Opera Comique	21 February 1880	?	The Pirates of Penzance
In the Sulks	Frank Desprez	Alfred Cellier	Opera Comique	21 February 1880	20 March 1880	H.M.S. Pinafore (Children's)
In the Sulks	Frank Desprez	Alfred Cellier	Opera Comique	3 April 1880	2 April 1881	Pirates of Penzance
In the Sulks	Frank Desprez	Alfred Cellier	Opera Comique	23 April 1881*	2 May 1881	Patience
In the Sulks	Frank Desprez	Alfred Cellier	Savoy	11 October 1881	14 October 1881	Patience
Uncle Samuel	Arthur Law	George Grossmith	Opera Comique	3 May 1881	8 October 1881	Patience
Mock Turtles	Frank Desprez	Eaton Faning	Savoy	11 October 1881	22 November 1882	Patience
Mock Turtles	Frank Desprez	Eaton Faning	Savoy	25 November 1882	30 March 1883	Iolanthe
A Private Wire	Frank Desprez	Percy Reeve	Savoy	31 March 1883	1 January 1884	Iolanthe
The Carp	Frank Desprez & Arnold Felix	Alfred Cellier	Savoy	13 February 1886	19 January 1887	The Mikado
The Carp	Frank Desprez & Arnold Felix	Alfred Cellier	Savoy	21 February 1887	5 November 1887	Ruddigore
Mrs. Jarramie's Genie	Frank Desprez	Alfred Cellier & François Cellier	Savoy	14 February 1888	November 1889	H.M.S. Pinafore, Pirates, Mikado & Yeomen
Captain Billy	Harry Greenbank	François Cellier	Savoy	24 September 1891	16 January 1892	The Nautch Girl
Captain Billy	Harry Greenbank	François Cellier	Savoy	1 February 1892	18 June 1892	Vicar of Bray
Mr. Jericho	Harry Greenbank	Ernest Ford	Savoy	18 March 1893	15 April 1893	Haddon Hall
Mr. Jericho	Harry Greenbank	Ernest Ford	Savoy	3 June 1893	1 July 1893	Jane Annie
Quite an Adventure	Frank Desprez	Edward Solomon	Savoy	15 December 1894	29 December 1894	The Chieftain
Cox & Box	F. C. Burnand	Arthur Sullivan	Savoy	31 December 1894	16 March 1895	The Chieftain
Weather or No	Adrian Ross & William Beach	Bertram Luard-Selby	Savoy	10 August 1896	17 February 1897	The Mikado
Weather or No	Adrian Ross & William Beach	Bertram Luard-Selby	Savoy	2 March 1897	24 April 1897	His Majesty
Old Sarah	Harry Greenbank	François Cellier	Savoy	17 June 1897	31 July 1897	The Yeomen of the Guard
Old Sarah	Harry Greenbank	François Cellier	Savoy	16 August 1897	20 November 1897	The Yeomen of the Guard
Old Sarah	Harry Greenbank	François Cellier	Savoy	10 December 1897	12 March 1898	The Grand Duchess of Gerolstein
Old Sarah	Harry Greenbank	François Cellier	Savoy	22 March 1898*	21 May 1898	Gondoliers
Pretty Polly	Basil Hood	François Cellier	Savoy	19 May 1900	28 June 1900	The Rose of Persia
Pretty Polly	Basil Hood	François Cellier	Savoy	8 December 1900	20 April 1901	Patience
The Outpost	Albert O'Donnell Bartholeyns	Hamilton Clarke	Savoy	2 July 1900	3 November 1900	The Pirates of Penzance
The Outpost	Albert O'Donnell Bartholeyns	Hamilton Clarke	Savoy	8 November 1900*	7 December 1900	Patience
The Willow Pattern	Basil Hood	Cecil Cook	Savoy	14 November 1901	29 November 1901	Ib and Little Christina
The Willow Pattern (revised version)	Basil Hood	Cecil Cook	Savoy	9 December 1901	29 March 1902	Iolanthe
A Welsh Sunset	Frederick Fenn	Philip Michael Faraday	Savoy	15 July 1908	17 October 1908	H.M.S. Pinafore & Pirates
A Welsh Sunset	Frederick Fenn	Philip Michael Faraday	Savoy	2 December 1908	24 February 1909	H.M.S. Pinafore & Pirates

*Indicates an approximate date.

== Sources ==
- Farrell, Scott (2009). The C. H. Workman Productions: A Centenary Review of the Final Savoy Operas. Scott Farrell.
- Fitz-Gerald, S. J. Adair (1924). The Story of the Savoy Opera. London: Stanley Paul & Co.
- Rollins, Cyril; R. John Witts (1962). The D'Oyly Carte Opera Company in Gilbert and Sullivan Operas: A Record of Productions, 1875–1961. London: Michael Joseph. OCLC 504581419.
