= Guy Eden =

British-Australian lawyer and writer (1864–1954)

Guy Ernest Morton Eden (6 May 1864 – 5 December 1954) was a lawyer, novelist, poet and librettist.

Born in Australia, Eden was educated in England, practised law in New South Wales and then London, and was a legal adviser to two British government departments. As a writer, between 1892 and 1931 he produced two novels, a volume of poetry, the book and lyrics for operas and musical comedies, and was co-author of two plays. Among his works was The Mountaineers (1909), one of the last Savoy operas.

== Life and career ==
=== Early years ===
Eden was born on 6 May 1864 in Brisbane, the elder son of English parents temporarily based in Australia, Charles Henry Eden and his wife Georgina, née Hill. He was educated at Westminster School, after which he returned to Australia and practised as a barrister in New South Wales. In 1897 he married Ethel, daughter of William Holman. They had three sons and one daughter. 1901 he was called to the Bar by the Inner Temple in London.

Eden twice (1903–1905 and 1907–1913) served as lawyer to the Board of Education, and from 1914 to 1918 he was attached to the directorate of military intelligence at the War Office. In 1918 he became editor of The Navy.

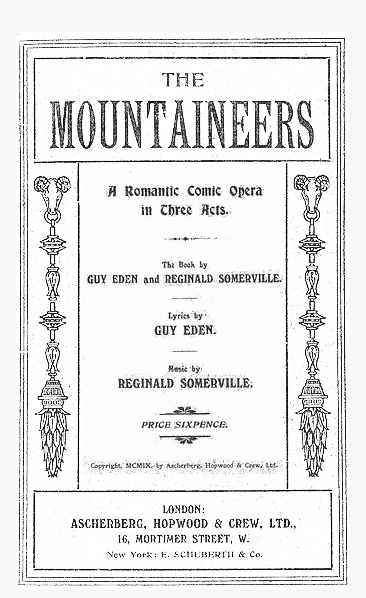
Cover of vocal score of The Mountaineers

Eden was the author of two novels. The first, The Cry of the Curlew (1892), was sub-titled "A Yarn from the Bush". The reviewer in The Globe observed:

Mr Guy Eden makes a promising beginning as a story-teller. He appears to be familiar with Australia, whose scenery and people gives incidentally some life-like sketches. …The Cry of the Curlew [is] not any means a love story only, but is marked by some stirring episodes of bush-ranging life.

The second of Eden's novels was He Went Out with the Tide (1896), a work with some autobiographical elements. The Academy praised its "natural pathos". Eden also published a book of verse with an Australian setting, entitled Bush Ballads (1907). A contemporary reviewer commented that although the verses were full of technical faults, they "are the real thing; they have the rough vigour of a young country".

=== Stage works ===
Eden was responsible for the libretto of the one-act romantic opera The 'Prentice Pillar (1895), which was produced at Her Majesty's Theatre in 1897. It was not well received; the music, by Reginald Somerville, was found "pretentious" and "commonplace", and Eden's libretto was termed "wantonly tragic", of "extreme crudeness of construction", ending with "terrible issues that are not adequately prepared".

Eden and Somerville collaborated again, on a comic opera, The Mountaineers, produced at the Savoy Theatre in 1909. It received a better reception than their earlier work. The Times commented that "it provides a very pleasant, pretty, amusing entertainment. ... A good story, well told; but told without wit, without distinction." The Manchester Guardian found both the story and music "simple and charming" but felt that the subject was not "strong enough to occupy a whole evening". Eden wrote the book and lyrics of "an original musical comedy extravaganza", Goldman, Ltd (1916) with music by Arthur Aiston.

In 1925 Eden again worked with Somerville, providing the lyrics and co-writing the book of the show The Love Doctor, presented by and starring Arthur Treacher. Eden was co-author of two non-musical plays: a comedy, When the Clock Strikes (1930) and a Ruritanian adventure, The Gun Runner (1931). The Stage records that he also wrote the words for many popular songs.

Eden died at his home in London on 5 December 1954, aged 90, survived by his widow and their four children.

== Sources ==
- Rollins, Cyril; R. John Witts (1962). The D'Oyly Carte Opera Company in Gilbert and Sullivan Operas: A Record of Productions, 1875–1961. London: Michael Joseph. OCLC 504581419.
