= Amy Evans =

Welsh soprano and actress (1884–1983)

Evans in A Waltz Dream in 1911

Amy Evans (24 October 1884 – 5 January 1983) was a Welsh soprano and actress known for her performances in oratorio, recitals, and opera. She also made some music recordings beginning in 1906. In 1910, she played the leading role of Selene in W. S. Gilbert's last opera, Fallen Fairies, and sang at the Royal Opera House the same year and thereafter. She played Princess Helena in A Waltz Dream at Daly's Theatre in 1911.

After Evans married Scottish baritone Fraser Gange in 1917, the two frequently performed together in concert and on tour, moving to the United States in 1923. In 1975, at age 91, Evans gave her last performance. She was one of the last surviving cast members of a W. S. Gilbert production.

== Biography ==
The birthplace of Amy Evans is variously given as Ynyshir or nearby Tonypandy, Wales. While not of upper-class descent, Evans came from a home less humble than accounts of her ancestry often suggest. The usual description of her father, Thomas Vaughan Evans, as a coal miner, although not altogether inaccurate, somewhat understates his standing; he was an official in the Naval Colliery Company. Moreover, Amy was the product of a musical household in which singing was valued, as her mother, Leah, and her grandmother both were active and recognised as church singers.

Besides general studies at her local board school, Evans had some early singing lessons with Ivor Foster. In 1896, she began vocal studies with David Lloyd, organist and choirmaster of St. Andrew's Church in Tonypandy and a recognised pianist in South Wales. In recognition of Evans's musical promise, local benefactors inaugurated a fund to further her musical education. In 1899, at age 14, Evans won the soprano prize at the Welsh National Eisteddfod in Cardiff, Wales for a performance of "Hear ye, Israel" from Mendelssohn's Elijah. Presenting her with the award was the celebrated Welsh tenor Ben Davies, who described her as "a great natural singer" and foretold a stellar future for her, assuming "proper training".

=== Early career ===
Evans began a concert career, and The Times wrote of one of her recitals, "Miss Evans's clear, high soprano voice was admirably suited" to the songs. The soprano's scanty documented recording career began in 1906, when she made a few cylinders for Edison Bell and began a series of vertical cut discs for Pathé. The latter included the first roughly complete recording of Gilbert and Sullivan's opera The Yeomen of the Guard, in which she sang the roles of Elsie and Kate.

This early Savoyard association would prove prophetic: on 3 January 1910, Evans replaced Nancy McIntosh in the leading role of Selene in W. S. Gilbert's unsuccessful last opera, Fallen Fairies, with music by Edward German, which Charles Workman's company had premiered on 15 December 1909 at the Savoy Theatre in London. Although Evans received favourable notices, McIntosh's dismissal provoked an acrimonious dispute among Gilbert, German, and Workman. Gilbert forbade Workman ever again to appear in one of his works in the United Kingdom, and neither Gilbert nor German would write another work for the musical stage. The Musical Times wrote:

"The part of 'Selene', the fairy queen, in the Gilbert-German opera 'Fallen Fairies' is now being played with great success by Miss Amy Evans, a young singer who has made a name on the concert and Eisteddfod platforms in Wales, but who is new to the stage. She sings a new song, the words of which are by Sir William Gilbert and the music by Edward German. This song has been the subject, first of an injunction, and then of a mysterious law suit brought by Sir William against the Savoy management. It is now restored to the performance by mutual consent." The Times noted, "She has a delicate but beautiful voice. Her high notes, both fortissimo and pianissimo are of very pure quality.... As an actress, she has a good deal to learn [but] there is... a kind of gentle sincerity that fits the part well".

After further concert appearances, she was next at the Royal Opera House in Siegfried in at the end of April 1910 playing Waldvogel. Also in 1910, Thomas Edison's National Phonograph Company issued the last documented commercial recordings by Evans, a group of four-minute cylinders.

In 1911, Evans played Princess Helena opposite Lily Elsie in a revival of A Waltz Dream at Daly's Theatre. Thereafter, she returned to her concert career, although she had brief associations with Covent Garden and the Philadelphia-Chicago Grand Opera Company in the years leading up to World War I. For example, she was Micaela in Carmen at Covent Garden in 1912, and in Chicago she joined Rosa Raisa, then at the outset of her career, as one of the flower maidens in Parsifal during the 1913–1914 season.

On 3 July 1917, Evans married Scottish baritone Fraser Gange (1886–1962). From that point forward, while Evans continued to sing solo engagements, such as her participation in the premiere of the Delius Requiem on 23 March 1922, she frequently performed together with her husband in concert, as when the couple undertook a 187-performance tour of Australia from March to December 1920 and a tour of the British provinces in 1921 and 1922. In 1922, Herman Klein from The Musical Times wrote, "Mrs. Amy Evans, Mr. Fraser Gange and Mr. Harold Samuel were heard together with the band of the Grenadier Guards under Lt G.F. Miller, at a charity concert at Queens Hall, and it is an opportunity to praise Miss Evans as one of the best of our sopranos. She allies sonorous tone with a ringing delivery and her voice is even throughout its range."

=== Later years ===
Evans and Gange continued performing together after moving to the United States in 1923 and enjoyed success in major concert venues, such as Town Hall in New York City. Indeed, within four months of their arrival in New York, the couple on 5 March 1924 sang a public joint recital there at the Lotus Club. They again toured Australia and New Zealand during a six-month period in 1928. Around that time, Evans made her last, and only electric, recordings, none released, for Columbia Records. On 27 March 1932, Evans sang in Bach's Mass in B minor with the Boston Symphony Orchestra, conducted by Serge Koussevitzky, together with Gange, Margarete Matzenauer and Richard Crooks. This was Gange's last appearance with the orchestra, with which he had formed a regular association. Evans also pursued her solo career in the United States. For instance, on 9 March 1930, she was the first woman to sing at the Harvard Club of New York City in Midtown Manhattan.

In 1949, Evans and Gange moved from New York to Baltimore, Maryland, where Gange, who by now had developed a successful academic career, taught full-time at the Peabody Conservatory. In 1975, a 91-year-old Evans gave her last documented performance, when she sang before the Welsh Women's Clubs of America, although by that time she was undoubtedly long retired.

When she died at age 98 in Baltimore, Evans was one of the last surviving cast members of a W. S. Gilbert production and possibly the last surviving player in an original run of a Gilbert production.

== Recordings ==
Few recordings of Evans are known, more than half being of duets or ensembles rather than solos. Aside from a small label's reissue of the Yeomen set described below, none has appeared on compact disc. The first Evans recordings were cylinders issued by Edison Bell as part of its Welsh series in 1906. The titles included the following:

- Y Deryn Pur
- R.S. Hughes: Llam y Cariadau
- Joseph Parry: Hywel a Blodwen (duet with John Roberts)

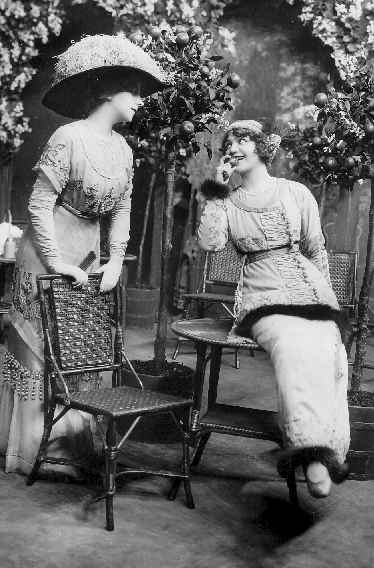
Evans and Lily Elsie in A Waltz Dream

In the same year, and carrying on into 1907, Evans recorded six individual center-start disk record sides for Pathé. The only solo was "Angels Ever Bright and Fair" from Handel's Theodora. Another recording was the trio from Gounod's Faust with tenor Alfred Heather and baritone Bantock Pierpoint. The rest were duets with baritone Francis Ludlow:

- Lionel Monckton: A Country Girl—"Boy and Girl" and The Cingalee—"You and I"
- André Messager: Véronique—"The Donkey Duet" and "Swing Song"

The second year of that association with Pathé included her participation as Elsie Maynard and Kate in the first nearly complete recording of Gilbert and Sullivan's The Yeomen of the Guard. Other cast members were Bantock Pierpoint, Ben Ivor, Francis Ludlow, and Emily Foxcroft; like Evans, all but Ivor assumed multiple roles. Substituting for the orchestra was the Band of the Scots Guards, reflecting common practise among recording companies, as technology of the day captured wind instruments far better than strings. Of six sides on which she appeared, only one featured Evans in a solo, "The Prisoner Comes", from the Act I finale.

Evans returned to the studio, and to cylinders, once more in 1910, when she recorded four solo numbers for Edison on four-minute cylinders: Thomas Moore's "The Last Rose of Summer", Guy d'Hardelot's "The Dawn", James Lyman Molloy's "The Kerry Dance", and Hermann Löhr's "I Wish I Were a Tiny Bird." No further recording sessions involving Evans are known in the acoustic era, although at some unknown time she recorded at least one cylinder for Edison in the earlier two-minute format: "Within a Mile of Edinboro Town" by James Hook.

In August and November 1926 and January 1927, Evans made recordings for Columbia using the new electric recording technology. None of them saw release. According to Evans, the masters were destroyed when the truck in which they were travelling overturned, but in approximately 2001 a private collector found three test pressings from the series. In all her earlier recordings aside from the Yeomen set, her accompaniments, as was common practice at the time, would have been by anonymous studio musicians, but information on the labels may suggest the identity of her piano accompanist in the test pressings. Each is inscribed by hand with the name Bergh, probably a reference to Arthur Bergh, then an active studio accompanist for Columbia who accompanied Fraser Gange in some of his recordings. Appropriately for the woman who would one day be the last surviving Savoyard, one song was by Arthur Sullivan, "My Dearest Heart". The other two were "A Brown Bird Singing" by Haydn Wood and "I Wonder if Love Is a Dream" by Dorothy Forster.
