= Old Sarah =

Comic opera by François Cellier and Harry Greenbank

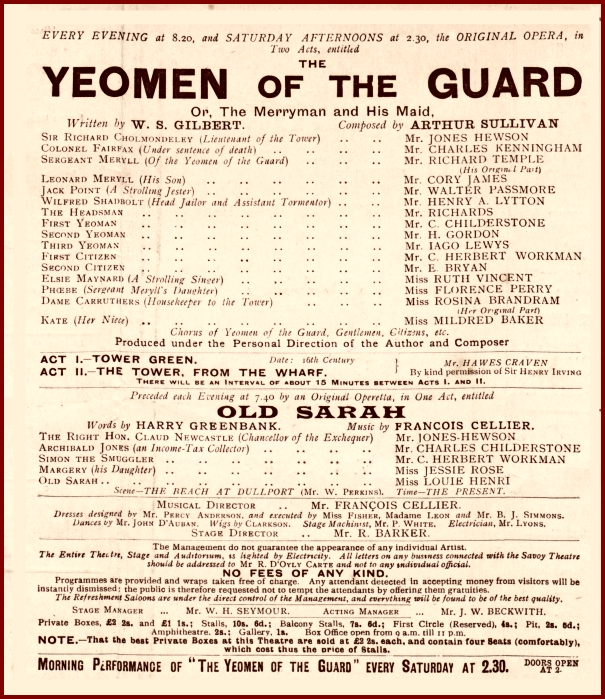
Savoy Theatre programme for the 1897 production

Old Sarah is a one-act comic opera composed by François Cellier with a libretto by Harry Greenbank.

The piece was first produced at the Savoy Theatre from 17 June to 31 July 1897 and from 16 August to 20 November 1897 as a companion piece to The Yeomen of the Guard, from 10 December 1897 to 12 March 1898 with The Grand Duchess of Gerolstein, and from 22 March to 21 May 1898 with The Gondoliers, for a total of 252 performances.

A copy of the vocal score (published in 1898 by J. Williams), but no printed libretto, is found in British Library. The score contains all the dialogue.

== Background ==
When the Gilbert and Sullivan partnership disbanded after the production of The Gondoliers in 1889, the impresario Richard D'Oyly Carte filled the Savoy Theatre with a combination of new works and revivals of the Gilbert and Sullivan operas. The fashion in the late Victorian era was to present long evenings in the theatre, and so producer Richard D'Oyly Carte preceded his Savoy operas with curtain raisers. W. J. MacQueen-Pope commented, concerning such curtain raisers:

This was a one-act play, seen only by the early comers. It would play to empty boxes, half-empty upper circle, to a gradually filling stalls and dress circle, but to an attentive, grateful and appreciative pit and gallery. Often these plays were little gems. They deserved much better treatment than they got, but those who saw them delighted in them. ... [They] served to give young actors and actresses a chance to win their spurs ... the stalls and the boxes lost much by missing the curtain-raiser, but to them dinner was more important.

To create Old Sarah, Carte selected two artists who he knew could deliver a good piece. Cellier was the long-time music director of the Savoy Theatre and had produced other works for Carte. Greenbank was also a known quantity, first for having supplied the theatre with two other curtain raisers, Captain Billy (1891) and Mr. Jericho (1893). In addition, by this time, Greenbank's reputation was well established, having supplied lyrics for a number of hit musicals, including A Gaiety Girl (1893), An Artist's Model (1895), The Geisha (1896), and The Circus Girl (1896).

== Synopsis ==
In Dullport, a dreary seaside town, out of season, Old Sarah sells sweets from a stall. She has only sold 2 ounces of acid drops and a pennyworth of mint rock in 7 weeks. Simon smuggles rum as the only way to make an "honest" living. Because nobody has any money, they all hate Archibald Jones, the income tax collector, except his sweetheart Margery (Simon's daughter). Claude Newcastle, the Chancellor of the Exchequer, arrives. By snooping around, he discovers a lot of things about people's incomes. However, when he snoops on Sarah she locks him in a bathing machine and threatens to drown him in the sea. He is, however, rescued by Archibald, forgives everybody, and all ends happily.

== Roles and original cast ==
The original cast was:

- The Rt. Hon. Claude Newcastle, Chancellor of the Exchequer – Jones Hewson
- Archibald Jones, income tax collector – Charles Childerstone
- Simon, a smuggler – Charles Herbert Workman
- Margery, his daughter – Jessie Rose
- Old Sarah – Louie Henri

Scott Russell took over from Childerstone for some of the performances
