= The Willow Pattern (opera) =

Comic opera by Basil Hood and Cecil Cook

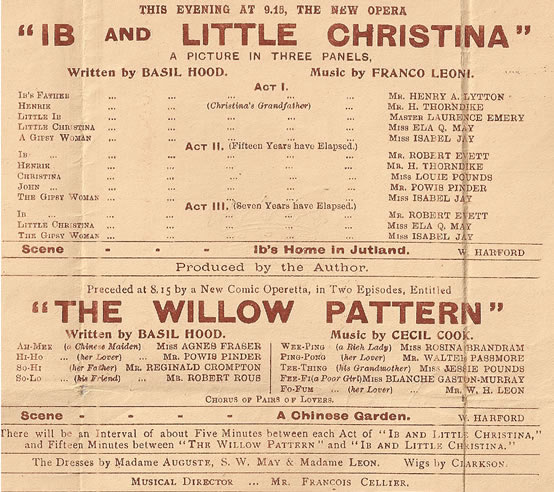
From the 1901 programme

The Willow Pattern is a one-act comic opera with a libretto by Basil Hood and music by Cecil Cook. It was first produced by William Greet at the Savoy Theatre on 14 November 1901, running for a total of 110 performances until 29 March 1902. It toured thereafter.

The Willow Pattern was a companion piece to Ib and Little Christina (for 16 performances) and later Iolanthe (94 performances). It and was toured in Britain and America. A copy of the printed libretto is in the British Library, at 11778.f.23(5). (1901). The vocal score was published by Chappells, and a copy is in British Library at F.690.j.(2) [1902].

A silent film of the legend was made in 1914, called Story of the Willow Pattern.

When the Gilbert and Sullivan partnership disbanded after the production of The Gondoliers in 1889, impresario Richard D'Oyly Carte and, after his death, his widow Helen Carte and then lessee William Greet, filled the Savoy Theatre with a combination of new works and revivals of the Gilbert and Sullivan operas. The fashion in the late Victorian era and Edwardian era was to present long evenings in the theatre, and so these Savoy operas were paired with curtain raisers, such as The Willow Pattern. W. J. MacQueen-Pope commented, concerning such curtain raisers:

This was a one-act play, seen only by the early comers. It would play to empty boxes, half-empty upper circle, to a gradually filling stalls and dress circle, but to an attentive, grateful and appreciative pit and gallery. Often these plays were little gems. They deserved much better treatment than they got, but those who saw them delighted in them. ... [They] served to give young actors and actresses a chance to win their spurs ... the stalls and the boxes lost much by missing the curtain-raiser, but to them dinner was more important.

== Synopsis ==
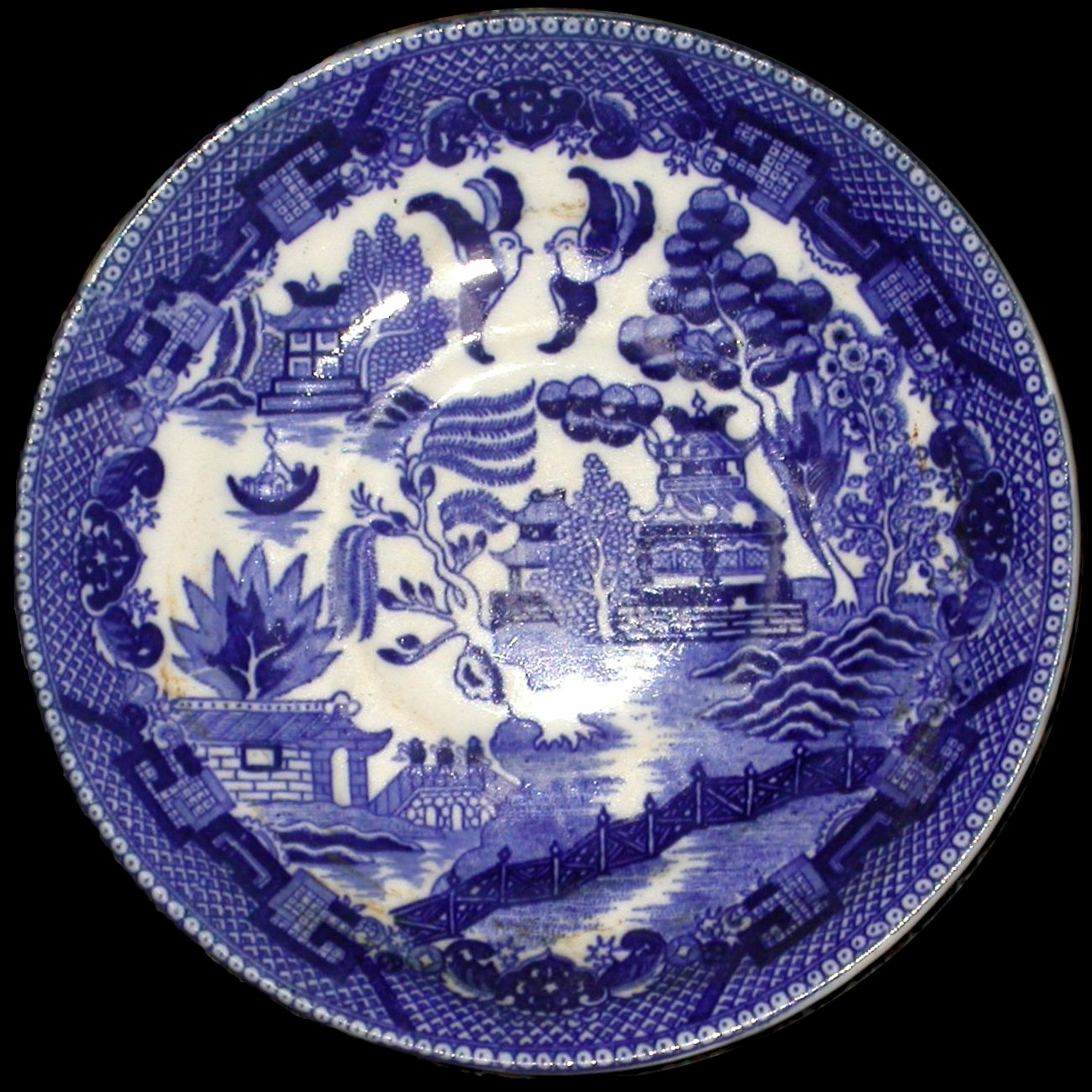
A plate with the Blue Willow pattern

The libretto follows the familiar legend of the willow pattern, but with the addition of some extra characters, notably a rogue, PingPong, who helps to trick the father into allowing his daughter to marry her lover.

The Legend of the Willow Pattern was invented by the English over 200 years ago to promote pottery sales of a china willow pattern based on an older china pattern. The story runs as follows (with the frequent references to the figures in the plate design omitted):

Once there was a wealthy mandarin, who had a beautiful daughter. She had fallen in love with a humble accountant, angering her father. He dismissed the young man and built a high fence around his house to keep the lovers apart. The Mandarin was planning for his daughter to marry a powerful Duke. The Duke arrived by boat to claim his bride, bearing a box of jewels as a gift. The wedding was to take place on the day the blossom fell from the willow tree.

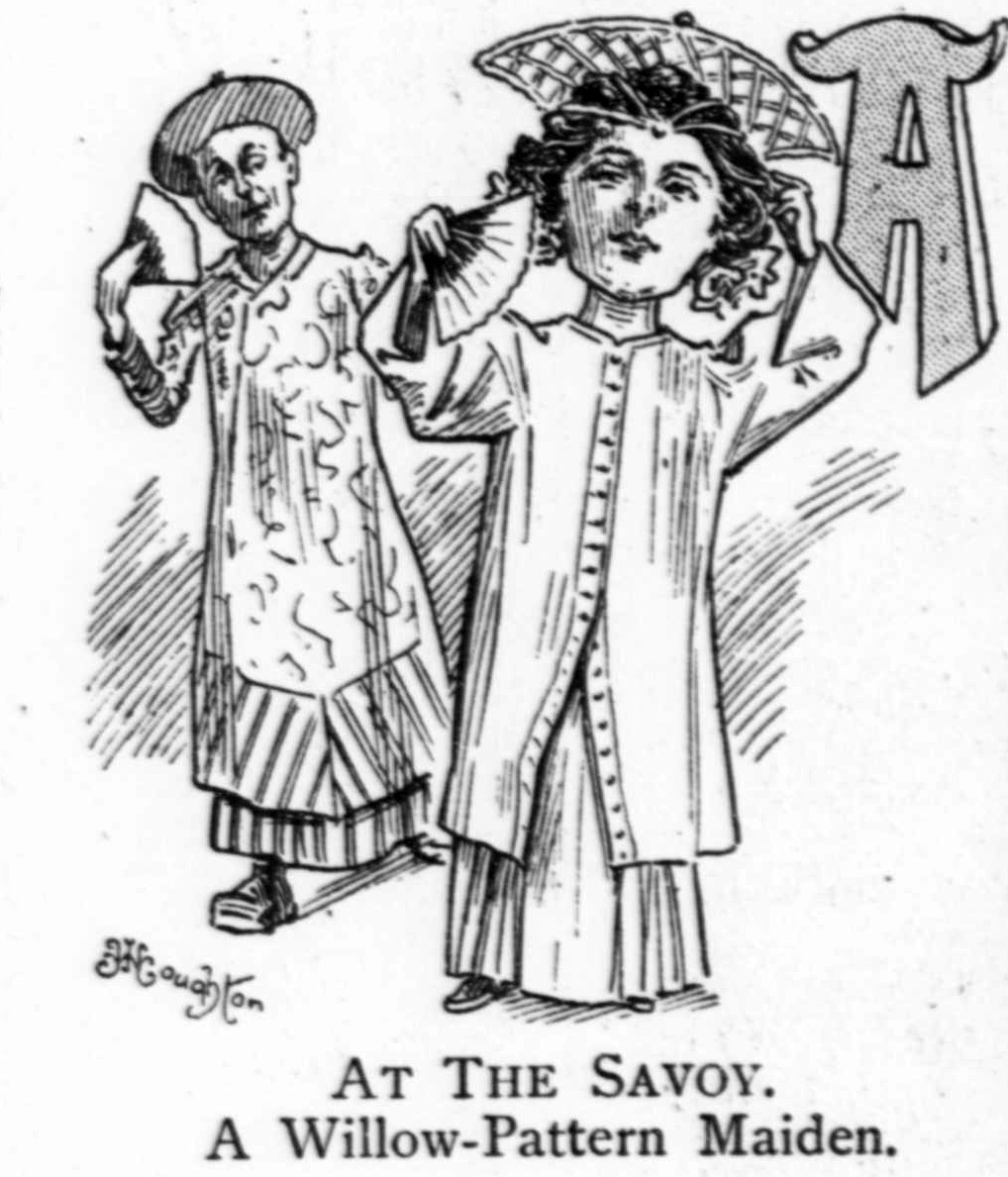
1901 drawing of a scene

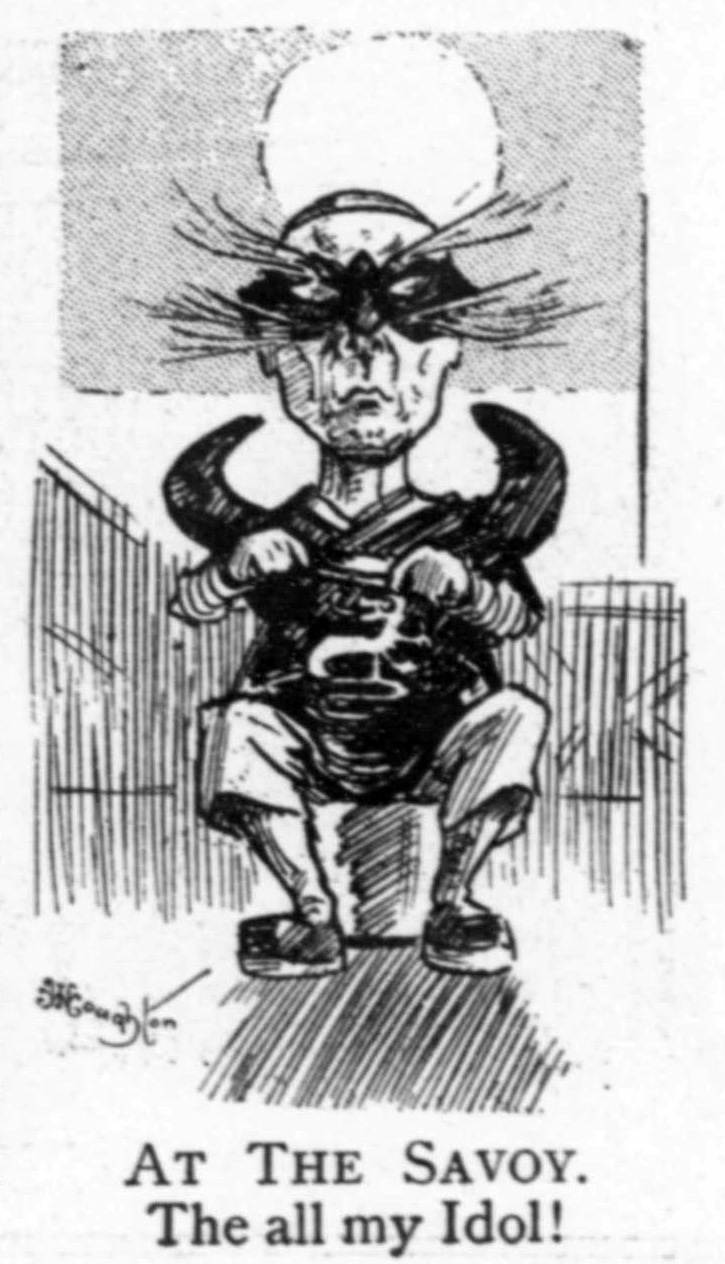
1901 drawing of a scene

On the eve of the daughter's wedding to the Duke, the young accountant, disguised as a servant, slipped into the palace unnoticed. As the lovers escaped with the jewels, the alarm was raised. They ran over a bridge, chased by the Mandarin, whip in hand. They eventually escaped to the safety of a secluded island, where they lived happily for years. But one day, the Duke learned of their refuge. Hungry for revenge, he sent soldiers, who captured the lovers and put them to death. The Gods, moved by their plight, transformed the lovers into a pair of doves.

== Roles and cast ==
- Ah Mee, a maiden. Agnes Fraser
- Hi Ho, her lover. Powis Pinder
- So Hi, her father. Reginald Crompton
- So Lo, his friend. Robert Rous
- Wee Ping, a rich lady. Rosina Brandram
- Ping Pong. Walter Passmore
- Tee Thing, his grandmother. Jessie Pounds
- Fee Fi, a poor girl. Blanche Gaston Murray
- Fo Fum, her lover. W. H. Leon

Because Ib and Little Christina was shorter than Iolanthe, The Willow Pattern was condensed when it was revived with the latter opera. The cast was reduced to the following four characters: Ah Mee, Hi Ho, So Hi (Rudolph Lewis), and Ping Pong (Robert Rous).

== Musical numbers ==
- 1. Chorus and Solos: Fee-Fi, Fo-Fum and Wee-Ping – "Comes a merry throng"
- 1a. Exit of Chorus – "Come, O merry throng"
- 2. So-Lo – "Your father in his day"
- 3. Ping-Pong – "Come, listen to a lecture"
- 4. Finale – "Join the merry throng"
- 5a. Intermezzo
- 5b. Ping-Pong – "Creepy, crawly, crawl and creep"
- 5c. Hi-Ho and Ah-Mee – "Soft as the dove"
- 6. Ah-Mee, Hi-Ho and Ping-Pong – "A thousand years ago"
- 7. Ping-Pong – "Nid-Nod, I'm a Chinese God"
- 8. Hi-Ho and Ah-Mee with Chorus – "I, like the tender turtle-dove"

Note: The vocal score credits the music of numbers 2 and 5 to Harold Vicars.
