= Mrs. Jarramie's Genie =

Comic opera by Frank Desprez, Alfred Cellier and François Cellier

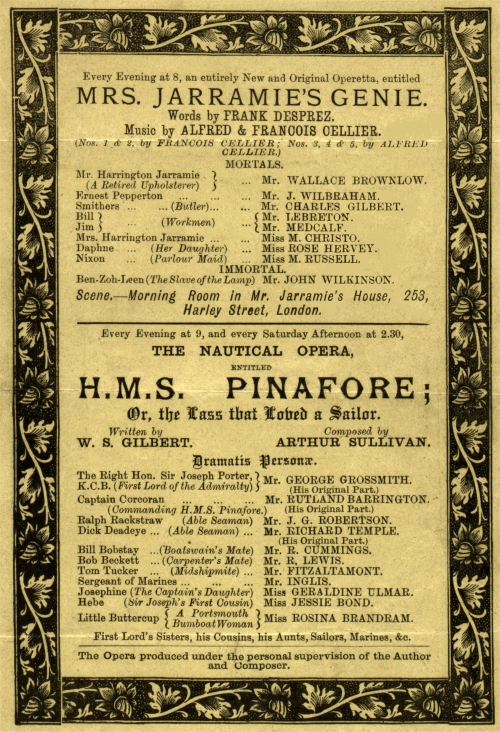
Savoy Theatre programme for the original production, 1888

Mrs. Jarramie's Genie is a one-act comic opera with a libretto by Frank Desprez and music by Alfred Cellier and François Cellier. The piece was first presented at the Savoy Theatre on 14 February 1888, as a curtain raiser to the revival of H.M.S. Pinafore (November 1887 – March 1888). It was subsequently presented as a curtain raiser to revivals of The Pirates of Penzance (March – June 1888) and The Mikado (June – September 1888), and then with The Yeomen of the Guard (October 1888 – November 1889).

No printed libretto or vocal score is found in the British Library, and no libretto is filed in the Lord Chamberlain's collection. The score and orchestra parts were apparently lost at sea in a shipwreck off the west coast of South America in 1892, and in 1910, Helen Carte, the widow of the work's producer, Richard D'Oyly Carte, gave the libretto to Desprez.

The fashion in the late Victorian era was to present long evenings in the theatre, and so producer Richard D'Oyly Carte preceded his Savoy operas with curtain raisers. W. J. MacQueen-Pope commented, concerning such curtain raisers:

This was a one-act play, seen only by the early comers. It would play to empty boxes, half-empty upper circle, to a gradually filling stalls and dress circle, but to an attentive, grateful and appreciative pit and gallery. Often these plays were little gems. They deserved much better treatment than they got, but those who saw them delighted in them. ... [They] served to give young actors and actresses a chance to win their spurs ... the stalls and the boxes lost much by missing the curtain-raiser, but to them dinner was more important.

== Setting and plot ==
The scene is the morning room of Mr. Jarramie's house, Harley Street, London.

The Era printed this summary of the plot in its review of the first performance:

Mr and Mrs Harrington Jarramie are fashionable parvenus who are elevating themselves in society by the lever of politics. Daphne, their daughter, is secretly engaged to one Ernest Pepperton, an enthusiastic young Radical, who has incurred Mr Jarramie's dislike by his unorthodox politics. Mrs Jarramie is anxious about a very particular dinner which she is going to give that day. She has, by patience and diplomacy, secured a duchess as her guest, and Elie (Mrs Jarramie) condones her butler, Smithers's, pilfering of his choice imperial Tokay in order to keep him in good humour on the great occasion. A parcel arrives containing a present from Daphne's sailor cousin, an ancient lamp which he has sent as a bit of bric-a-brac. Daphne thoughtlessly runs out to get Smithers to clean the article, and that worthy soon appears and remonstrates with his mistress on the subject, winding up by giving "notice." It seems, however, that the real cause of the resignation is that Smithers has heard that Mr Jarramie is "blackballed" for the Cerulean Club, for which he had been put up. Mrs Jarramie loses her temper, and mentions the Tokay, and the butler spitefully leaves on the instant, taking his fiancée, the cook, with him. Mrs Jarramie is in despair but rubbing the lamp angrily, the room darkens, a vast cloud of smoke fills the air and Ben-Zoh-Leen, the Slave of Aladdin's Lamp, mysteriously appears. After mutual explanations, Mrs Jarramie engages him as cook and butler combined, for by his magic power he can change in a moment from one character to the other. In the twinkling of an eye he appears in the complete dress of a chef and goes about his business. Mr Jarramie comes down, and opens his letters. His Liverpool agents have sent him a combination safe, but have not forwarded the key word by which alone it can be opened. Finding the lamp in an escritoire, he dusts it, and the Genie appears from the kitchen. Mr Jarramie promptly engages him as an electioneering canvasser, and the Slave has to make a change to the orthodox frock-coat and high hat of a politician. Mrs Jarramie's jealousy, which has accidentally been aroused by her husband's late hours, is set aflame by the perusal of a telegram to him which she opens. She mistakes the wording "Did you get safe in last night!" and the female name which serves as a key-word to the safe, for a communication from a lady; and when she finds that Mr Jarramie has taken her chef away to use him as a canvasser, she orders Ben-Zoh-Leen to take her husband to – Timbuctoo. He does so; and then Pepperton explains to Mrs Jarramie the facts of her error. Horror! Mr Jarramie must be brought back. But Mrs Jarramie has carelessly put the lamp in the combination safe, and turned the handle. Ben-Zoh-Leen cannot conscientiously obey any one not "holding" the lamp, and Mr Jarramie is in an uncomfortable position, as the Genie amicably placed him in the midst of a tribe of natives of cannibalistic propensities. After a certain amount of agony Pepperton finds the letter containing the key-word, the lamp is recovered, and Mr Jarramie restored to the bosom of his family, Pepperton pardoned, and the Genie is given his freedom, and set up in an oil and lamp business, his last service being as a bald-headed and highly respectable butler, to serve up the dinner and announce "The Duchess!" on which happy termination the curtain drops.

== Roles and original cast ==
- Mr. Harington Jarramie – Wallace Brownlow
- Ernest Pepperton – J. Wilbraham
- Smithers, the butler – Charles Gilbert
- Bill, workman – Henry le Breton
- Jim, workman – A. Medcalf
- Mrs. Harington Jarramie – Madge Christo
- Daphne, her daughter – Rose Hervey
- Nixon, parlourmaid – Miss M. Russell
- Ben-Zoh-Leen, the Slave of the Lamp – John Wilkinson

When the piece was performed with Yeomen, Brownlow was replaced by J. M. Gordon. Shortly after opening, Le Breton was replaced by Jesse Smith. In August 1889, Wilkinson was replaced by A. Medcalf and Bowden Haswell replaced Medcalf as Jim. Other substitutions occasionally took place.
