= Mabel Burnege =

English actress

- Died: July 2, 1972
- Other names: Mabel Burnage, Mabel Burnedge
- Occupations: actress, singer in musical comedies

Mabel Burnege (born about 1880 – died July 2, 1972) was an English actress in musical comedies and operettas.

== Early life ==
Burnege graduated from the Royal College of Music in London.

== Career ==
Mabel Burnege toured with the D'Oyly Carte Opera Company, performing in Gilbert and Sullivan productions, from 1903 to 1907, including a tour in South Africa. She appeared on the London stage, including roles in Bob (1903), The Mountaineers (1909), Fallen Fairies (1909), The Islander (1910), The Chocolate Soldier (1910-1911), Nightbirds (1912), The Laughing Husband (1913), and Within the Law (1913-1914).

Burnege had one Broadway credit, in The Merry Countess (1912), with an English company. She also toured North America with this show, for about a year. She was considered "an English beauty" and "very clever" by one 1913 reviewer. She was also described as the "special chum" of the star of that show, José Collins.

== Personal life ==
Mabel Burnege died in 1972, aged about 90 years.
