= The Mountaineers (opera) =

Comic opera by Guy Eden and Reginald Somerville

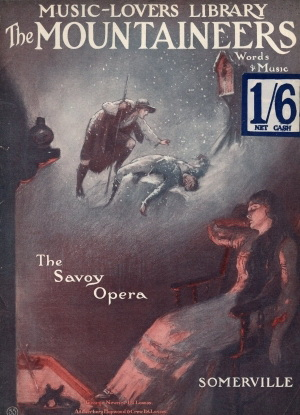
Cover of vocal selections

The Mountaineers is an English "romantic comic opera" in three acts with a libretto by Guy Eden and Reginald Somerville, lyrics by Eden and music by Somerville. The story concerns Clarice, who challenges her two suitors to retrieve an edelweiss for her from the highest peak.

The opera opened at the Savoy Theatre in London on 29 September 1909, under the management of C. H. Workman, and ran for a total of 61 performances, after some additions were made by Arthur Wimperis. It starred Workman, Elsie Spain, Claude Flemming, Jessie Rose and A. Laurence Legge. There was a provincial tour with many of the same cast, under the management of Harry P. Towers in the autumn of 1910. The second version of the opera was broadcast by the BBC on 24 March and 26 June 1924.

== Background and productions ==
Richard D'Oyly Carte died in 1901 leaving the management of the D'Oyly Carte Opera Company and the Savoy Theatre in the hands of his widow, Helen. After a successful repertory season at the Savoy ending in March 1909, the now-frail Helen leased the theatre to actor Charles H. Workman, who had been a long-time principal performer with the D'Oyly Carte Opera Company. Encouraged by the success of the Gilbert and Sullivan repertory seasons, Workman decided to produce his own season of light opera. He continued the run of The Yeomen of the Guard until the end of March and then closed the theatre until he had a new work ready.

Somerville is credited with the conception of The Mountaineers. He was travelling in a train through the Rhine Valley when the idea came to him: "I had been glancing idly at a guide book, but the opening lines of a quaint legendary tale relating to some little village in the mountains suddenly held my interest, and when I had read it through I realised that here was the ideal story for an opera. Only the climax would have to be altered, for the story ended on a tragic note." Somerville showed The Mountaineers to Workman, who was at once interested. He assembled several financial backers and formed the Comic Opera Syndicate. The press referred to the work as a Savoy opera.

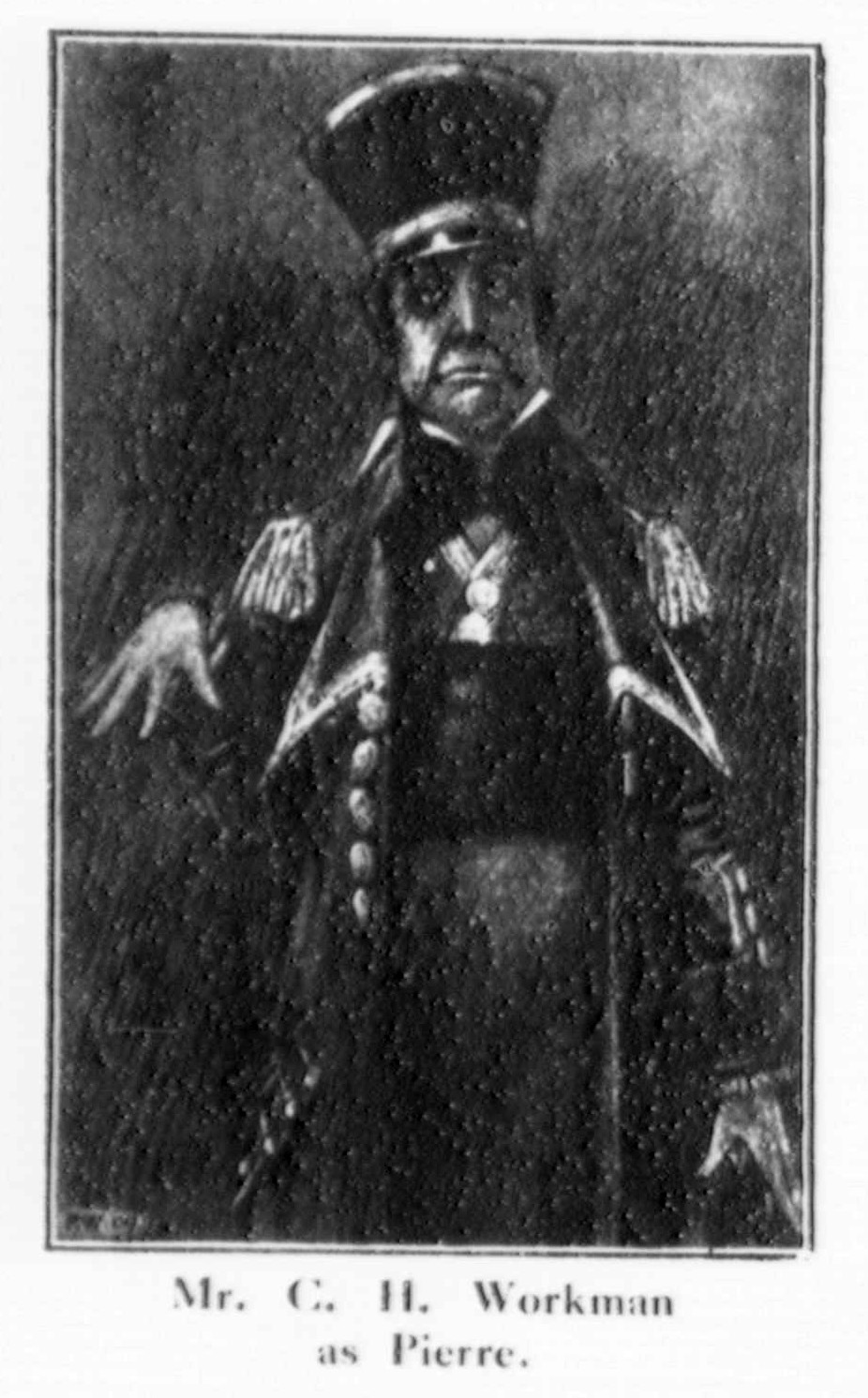
1909 caricature of C. H. Workman in The Mountaineers

The Mountaineers opened on 29 September 1909 at the Savoy Theatre, to a very enthusiastic audience. Critical response was mixed, however, with most critics finding the piece light, pleasant and entertaining, in an old-fashioned way. The Times declared that "it forms one of those instances of respectable mediocrity which are more difficult to describe than many far less meritorious works. This does not mean that it is dull, or 'not worth going to see.' On the contrary, it provides a very pleasant, pretty, amusing entertainment. ... A good story, well told; but told without wit, without distinction." The Manchester Guardian found both the story and music "simple and charming" but felt that the subject was not "strong enough to occupy a whole evening" and did not think that Workman's part in the piece was convincing. The Musical Times called Somerville's music "graceful, melodious and, like the libretto, always refined"; it praised the comedy of Workman and the singing of Spain, Flemming, Legge and Rose.

The authors quickly reacted to the critique, hiring Arthur Wimperis, the lyricist of The Arcadians, to brighten up the piece. Five new songs were added, as well as a duelling scene between Pierre and Gustave in the second act, and additional comic dialogue. The show contained songs that satirised the Chancellor of the Exchequer, David Lloyd George, which did not deter Lloyd George from attending a performance in November 1909. On the evening of the performance, the theatre was picketed by suffragettes demonstrating against the government in general and Lloyd George in particular. The performance was interrupted by demonstrations in the theatre by suffragettes in the audience who had been organised by the Women's Social and Political Union; the demonstrators were expelled forcibly. When one woman claimed property that had been left behind during the expulsion, Workman complained to Christabel Pankhurst, the leader of the Women's Social and Political Union, about the damage her members had caused.

The Mountaineers closed on 27 November after 61 performances, making way for Fallen Fairies, which needed to be rehearsed on the stage of the Savoy for an opening before Christmas. Fallen Fairies, by W. S. Gilbert and Edward German was unsuccessful despite the cachet of W. S. Gilbert as librettist. After this disappointment, Workman decided to follow the prevailing tastes of the London public by presenting an Edwardian musical comedy for his third production, Two Merry Monarchs, but this also failed to catch on.

The Mountaineers toured in the British provinces with many of the same cast, under management of Harry P. Towers (with Marie Dainton as Clarice), in the autumn of 1910. A production of a Spanish translation of the opera was presented in Barcelona in early 1910. The second version of the opera was broadcast by the BBC on 24 March and 26 June 1924, produced and conducted by L. Stanton Jefferies.

== Synopsis ==
Act I – An Alpine frontier village

It is Market Day, and the villagers go about their daily business. Today is the twentieth birthday of Clarice, the daughter of the comical Pierre, who is head of the Douane. Clarice is courted by two men: Conrad, a rich man from the city, and Fritz, a rugged mountaineer. The diligence arrives with the passengers, and Pierre informs his guests that his men must search their luggage for contraband. He meets Miss Spinifiex, a travelling English spinster, and discovers that she is quite wealthy. He invites her to make a stay with him in the hopes that he might acquire her diamonds. Clarice is unable to decide which of her suitors she prefers, so she reminds them of a local legend. The village coquette Annette says: "no right-minded girl in our village will listen to a man's suit until he has shewn his pluck by bringing her a sprig of Edelweiss from the highest peak yonder." Conrad and Fritz agree to go at once and seek out the flower, but Pierre begs them not to go, for a snowstorm is coming.

Act II – The interior of Pierre's chalet

It is evening, and Pierre's guests dance a mazurka. Pierre introduces Miss Spinifex to them, but when she meets Gustave, one of his subordinates, he becomes quite jealous. Annette has a slight romantic interest in Gustave, and she is equally jealous, so to exact revenge, Annette and Pierre agree to flirt with one another. Fritz has disguised himself as an organ grinder, seeking shelter from the blizzard, and when he meets Clarice, he offers to read her fortune. Her fortune is that she loves two men, but prefers the mountaineer. She declines to confirm his reading. Pierre catches Fritz and orders him to go to the mountain at once, find Conrad and bring him back alive for Clarice's sake.

A new guest, Sergeant Frederico, arrives at the chalet. There is a rumour of immediate war with a neighbouring power, and he is hastening to the front. The reserves will shortly be called up. Pierre and Annette's plan has worked perfectly, and their respective love interests return to them. Clarice admits that she loves Fritz and wishes he would return. She falls asleep before the fireplace and has a vision of a spot high in the mountains with a shrine, before which a red light burns. Conrad lies insensible in the snow. He is discovered by Fritz, who reluctantly rescues Conrad. The dream ended, Clarice wakes to hear that Conrad is safe and sound, tucked up in bed. Fritz has brought him back alive, and Clarice begs Fritz's forgiveness.

Act III – The village

Several weeks later, it is the wedding day of Clarice and Fritz. Annette and Gustave agree to get married before he grows to love her again. She has received a letter from Sergeant Frederico, who will come today to announce the names of those called to the front. Pierre gives a paper edelweiss to Miss Spinifex, inventing a grand story of how he retrieved the flower for her. She agrees to marry him at once. The Sergeant and the soldiers appear, and they are met by Conrad. It is revealed that only one man in the village has been summoned for active duty: Fritz. Conrad tries to bribe the Sergeant into forgetting Fritz. The wedding party appears, returning from the wedding, and the Sergeant delivers the unhappy news. Fritz bids farewell to Clarice and his friends, but Conrad steps forward and offers to be Fritz' substitute in the marching line. Clarice shows her gratitude and a gun is handed to Conrad as he prepares to march away to war.

== Roles and original cast ==
Flemming and Spain

- Pierre, a Custom House official (baritone) – C. H. Workman
- Fritz, a mountaineer (baritone) – Claude Flemming
- Conrad, a rich man from the city (tenor) – A. Laurence Legge
- Gustave, a Custom House official – Reginald Lawrence
- Louis, a Custom House employee – A. Welton Fordham
- Francois, a Custom House employee (baritone) – Sydney Ashcroft
- Sgt. Frederico (bass) – Frank Perfitt
- A Priest – A. Everett
- A Citizen – D. Fergusson
- Clarice, daughter of Pierre (soprano) – Elsie Spain
- Annette, the village coquette (mezzo-soprano) – Jessie Rose
- Miss Spinifex, a travelling English spinster (contralto) – Kate Forster
- Village girls: Yvonne, Armandine, Celestine, Noelie and Yvette - Ruby Gray, Mabel Burnege, Gladys Lancaster, Hilda Vining and Josset Legh
- Prudence, maid to Miss Spinifex – Marjorie Dawes
- Bridesmaids – Fay Temple, Giovanna Botto
- Chorus of villagers, passengers, soldiers and Custom House men

== Musical numbers ==
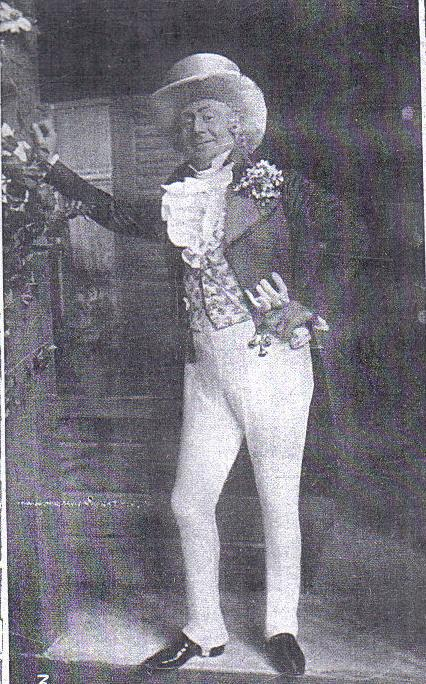
Workman as Pierre

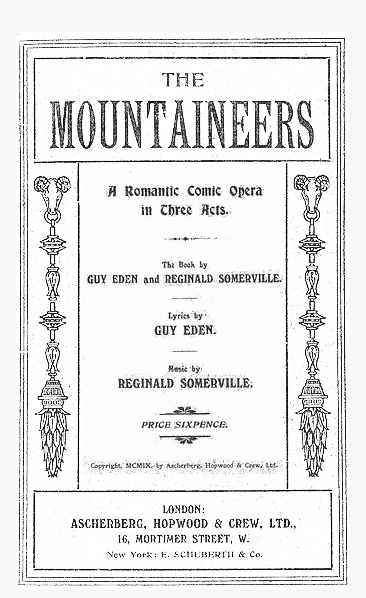
Cover of vocal score

- Introduction

Act I

- No. 1. "Hither again on our market day" (Yvonne, Villagers and Custom House Men)
- No. 2. "Many happy returns of the day" (Chorus and Clarice)
- No. 3. "Was it the sigh of a passing soul?" (Conrad)
- No. 4. "Like the summer lightning flashing o'er the plain" (Clarice and Conrad)
- No. 5. "Travelling" (Pierre and Custom House Men)
- No. 6. "Once again the merry jingle" (Market People, Villagers and Custom House Men)
- No. 7. "If you'll tarry in this valley" (Pierre and Miss Spinifex)
- No. 8. "Doubting" (Fritz)
- No. 9. "It is really most disarming" (Pierre, Clarice, Fritz and Conrad)
- No. 10. "The Legend of the Edelweiss" (Clarice)
- No. 11. Act 1 Finale: "Fair maiden, at your word" (Ensemble)

Act II

- Entr'acte
- No. 12. Mazurka "Trip we now our dainty measure" (Chorus)
- No. 13. "For fury and strife" (Pierre and Annette)
- No. 14. "Just let me hold your little hand" (Fritz and Clarice)
- No. 15. "An old man sat in the twilight gloom" (Pierre)
- No. 16. "What man is this... A well-filled pipe" (Sergeant Frederico and Chorus)
- No. 17. "I should like here to state" (Annette)
- No. 18. "The hour is fleeting and we must away" (Pierre, Miss Spinifex and Chorus)
- No. 19. "Bright were the fairy dreams" (Clarice)
- No. 19a. Pantomime Dream Music
- No. 20. Act 2 Finale:

"What a hurry, what a flurry" (Chorus, Clarice, Pierre and Fritz)
"Forgiveness grant and pity show" (Clarice and Fritz)
"Hero, we name you man of pluck and daring!" (Chorus)

Act III

- No. 21. "Happy the couple on whom the sun pours his rays" (Francois, Villagers and Custom House Men)
- No. 22. "Although my hair is grey" (Pierre and Chorus)
- No. 23. "The ship and the wind" (Annette)
- No. 24. "This morning I woke with the dawn" (Pierre and Miss Spinifex)
- No. 25. "Is the love dead?" (Conrad)
- No. 26. "With beating heart and downcast eyes" (Chorus and Bridesmaids)
- No. 27. "We're the humbler sort of men" (Sergeant Frederico and Soldiers)
- No. 28. "Now the deed is done" (Chorus)
- No. 29. "Now I must leave thee, beloved" (Fritz, Clarice, Annette, Miss Spinifex, Pierre and Chorus)
- No. 30. Act 3 Finale: "To arms, to arms! My comrades" (Ensemble)

Songs added during the original run:

- "When I manage the Exchequer" (Pierre and Chorus)
- "On the shelf" (Annette)
- "I'm so glad that you decide" (Annette, Miss Spinifex, Gustave, Pierre, Sergeant)
- "The breezes sing low 'mid the roses" (Clarice and Chorus)
- "All hail the bride!" (Bridal Chorus)
