= Pretty Polly (play) =

Pretty Polly is a one-act playlet by Basil Hood, with music composed by François Cellier. The ten-minute long piece concerns the difficulties of a shy fellow who tries to use a talking parrot as a matrimonial agent.

The piece was first produced at the Theatre Royal, Colchester, 26 April 1900, and then at the Savoy Theatre, from 19 May 1900 to 28 June 1900 as a companion piece to Hood and Sir Arthur Sullivan's The Rose of Persia, a run of 26 performances. It then played from 8 December 1900 to 20 April 1901, together with the first revival of Gilbert and Sullivan's 1881 hit, Patience, a run of 102 performances.

No printed libretto or vocal score is found in British Library, although the licence copy of the libretto is there. The music appears to have been added for the Savoy Theatre production, as it is not indicated in the licence copy.

== Background ==
When the Gilbert and Sullivan partnership disbanded after the production of The Gondoliers in 1889, impresario Richard D'Oyly Carte filled the Savoy Theatre with a combination of new works (several of which were composed by Arthur Sullivan) and revivals of the Gilbert and Sullivan operas. The fashion in the late Victorian era was to present long evenings in the theatre, and so producer Richard D'Oyly Carte preceded his Savoy operas with curtain raisers. W. J. MacQueen-Pope commented, concerning such curtain raisers:

This was a one-act play, seen only by the early comers. It would play to empty boxes, half-empty upper circle, to a gradually filling stalls and dress circle, but to an attentive, grateful and appreciative pit and gallery. Often these plays were little gems. They deserved much better treatment than they got, but those who saw them delighted in them. ... [They] served to give young actors and actresses a chance to win their spurs ... the stalls and the boxes lost much by missing the curtain-raiser, but to them dinner was more important.

The creators of Pretty Polly were two artists who Carte knew could deliver a good piece. Hood was also the librettist for the main item on the bill, The Rose of Persia, and Cellier was the long-time music director of the Savoy Theatre and had produced other works for Carte. The little curtain raiser was warmly received. The Pall Mall Gazette wrote: "Pretty Polly, which preceded The Rose of Persia for the first time on Saturday night, is a little duologue by Mr. Basil Hood, which almost reconciles one to the curtain-raiser superfluity. If such things must be, this one is a model; only about ten minutes, and each one of them full of hearty laughter. Miss Louie Pounds is very charming in her part, and Mr. Henry Lytton acquits himself well in his; while a special word is due for the voice behind the scenes which talks for the live parrot on the stage."

Sir Arthur Sullivan died shortly before the opening of the revival of Pretty Polly, and both Richard D'Oyly Carte and Queen Victoria died during the revival. As a mark of respect, the Savoy Theatre was kept dark for a period of time after each of these sad events.

== Synopsis ==
A good-hearted young man, Charlie Brown, has been abroad for some time. He wants to propose to pretty Polly Grey, but he is shy. He brings a talking parrot to her apartment to say the words "Pretty Polly! I wonder if she ever thinks of me!", which he hopes will "break the ice" for him, but he hides the parrot until he can determine whether or not she likes parrots. The lady sees the parrot and overhears his planning. She mischievously plays hard-to-get, claiming to hate parrots, but she happily accepts a bouquet of flowers from Brown (although the flowers had actually been sent by a rival, Percy Green). Brown hopes to sneak out without letting her know that he has brought the parrot, but Polly gives him a large dose of quinine to drink (as he had tried to excuse himself on account of tropical fever) and begs him to tell of his travels.

Just then the bird squawks out "Pretty Polly!" and Brown tries to cover again, saying that he has learnt the skill of ventriloquism in India. As Brown tries to put the parrot's cage outside the window surreptitiously, Polly "notices" the parrot. Brown, thinking quickly, ties Percy Green's card to the cage and says that the parrot must have come from Mr Green. Polly exclaims that poor Freen must have sent it to her "to break the ice for him! What a clever idea!" Gathering his courage, Brown makes the following speech:

Before I leave you for South Africa I must tell you as an honourable man that I have misled you. That is my parrot. Mr Percy Green’s card was tied to it by - by mistake. The voice you heard was not my voice, but my parrot's. The bird can talk, and I wanted it to say something which I was too shy to say myself. I meant it to break the ice for me. The clever idea was mine, not Mr Percy Green’s. Farewell!

Polly then asks what else he taught the bird to say. Brown replies, "I wonder if she ever thinks of me!". Polly admits that the answer is "Yes". As Brown happily moves to kiss his pretty tormenter, she stops him: "One moment!" she covers up the parrot. "Parrots talk, you know!" They kiss.

== Cast information ==
The first Savoy Theatre cast was:

- Charlie Brown – Henry Lytton (who also played the Sultan in The Rose of Persia)
- Polly Grey – Louie Pounds

From December 1900, the cast was:

- Charlie Brown – Robert Evett (who also played the Duke of Dunstable in Patience)
- Polly Grey – Louie Pounds
