= Reginald Somerville =

English composer and actor

Reginald Somerville (1867 – 8 July 1948) was an English composer and actor. He is known for writing many drawing-room ballads such as "God Sends the Night", "Yestereve", "Zaida: A Song of the Desert" and "The Lark and the Nightingale", as well as a handful of operas.

== Biography ==
Somerville received musical training under the Italian tenor and teacher Giulio Moretti. He co-wrote music with A. McLean and G. W. Byng for the musical farce, A White Silk Dress, opening at London's Prince of Wales's Theatre on 3 October 1896. In collaboration with the librettist Guy Eden he wrote The 'Prentice Pillar, a romantic opera in one act in 1899. Somerville's "The Ballad of Thyra Lee", a dramatic scene, premiered in 1900, was given at a Royal Philharmonic Society concert in May 1903. Also 1903, he played opposite Marie Studholme in The School Girl. In 1909, his opera The Mountaineers was premiered at the Savoy Theatre in London. It had a two-month run and a provincial tour in late 1910.

After the First World War, Somerville wrote Antoine, an opera that he considered his best work, which was produced at the Lyceum Theatre, London, by the Carl Rosa Opera Company. The plot of the opera featured a blind sailor who has his sight miraculously restored only to discover his wife eloping with a rich lover. He also wrote both the music and lyrics for a three-act opera titled David Garrick, which was founded on T. W. Robertson's well-known comedy of the same name. It was premiered in 1920 by the Carl Rosa company and then presented under Somerville's management in the West End, substantially re-written to suit the light-music audience. Critics were divided on the merit of Somerville's music. The Illustrated London News remarked that the score "halts between the methods of the lyric and the grand-opera stage, and would have been all the better for cutting out all the connections with the latter." A week later, the critic continued, "He has no great gift of melody. ... Worse than the orchestration is the handling of the ensembles, if one may call them ensembles." The work was revived in 1932. In 1924, he wrote The Love Doctor, a "musical show with a story", which was toured on the Moss' Empires circuit and played in London at the Chelsea Palace Theatre in 1925.

Somerville's work as a composer dried up with the advent of sound films in the mid-1920s, and he took to teaching, but he became ill, ran into debt and was declared bankrupt in 1934. The bankruptcy was discharged in 1937.

He died on 8 July 1948 at St John's nursing home, Tankerton-on-Sea, in Kent.

== Instrumental works and songs ==
Somerville's published works for piano include: "Alpine Roses – Morceau" (1913); "Automobile waltz" (1912); "Carina – Morceau pizzicato pour Piano" (1911); "The Honey Bee – Humoresque for the piano" (1924); "Intermezzo" (1922); "The Mountaineers – Pianoforte Selection" (1913); "Three Dances" (1922); and "Three Light Pieces for Piano: Bagatelle, Melody, and Valse" (1911). Among his orchestral works are "Four Fancies – Suite" (1925); "Funeral of a Flea" (1928); "Nucleus Themes, No. 1" (1927); "Razzle-Dazzle" (1928); and "Two Grotesque Recitations (1927)".

Songs by Somerville include: "All the Way to Coventry" (1913); "Call the yowes to the knowes" (1891); "God Sends the Night" (1908); "The Hour I love the best of all" (1924); "The Lark and the Nightingale" (1900); "The Laughing Waves" (1900); "A Memory" (1891); "The Song of Kent" (1921); "Songs of Friendship" (1909); "The Amber Necklace" (1917); "When Dreams come true" (1913); "Wherever I may be" (1913); "Who Rides for the King" (1911); and "Zaïda" (1914).
