= The Navy (London) =

The Navy was a magazine published by the Navy League of Great Britain from 1909 until 1971.
