= François Cellier =

English conductor and composer (1849–1914)

Cellier, by Ellis and Walery, c.1890

François Arsène Cellier (14 December 1849 – 5 January 1914), often called Frank, was an English conductor and composer. He is known for his tenure as musical director and conductor of the D'Oyly Carte Opera Company during the original runs and early revivals of the Savoy operas.

Succeeding his elder brother Alfred as the company's chief conductor in 1878, Cellier devoted almost all the rest of his life to comic opera. He was musical director for the original runs of nine Gilbert and Sullivan operas and fourteen full-length pieces by other writers at the Savoy Theatre between 1881 and 1902. He composed songs and also some short curtain raisers that were well received but have rarely been revived.

== Life and career ==
=== Early years ===
Cellier was born in South Hackney, London, the youngest of the five children of Arsène Cellier, a language teacher from France, and his wife Mary Ann Peterine, formerly Peacock, née Thomsett. He followed his eldest brother Alfred as a chorister at the Chapel Royal, St James's. Like his brother, and the latter's fellow pupil Arthur Sullivan, François benefited from the tutelage of the Rev Thomas Helmore, who ensured that the choristers received an all-round education in addition to their musical training.

Leaving the choir school at the age of seventeen, Cellier held a series of posts as an organist, first in Belfast, Ireland, and then at the church of St John of Jerusalem, South Hackney, where he had been christened, and in 1870 St Michael's, Lower Sydenham. After a spell as Sullivan's deputy organist at St Peter's, Cranley Gardens, South Kensington, he moved to St Anne's, Surbiton, where he remained for the rest of his career, in tandem with his theatrical conducting work.

Cellier married Clara Short in 1873. They had five daughters and a son, François, who became an actor under the name of Frank Cellier and was the father of the actor Peter Cellier.

=== Conductor and musical director ===
In July 1878 Cellier succeeded his brother Alfred as the conductor of Gilbert and Sullivan's H.M.S. Pinafore during its long run at the Opera Comique, London. He remained as the company's musical director there and, from 1881, at the Savoy Theatre, until 1902, with a break between July 1880 and April 1881, when his brother temporarily resumed the position. The composer conducted at first nights, but Cellier, as musical director, was the principal conductor for the original runs of Patience (1881–82), Iolanthe (1882–84), Princess Ida (1884), The Mikado (1885–87), Ruddigore (1887), The Yeomen of the Guard (1888–89), The Gondoliers (1889–91), Utopia, Limited (1893–94) and The Grand Duke (1896). As the Savoy's musical director he conducted the London runs of fourteen operas by other authors or composers between 1891 and 1902, fourteen revivals of Gilbert and Sullivan works, beginning with The Sorcerer in 1884 and ending with Iolanthe in 1901, and a similar number of curtain-raisers and afterpieces. He was appointed musical-director-in-chief at Richard D'Oyly Carte's Royal English Opera House for the runs of Sullivan's Ivanhoe and Messager's La Basoche in 1891–92.

In the 1890s Cellier began conducting D'Oyly Carte Opera Company productions outside London. In 1890 he took charge of the first provincial performances of The Gondoliers, and in 1894 he conducted a touring company presenting Princess Ida and Utopia, Limited. In 1902–03 he led a D'Oyly Carte tour of South Africa, conducting six Gilbert and Sullivan operas and The Rose of Persia. He briefly left D'Oyly Carte on his return to England in June 1903. During that month he conducted a one-off matinée performance of his new operetta, Bob (libretto by Cunningham Bridgman, the manager of a D'Oyly Carte touring company) at the Adelphi Theatre. The piece had been premiered in Walsall in April while he was still in Africa. Bob was also played by D'Oyly Carte touring companies in 1903–04. In December 1904 Cellier conducted a short-lived comic opera, Ladyland, by Eustace Ponsonby and Frank Lambert at the Avenue Theatre. In July 1905 he rejoined the D'Oyly Carte company, until retiring, in 1913, as musical director of the touring repertory company and, at the Savoy, conducting the London repertory seasons of Gilbert and Sullivan operas in 1906–07 and 1908–09.

=== Composer, orchestrator and author ===
Part of a programme showing Cellier's Old Sarah preceding a revival of The Yeomen of the Guard at the Savoy Theatre, 1897

In addition to Bob, which never played at the Savoy Theatre, Cellier composed music for several companion pieces that played together with the Savoy Operas (and often also on tour), including Mrs. Jarramie's Genie (1888, composed jointly with his brother Alfred, libretto by Frank Desprez), Captain Billy (1891, libretto by Harry Greenbank), Old Sarah (1897, libretto by Greenbank), and Pretty Polly (1900, libretto by Basil Hood). These short pieces have rarely been revived professionally, but they were popular with amateur groups in the early years of the 20th century.

For the Children's Pinafore in 1879–80 and the Children's Pirates in 1884, Cellier transposed the song keys to fit each individual child's voice. The choruses, especially the string parts, were rearranged so that the children's voices could be heard, and orchestral accompaniment was provided for the normally unaccompanied numbers for the support of the young male voices.

The theatrical newspaper The Era commented that although his other commitments left him short of time for composition, as a songwriter Cellier was "very favourably known". His published songs in the catalogue of the British Library are: "From Dawn to Dawn" (words by R. J. Martin, 1898); "Sad 'tis to Part" (words by W. S. Beadle, 1889); "The Polo Song" (words by "Marksman", 1901); "No Fear!" (words by R. J. Martin, 1903); and four songs with words by Bridgeman: "Coquet and Coy" (1887); "Hampton Courtship" (1887); "'Tis For the Best" (1888); and "Men of the Day" (1888). His short anthem, "Holy, Holy, Holy" was published in 1901.

Cellier devoted his brief retirement to writing a book of reminiscences about Gilbert, Sullivan and the D'Oyly Carte Opera Company (Gilbert and Sullivan and Their Operas). He died at his home in Kingston upon Thames in 1914 before the book was completed, and his collaborator, Bridgeman, completed and published it later that year.

== Reputation ==
Henry Lytton wrote:

Cellier had his heart and soul in every performance, and what that means is known only to those who work on the stage, and who do sometimes become dull and listless because of their very familiarity with the parts they are playing or because the audience cannot easily be aroused to 'concert pitch'. ... It is at just such times as these that a real conductor is worth his weight in gold. Notwithstanding that he may have seen the piece hundreds of times – and might with reason be more bored than the principals themselves – he comes to each new performance with an enthusiasm which shakes the company out of themselves and makes everything go with a will.

Cellier's collaborator Bridgeman wrote of his friend's dedication to the music of Arthur Sullivan and Alfred Cellier, to the exclusion, Bridgeman felt, of all other music. Sullivan willed to Cellier the original manuscript scores for The Pirates of Penzance and Patience. Bridgeman, and the anonymous author of The Era's profile, considered, as Lytton did, that Cellier's natural talent could have equipped him to rival the creative success of at least one of his two musical idols, but that indolence and lack of ambition prevented it. Both those sources agree that Cellier's conducting technique was unshowy and strictly practical, and he took pleasure in being known as "the musician who conducts in English".
