= Fallen Fairies =

Comic opera by W. S. Gilbert and Edward German

Scenes and characters in Fallen Fairies

Fallen Fairies; or, The Wicked World, is a two-act comic opera, with a libretto by W. S. Gilbert and music by Edward German. The story is an operatic adaptation of Gilbert's 1873 blank-verse fairy comedy, The Wicked World. In Fairyland, the fairies are curious about wicked mortals, especially their strange capacity for love. They summon three mortal men from the world below to observe them and to teach the men how to live virtuously. The fairies fall in love with the mortals, become jealous of each other and behave badly. The men return to Earth, and the fairies realize that love is overrated.

The piece premiered at London's Savoy Theatre on 15 December 1909. Gilbert directed the opera. Charles Herbert Workman produced and starred as Lutin. The cast also starred Gilbert protégée Nancy McIntosh as Selene, the Fairy Queen. McIntosh received negative reviews, and Workman soon replaced her with Amy Evans and made changes in the play that angered Gilbert, who sued Workman. Despite better reviews for Evans, the work did not please the critics, or ultimately the audiences. It failed, closing after just 50 performances. Neither Gilbert nor German would write another opera.

== Background ==
Early in his career, Gilbert wrote a number of successful blank-verse fairy comedies. He was clearly fascinated by this plot, which had been the subject of his 1871 short story of the same name before writing The Wicked World in 1873. He also wrote (under a pseudonym) an 1873 play that parodies The Wicked World called The Happy Land, and contained much political satire aimed at politicians of the day; this made a sensation at the Court Theatre after the Lord Chamberlain banned parts of it.

Like a number of Gilbert's blank-verse plays, Fallen Fairies treats the ensuing consequences when an all-female world is disrupted by men and the romantic complications they bring. His plays The Princess (1870) and Broken Hearts (1875), and his earlier operas Iolanthe (1882) and Princess Ida (1884), are all treatments of this basic idea. Stedman calls this a "Gilbertian invasion plot". Princess Ida and Fallen Fairies, both based on earlier blank-verse plays by Gilbert, unlike Gilbert's other operas, both retain blank verse in the dialogue.

== Creation and production ==
An operatic version of The Wicked World had been on Gilbert's mind for some time. As early as 1897, he had suggested the idea to Helen Carte, the wife and partner of Richard D'Oyly Carte. Arthur Sullivan, André Messager, Jules Massenet, Liza Lehmann and Alexander Mackenzie, to whom he offered it in turn, all objected to the absence of a male chorus. Edward Elgar also turned it down, but did not say why. Gilbert finally found a willing collaborator in Edward German.

Gilbert, Workman and German at a rehearsal

Charles Herbert Workman, who had made a name playing the comic baritone parts in the Gilbert and Sullivan operas, assembled a production syndicate in 1909 to produce comic operas (starring himself) at the Savoy Theatre, beginning with The Mountaineers, followed by Fallen Fairies, in which he appeared in the comic role of Lutin. The piece opened on 15 December 1909, and the cast also starred Leo Sheffield as Phyllon, Percy Anderson designed the costumes. John D'Auban choreographed. Had Fallen Fairies been a success, it was intended that Gilbert would revive (with revisions) earlier operas of his that were not in the D'Oyly Carte Opera Company repertoire, and that it would be followed by at least one more new work by Gilbert and German.

With German's agreement, Gilbert cast his protégée Nancy McIntosh as the Fairy Queen, Selene. McIntosh's vocal powers were not what they had been a decade earlier, and critics found her performance weak, saying that she was "too much a tragedy queen" for the romantic role. On 3 January 1910, Workman's syndicate replaced McIntosh with Amy Evans and demanded the restoration of a song that Gilbert had cut during rehearsals. Gilbert was outraged and sued Workman and the syndicate, but German declined to join him, dismayed by the dispute. Gilbert angrily banned Workman from ever performing in his operas in the United Kingdom. The Musical Times wrote:

"The part of 'Selene', the fairy queen, in the Gilbert-German opera 'Fallen Fairies' is now being played with great success by Miss Amy Evans, a young singer who has made a name on the concert and Eisteddfod platforms in Wales, but who is new to the stage. She sings a new song, the words of which are by Sir William Gilbert and the music by Edward German. This song has been the subject, first of an injunction, and then of a mysterious law suit brought by Sir William against the Savoy management. It is now restored to the performance by mutual consent."

The replacement of the leading lady was not enough to save Fallen Fairies from an early closing, although Evans earned praise in the role. Indeed, faults in Gilbert's libretto were likely as much to blame as any failings of McIntosh. The Observer wrote, "It is a strange compound of trifling and tragedy, of gossamer and gnashings of teeth ... the effect is a little like that of an act of Othello pieced into The Merry Wives of Windsor." Rutland Barrington, in his 1911 memoir, wrote: "I am inclined to attribute much of the failure of the opera to catch on to the fact that, owing to the entire absence of men's voices to balance the mass of soprani and alti, one's ears suffered from an unavoidable weariness, and a longing for the robust report of the male choristers; the humour of the play also seemed to me to have evaporated, to a great extent, with its conversion" to a comic opera.

Fallen Fairies has never been revived professionally, and has hardly ever been revived at all, although it was given a semi-staged concert revival in 2014 at the International Gilbert and Sullivan Festival in Harrogate, England. Early in 1909, Workman had planned to produce revivals of several Gilbert and Sullivan operas (and two Gilbert operas) at the Savoy after Fallen Fairies, but after his dispute with Gilbert, this idea was out of the question.

== Roles and original cast ==
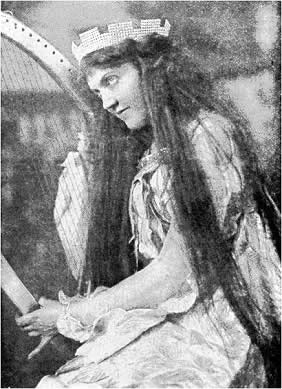
Nancy McIntosh as Selene

Fairies

- The Fairy Ethais (tenor) – Claude Flemming
- The Fairy Phyllon (bass-baritone) – Leo Sheffield
- Selene, the Fairy Queen (soprano) – Nancy McIntosh (replaced by Amy Evans)
- Darine, (mezzo-soprano) – Madie Hope
- Zayda (mezzo-soprano) – Jessie Rose
- Locrine (contralto) – Ethel Morrison
- Zara (speaking role) – Mabel Burnege
- Cora (mezzo-soprano) – Rita Otway
- Leila (mezzo-soprano) – Ruby Gray
- Neodie (speaking role) – Alice Cox
- Fleta (mezzo-soprano) – Marjorie Dawes
- Chloris (non-speaking role) – Miriam Lycett
- Maia (non-speaking role) – Gladys Lancaster
- Ina (non-speaking role) – Isabel Agnew
- Lutin, a serving fairy (comic baritone) – C. H. Workman

Mortals

- Sir Ethais, a Hunnish Knight (tenor) – Claude Flemming
- Sir Phyllon, a Hunnish Knight (bass-baritone) – Leo Sheffield
- Lutin, Sir Ethais's Henchman (comic baritone) – C. H. Workman

== Synopsis ==
=== Act I ===
The scene is laid in Fairyland, outside the Fairy Queen's bower, which for the purposes of the opera, is supposed to be located on the upper side of a cloud which floats over the Earth.

Jessie Rose as Zayda

The fairies sing of the "wicked world" below, which they believe is populated by mortals who sin throughout their lives. Selene, their Queen, tells them that Lutin, the only fairy who has ever set foot on solid ground, will soon be returning home after a long absence. Ethais and Phyllon reveal that every fairy has an exact counterpart in the mortal world, the only difference being that the fairies are absolutely free from sin, while the identical-looking mortal is "stained with every kind of infamy."

Lutin arrives, and the eager fairies question him about what he has observed down below, but Lutin says it is too shocking to tell. Lutin tells them that their King has a gift for the fairies, and he has commanded Ethais and Phyllon to journey to mid-earth to receive it. They depart.

The fairies wonder why, if the mortal world is so miserable, its inhabitants do not take their own lives. Selene explains that mortals have one great gift that makes life worth living – the gift of Love. The fairies are in wonder at Selene's description, as they have never experienced Love. Selene explains that Love is unnecessary. Moreover, it is impossible for them to experience it, as only a mortal can inspire love, and mortals cannot set foot in Fairyland.

Zayda points out that there is a "half-forgotten law" that, when a fairy leaves his home to visit earth, those whom he leaves behind may summon his mortal counterpart from below, who may fill the absent fairy's place until he returns. Selene is shocked that the fairies would consider invoking this law, but the other fairies point out a possible benefit. They suggest that once the mortals have observed the fairies' immaculate lives, they would return to Earth and reform mankind's sinful ways. Selene agrees, and they summon Sir Ethais and Sir Phyllon, the mortal counterparts to the two recently departed fairies.

On arriving, both Sir Ethais and Sir Phyllon immediately suspect the other of some kind of wizardry, and they start fighting. The fairies, who have never seen combat, believe it is a game. Sir Ethais is wounded in the arm. When the fairies step forward, the two knights are immediately taken with their beauty, and agree to stop fighting. The fairies, too, are immediately smitten with the men. Selene explains that the fairies wish to teach them how to live good and pure lives, while commenting in an aside how attractive they are. The men vow immediately to reform their sinful ways, taking tutelage from the fairies.

Selene wonders if there is a way that mortals show loyalty to a Queen. They explain that it is done with "a very long and tender kiss ... preferably, just below the nose." The fairies have never heard of this procedure, but they are pleased to be kissed on the lips, as they know it carries great weight with the knights.

C. H. Workman as Lutin

Sir Ethais is weak from loss of blood, and asks to summon his henchman, Lutin, who is skilled at healing. The fairy Lutin enters, and Sir Ethais mistakes him for his mortal counterpart. Lutin is appalled to find mortals in Fairyland, warning the fairies that Love is the source of all earthly sin. The fairies, now smitten with the men, do not believe him. Selene sends Lutin down below, so that his mortal counterpart can replace him. As he descends, the Fairies kneel at the feet of Sir Ethais and Sir Phyllon.

=== Act II ===
The fairies stand vigil outside of Selene's bower, where she has been tending Sir Ethais, who is delirious from the effects of his wound. The fairies are outraged at Selene's indecorous behaviour, and wonder if she is still fit to serve as Queen. Selene enters and tells them she has saved Sir Ethais's life, but the jealous fairies are not interested in listening to her. Selene is perplexed at her sisters' changed attitude.

Sir Ethais emerges from the bower, still weak from his wound. The pair acknowledge that they are in love. Selene offers to give up everything – her home, her honour, her life – to be with Sir Ethais. She gives him a ring as a pledge of her love. They go back into the bower together. Darine has overheard them. She too is wildly in love with Sir Ethais, and is feverishly jealous of Selene. Sir Phyllon enters and tries to court Darine, but she does not return his affection. After Sir Phyllon leaves, Selene re-enters. Sir Ethais has suffered a setback, and she fears he will die. Darine suggests that the only hope is to summon the fairy Lutin's mortal counterpart, who will be able to cure Sir Ethais. Selene is grateful for the suggestion, unaware that Darine intends to woo Sir Ethais for herself, once he is recovered.

The mortal Lutin arrives. He is just as enchanted with the fairies as Sir Ethais and Sir Phyllon were in Act I, and they are similarly impressed with him. Lutin is so taken with Fairyland that he calls it Paradise and assumes he must be dead. The fairies explain the situation, and they all vie for his attention, saying that they prefer his rugged appearance to men that are handsome. Zayda persuades all the other fairies to find food for Lutin. When they have left, she tells him that all of the other fairies have faults, and that she is the only fairy worthy of his esteem. When the other fairies return, they ask Lutin if he has a wife. He replies that he is married down below, but is a bachelor in Fairyland, which offends Zayda.

Darine enters, desperately seeking Lutin's aid to cure Sir Ethais. She is the fairy counterpart to Lutin's mortal wife. Lutin does not understand this and assumes his wife has followed him there to chastise his infidelity. After a lengthy misunderstanding, Darine finally gets through to Lutin, and he gives her a phial with the magical cure for Sir Ethais's wound.

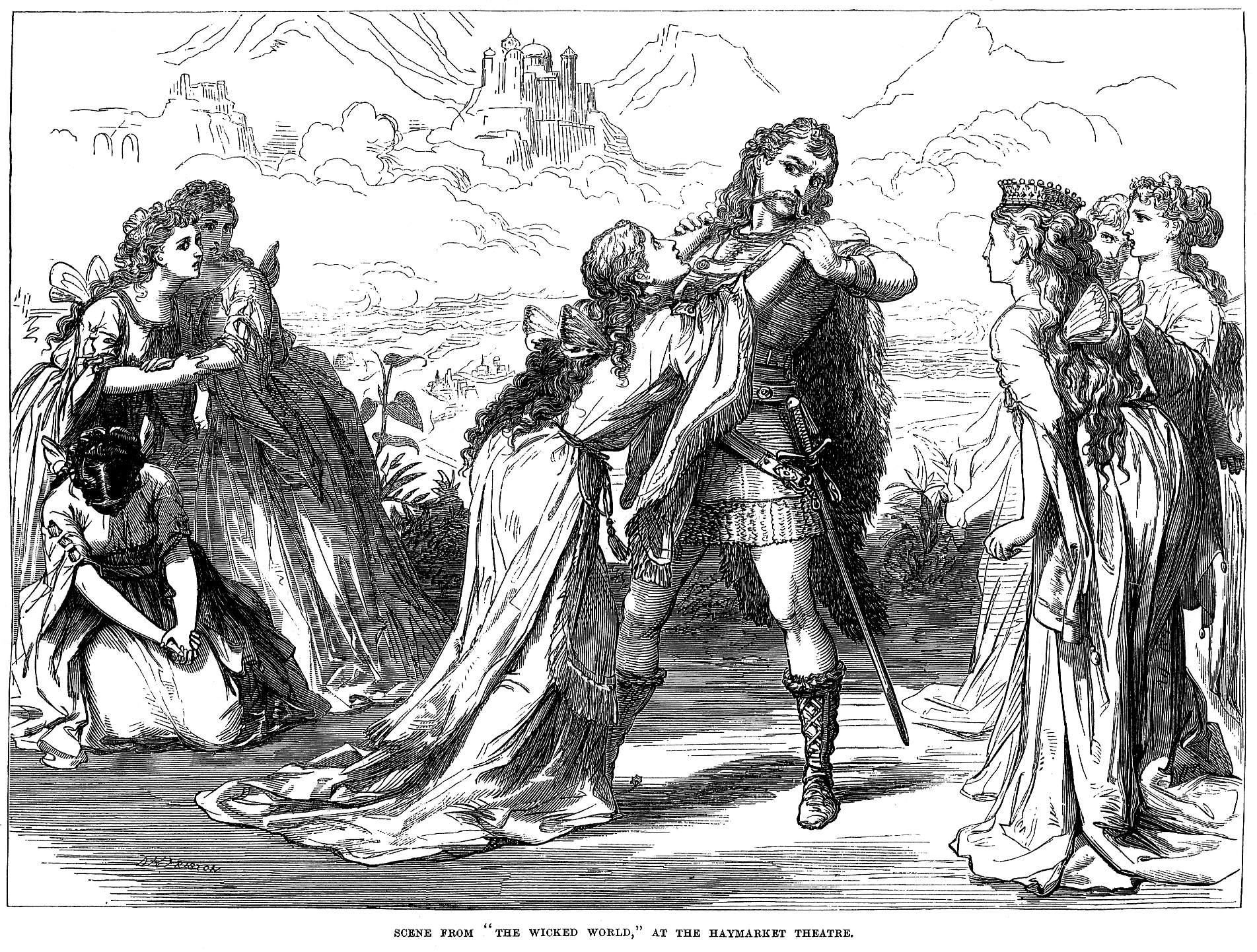
Ethais rejects Selene's pleading, choosing to return to earth without her

Darine contrives a ruse to win Sir Ethais's love. She tells him that Sir Phyllon had accused him of exaggerating the severity of his wound, so that he could avoid fighting again. Sir Ethais is outraged at being called a coward, and wants to challenge Sir Phyllon if he ever recovers. Darine tells him that she has the cure, but she will give it to him only if he promises to love her. Sir Ethais agrees, and observing that one beautiful woman is as good as another, gives Selene's ring to Darine. He takes the potion, and is cured. Sir Phyllon enters, and Sir Ethais accosts him. Their argument escalates, and Sir Ethais turns to Darine to confirm that Sir Phyllon had accused him of cowardice. Darine admits that this was only an artifice. Sir Ethais asks Sir Phyllon's forgiveness and renounces Darine. She implores him to reconsider.

Selene enters. She wonders why her sister is alone with Sir Ethais. Darine calls Selene a hypocrite. The other fairies now enter, and tell Selene that she is the source of all the ill that has blighted Fairyland. They urge her to relinquish the throne in favour of Darine. Admitting that she has been an unfit Queen, she takes off her crown and places it on Darine's head. Selene says that her kingdom is now in the heart of Sir Ethais, but Darine insists that he belongs to her, showing that she now has the ring that Selene had pledged to him. Selene is shocked, but Sir Ethais admits that he had parted with it in exchange for the cure to his wound. Selene pronounces him, of all men, "the most accursed." He begs her forgiveness, and in a rambling address she denounces him, but says that she will join him on earth.

Locrine bursts in with the news that the men's fairy counterparts are about to return. The mortal Lutin is much relieved, for while he finds Zayda enchanting, he cannot enjoy himself while Darine, who bears so close a resemblance to his wife, is looking on. Sir Phyllon and Lutin descend to earth. Selene frantically tries to detain Sir Ethais, saying that she wants to accompany him to earth, to be his "humble, silent, and submissive slave." But Sir Ethais has now tired of her. He casts her aside and returns to Earth, alone.

As soon as the men are gone, the fairies change their attitudes, as if awaking from a dream. With the mortals now gone from their midst, the chastened fairies admit that they have all sinned. The fairy Ethais arrives with the news that fairies, like mortals, can love. But Selene warns that love is a deadly snare. The chorus praise Selene's purity, and Darine returns the crown to her head. The fairies kneel in adoration at her feet.

== Musical numbers ==
Act I

- 1. Fairies, Locrine and Darine – "Oh, world below!"
- 2. Fairies, Zayda, Fleta, Locrine, Leila and Lutin – "Hail, Lutin, wondrous traveller!"
- 3. Lutin with Fairies" – One incident I'll tell that will appall"
- 4. Selene – "With all the misery, with all the shame"
- 5. Darine, Zayda and Fairies – "Man is a being all accuse"
- 6. Selene and Fairies – "And now to summon them"
- 7. Sir Ethais and Sir Phyllon – "By god and man, who brought us here, and how.... This is some wizardry of thy design"
- 8. Selene and Fairies – "Poor, purblind, wayward youths"
- 9. Sir Ethais and Sir Phyllon – "With keen remorse"
  - Darine, Zayda and Locrine – "Oh, gentle knights, with joy elate"
  - Selene – "If my obedient pupils you would be"
  - Sir Ethais, Sir Phyllon, Darine, Selene with Fairies – "When homage to his Queen a subject shows"
- 10. Act I Finale:
  - Lutin – "The warrior, girt in shining might"
  - Zayda, Darine, Selene, Ethais and Lutin – "Nay, heed him not!"
  - Lutin with Fairies – "Hark ye, you sir!"
  - Fairies, Sir Ethais and Sir Phyllon – "Oh, gallant gentlemen"

Act II

- 11. Fairies – "For many an hour"
- 12. Zayda and Fairies – "I never profess to make a guess"
- 12a Selene – "Oh love that rulest in our land"
- 13. Selene and Sir Ethais – "Thy features are fair and seemly"
- 14. Sir Ethais and Selene – "When a knight loves ladye"
- 15. Darine and Sir Phyllon – "But dost thou hear?"
- 16. Lutin, Fleta, Locrine, Cora, Leila – "Help! Help! Help!... A freak of nature, not of art"
- 17. Lutin with Fairies – "Suppose you take, with open mind"
- 18. Lutin with Fairies – "In yonder world, where devils strew"
- 19. Lutin with Fairies – "When husband supposes"
- 20. Darine – "Triumphant I!"
- 21. Darine, Zayda, Locrine, Fleta, Selene and Fairies – "Away, away! Thou art no Queen of ours"
- 22. Selene – "Hark ye, sir knight"
- 22a. Melodrame (Orchestra)
- 23. Act II Finale: Company – "Pure as the air"
