= Charles H. Workman =

English singer and actor (1872–1923)

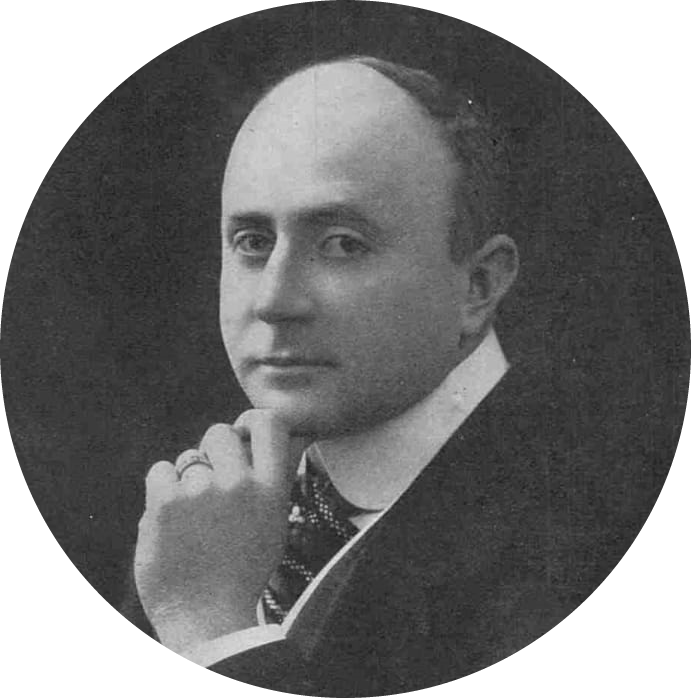
Workman in 1909

Charles Herbert Workman (5 May 1872 – 1 May 1923) was a singer and actor best known as a successor to George Grossmith in the comic baritone roles in Gilbert and Sullivan operas. He was variously credited as Charles H. Workman, C. Herbert Workman and C. H. Workman.

Workman joined the D'Oyly Carte Opera Company in 1894 and played several roles with the company in London before becoming principal comedian, for nearly a decade, with D'Oyly Carte touring companies. He was cast in the comic leads for the two London repertory seasons of Gilbert and Sullivan at the Savoy Theatre in 1906−07 and 1908−09, earning mostly enthusiastic reviews. After this, he left the company and took on the management of the Savoy Theatre. He soon fell out with W. S. Gilbert over his production of the dramatist's Fallen Fairies; Gilbert banned Workman from appearing in his operas in Britain.

Workman subsequently had leading roles in several West End musical comedies and operettas. In 1914 he relocated to Australia, where he spent much of his later career in his old Gilbert and Sullivan roles with the J. C. Williamson Gilbert and Sullivan Opera Company, and in a few parts in musicals. At the age of 50 he died at sea near Hong Kong while returning from a Williamson tour.

== Life and career ==
Charles Herbert Workman was born in Bootle, on the outskirts of Liverpool, Lancashire, the son of Charles Workman and his wife, Sarah, née Forrest. He was educated at Waterloo College, Liverpool, and studied singing under his brother, Albert Edward Workman.

=== D'Oyly Carte years ===
A newcomer to the stage, Workman joined the D'Oyly Carte Opera Company in 1894 as Calynx in a provincial tour of Utopia, Limited, making his debut at the Shakespeare Memorial Theatre, Stratford-upon-Avon. In 1895 he played the roles of Pedrillo in The Chieftain, Bunthorne's Solicitor in Patience and Pennyfather in After All!, the curtain raiser for a revival of The Mikado. He then created the small part of Ben Hashbaz in The Grand Duke at the Savoy Theatre, London (1896). He later created the part of Adam in F. C. Burnand and R. C. Lehmann's His Majesty (1897; appearing briefly as King Ferdinand when George Grossmith abandoned the part, until Henry Lytton took over). Workman was Simon in Old Sarah, the companion piece for the first revival of The Yeomen of the Guard (1897). In The Grand Duchess of Gerolstein that year, he played Carl.

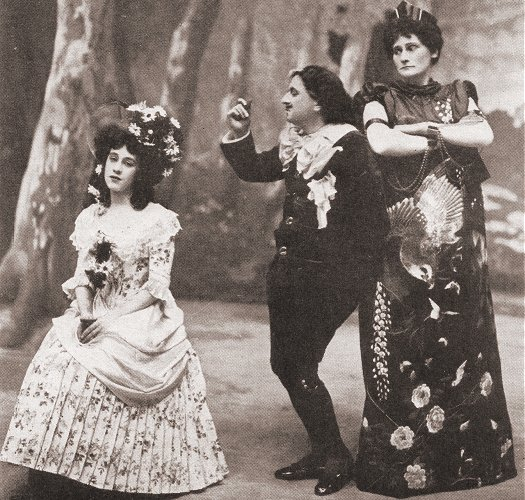
As Bunthorne in Patience, with Clara Dow (left) and Louie René

Beginning in 1897, Workman was promoted to principal comedian in D'Oyly Carte touring companies, appearing as the Lord Chancellor in Iolanthe, Ko-Ko in The Mikado, and Jack Point in Yeomen. He toured with D'Oyly Carte until 1906, appearing as John Wellington Wells in The Sorcerer, Sir Joseph Porter in H.M.S. Pinafore, Major-General Stanley in The Pirates of Penzance, Reginald Bunthorne in Patience, the Lord Chancellor, King Gama in Princess Ida, Ko-Ko, Jack Point, the Duke of Plaza-Toro in The Gondoliers, and Scaphio in Utopia. He also appeared as Hassan in The Rose of Persia (1901) and as the Learned Judge in Trial by Jury beginning in 1904. After a brief tour of South Africa with his own company he returned to the Savoy Theatre in 1906 and played the principal comedian roles created by George Grossmith for the company's repertory seasons there and on tour with the company, until 1909, except that he never played a role in Ruddigore, as that opera was not in the D'Oyly Carte repertory during his tenure.

In 1907 The Times commented, "As the Duke of Plaza-Toro, Mr. Workman surpasses both his predecessors". Of his Jack Point, the paper said: "His patter is delivered with a clearness that neither of the older performers could surpass; he dances as lightly as either, and has as spontaneous a sense of fun. His was the chief triumph of Saturday night." However, The Times warned Workman, "in Patience [he] makes the grave mistake of trying to add fun of his own by clowning to the part of Bunthorne. He is too clever an actor to be allowed to go on in this path without warning." Workman redeemed himself in Iolanthe: "The Lord Chancellor of Mr. Workman is a masterpiece, and the whole audience were of one mind as to the double encore for the dancing trio, and the 'Nightmare' song was sung with marvellous glibness."

In Yeomen, when Workman was playing Jack Point, in one scene he stood between the ladies portraying Elsie Maynard and Phoebe Meryll. Workman wrote: "I used to kiss the cheek of first one and then the other, quickly and repeatedly, and Sir William thought there was too much kissing for a Savoy audience. 'You would cut the kissing, then?' I said. 'I would not', he returned drolly, 'but I must ask you to.'"

=== Later years ===
Gilbert, Workman and German at a rehearsal of Fallen Fairies

Workman then left the D'Oyly Carte organisation and became an actor-manager. He leased the Savoy and produced two comic operas: Eden & Somerville's The Mountaineers (1909), appearing as Pierre, and W. S. Gilbert and Edward German's Fallen Fairies (1909), appearing as Lutin. He then produced an Edwardian musical comedy, Two Merry Monarchs (1910), appearing as Rolandyl, and an opera, Gluck's Orpheus, (1910).

None of these was a financial success. The production of Fallen Fairies was particularly disappointing, leading to a serious battle between Workman and Gilbert. Workman expected Gilbert's libretto, based on Gilbert's successful earlier play The Wicked World, to be followed by more works with the dramatist. However, Workman and his financial backers quarrelled with Gilbert over the casting of the librettist's protégée, Nancy McIntosh, as Selene, the Fairy Queen. At the end of the first week of the run, Workman replaced McIntosh. Gilbert angrily forbade Workman from ever again appearing in any of his works on stage in the United Kingdom, although Gilbert could not enforce a prohibition elsewhere or in the recording studio. In 1910 and 1911, Workman recorded songs, mostly patter songs, for Odeon. Nineteen of these songs were re-issued by Pearl in 1974. It is likely that, but for this conflict, Workman would have continued as principal comedian for the D'Oyly Carte company.

Workman continued his acting career in London, earning good notices, in The Chocolate Soldier (1910–11, running for 500 performances), Nightbirds (1911) and The Girl in the Taxi (1912–13). In 1914 he travelled to Australia where he once again appeared in Gilbert and Sullivan operas with the J. C. Williamson Gilbert and Sullivan Opera Company (1918 and thereafter). In 1919 Rupert D'Oyly Carte wrote to Workman asking him to return to the D'Oyly Carte company: "We intend to present Gilbert and Sullivan at the Savoy again, and if we knew you would be coming to London, we would await your arrival, so that your reappearance and the revival of Gilbert and Sullivan opera might be made two important simultaneous events. You will, of course, play all your old parts. Excellent news, this, if it materialises." (Note: There is some doubt about the authenticity of this exchange. According to Lytton's biographer Brian Jones there is no record of it in the D'Oyly Carte archives, and it was Workman who approached Carte rather than vice versa.) In the event Workman did not return and the comic roles were played by Henry Lytton.

In Australia in 1920, Workman appeared in the "mystery musical comedy" F.F.F. He also played Ali Baba in the first Australian production of Chu Chin Chow (1920–21) alongside Louie Pounds as Alcolom. In 1922–23, he led a tour of India and east Asia with his wife, Bessel Adams, a former D'Oyly Carte singer, playing in Gilbert and Sullivan, again with J. C. Williamson's company. Adams died suddenly of heart failure on that tour in Calcutta in February 1923. Workman died in May of the same year, just short of his 51st birthday, in a steamer outside Hong Kong, returning from the same tour.

Workman as Sir Joseph Porter (H.M.S. Pinafore), the Lord Chancellor (Iolanthe); Ko-Ko (The Mikado); Jack Point (The Yeomen of the Guard) and the Duke of Plaza Toro (The Gondoliers)

== Recordings ==
From the Savoy operas, Workman recorded 19 numbers for the Odeon label: Trial by Jury – "When I, good friends, was called to the bar" (1910); The Sorcerer – "My name is John Wellington Wells" (1910); H.M.S. Pinafore – "When I was a lad I served a term" (1910); The Pirates of Penzance – "I am the very model of a modern major general" (1910) and "Sighing softly to the river" (1911–12); Patience – "If you're anxious for to shine" (1910); Iolanthe – "Love, unrequited, robs me of my rest" (1910), "When I went to the bar as a very young man" (1911–12) and "The Law is the true embodiment" (1911–12); Princess Ida – "If you give me your attention" and "Whene'er I spoke sarcastic joke" (1910); The Yeomen of the Guard – "A private buffoon" (1910) "I've jibe and joke" (1910) and "I have a song to sing, o" (with Elsie Spain, soprano)" (1911–12); The Gondoliers – "In enterprise of martial kind" and "I stole the prince" (1910); Utopia Limited – "First you're born, " (1911–12); The Rose of Persia – "There was a small street arab" (1911–12). These recordings have been reissued by Pearl on LP and CD. His other recordings are five numbers from Oscar Straus's The Chocolate Soldier: "That would be lovely" (with Evelyn D'Alroy, soprano), "Sympathy" (with D'Alroy), "The letter song", "The tale of a coat" (with D'Alroy, Amy Augarde, mezzo-soprano, and Lemprière Pringle, bass) and the Finale, Act II (with D'Alroy, Augarde and Pringle).

== Notes, references and sources ==
=== Sources ===
- Bettany, Clemence (1975). D'Oyly Carte Centenary. London: D'Oyly Carte Opera Company. OCLC 910206945.
- Jones, Brian (2005). Lytton, Gilbert and Sullivan's Jester. London: Trafford. ISBN 978-1-4120-5482-9.
- Parker, John, ed. (1922). Who's Who in the Theatre (fourth ed.). London: Sir Isaac Pitman and Sons. OCLC 473894893.
- Rollins, Cyril; R. John Witts (1962). The D'Oyly Carte Opera Company in Gilbert and Sullivan Operas: A Record of Productions, 1875–1961. London: Michael Joseph. OCLC 504581419.
