= W. J. Macqueen-Pope =

British writer

Walter James Macqueen-Pope (11 April 1888 – 27 June 1960), known familiarly as Popie, was an English theatre historian and publicist. From a theatrical family which could be traced back to contemporaries of Shakespeare, he was in management for the first part of his career, but switched to publicity, in which field he became well known. He was a prolific writer of books about the theatre, and in particular its more glamorous aspects. He also described himself as an "authority on pantomime".

Beginning in 1955, Macqueen-Pope gave a series of fifteen-minute talks about the theatre on BBC television, in a show called "Popie".

== Biography ==
Macqueen-Pope, always known by his initials or, familiarly, as "Popie", was the eldest son of Walter George Pope and Frederica Macqueen. He was educated privately and at Tollington School. He first worked in a shipping office but became connected with the theatre as private secretary to George Dance, the playwright, manager and theatrical philanthropist. He tried his hand as a playwright, with limited success: The Times was dismissive of his short play, The Punctual Sex, in 1919. Sir Alfred Butt appointed him business manager at the Queen's Theatre, and after holding similar posts at other West End theatres, and holding the post of manager and secretary of Alexandra Palace from 1922 to 1925, he was appointed general manager of the Duke of York's Theatre in 1927, and was put in charge of the new Whitehall Theatre before it opened in 1930. The Times said of his career, "it was as press representative at the Palladium in 1925 that he began to develop his special talent for passing on to others ... his love and knowledge of the theatre generally and in particular of Drury Lane, of the Haymarket (Theatre of Perfection) and of the Gaiety (Theatre of Enchantment)."

Macqueen-Pope was in charge of publicity at Drury Lane for 21 years, including four years running publicity for the whole of ENSA, which had its headquarters in the building. After World War II he produced books about all the theatres with which he had been principally associated, and many other books, including a biography of Ivor Novello, of whom Macqueen-Pope approved as possessing glamour, the quality he most prized in the theatre and which he felt was in short supply in the post-war world. In 1955 he began to give talks about the theatre on BBC television, using his nickname, "Popie" as a title for his series.

After his retirement as publicist for Drury Lane, he continued as the theatre's historian until his death.

== Private life ==
As Walter J. M. Pope, he married Stella Suzanne Schumann (1886–1973) at Edmonton in 1912. There was one daughter of the marriage, whose birth was registered in 1916 as Moya Macqueen-Pope. In 1940, Moya married William A. Sutton at St Pancras, London.

Pope died at St George's Hospital, Westminster aged 72, his home address being given as 9, Oakdale, East Barnet, Hertfordshire, leaving a modest estate valued at £1,664. His widow died in 1973.

== Publications ==
Macqueen-Pope expounded his views in many books between World War II and 1960. These included:

- Theatre Royal, Drury Lane, 1945
- Carriages at Eleven, 1947
- Haymarket, Theatre of Perfection, 1948
- Twenty Shillings in the Pound, 1948
- Indiscreet Guide to Theatreland, 1947
- Gaiety, Theatre of Enchantment, 1949
- The Melodies Linger On, 1950
- Ghosts and Greasepaint, 1951
- Ivor, The Story of an Achievement, 1951
- Ladies First, 1952
- Shirt Fronts and Sables, 1953
- Fortune's Favourite: The Life and Times of Franz Lehár, 1953 (with D. L. Murray)
- Back Numbers, 1954
- Pillars of Drury Lane, 1955
- Nights of Gladness, 1956
- Give Me Yesterday, 1957
- St James's: Theatre of Distinction, 1958
- The Footlights Flickered, 1959
- Goodbye Piccadilly, 1960, his autobiography, posthumously published
