= Sir George Power, 7th Baronet =

Irish singer and actor (1846–1928)

George Power

Sir George Power, 7th Baronet (24 December 1846 – 17 October 1928) was an operatic tenor known for his performances in early Gilbert and Sullivan operas with the D'Oyly Carte Opera Company, most famously creating the roles in London of Ralph Rackstraw in H.M.S. Pinafore (1878) and Frederic in The Pirates of Penzance (1880).

He later became a noted voice teacher and continued to perform, mostly at society events. On the death of his elder brother, in 1903, he became the seventh baronet of Kilfane.

== Early years ==
Power was born in Kilkenny, the fourth son of Sir John Power of Kilfane, and his wife, Frances Elizabeth, née Wade, from Clonabrany, County Meath. He was educated at Cheltenham College and Trinity College, Dublin, and studied voice in Milan and Florence from 1873 to 1876, with Achille Graffigna and Francesco Lamperti, among others.

In 1876, Power first appeared on stage at the Teatro Manoel in Valletta, Malta, singing Count Almaviva in The Barber of Seville. He made his London stage debut in December 1877 at Her Majesty's Theatre playing the tenor role in Thomas Haynes Bayly's English version of Adolphe Adam's opera The Swiss Cottage. This proved to be Power's only appearance in serious opera.

Power joined Richard D'Oyly Carte's Comedy-Opera Company in February 1878 at the Opera Comique in London, succeeding George Bentham in the leading tenor role of Alexis in Gilbert and Sullivan's comic opera The Sorcerer. From March to April 1878 Power also played the Defendant in Trial by Jury when that companion piece was added to the bill at the Opera Comique. He created the role of Ralph Rackstraw in the next Gilbert and Sullivan opera, H.M.S. Pinafore, "one of the most successful pieces of musical theatre of the Victorian era" playing the character from May 1878 to February 1880. The Daily News wrote that Power "displayed a light tenor voice of very agreeable quality, and acted the part of the sentimental lover well", although The Times found his intonation "a little uncertain".

When The Pirates of Penzance premiered in London, Power originated the role of Frederic in that opera. Power received warm reviews for this role from the London press. The Times said that his "sympathetic tenor voice was heard to great advantage in the sentimental music", and The Standard wrote that he "acts ... just in that simple-minded way that brings out most strongly the absurdity of the character, and he sings exceedingly well." A critic from The New York Times, however, commented: "Temple has been a member of the Gilbert-Sullivan company from the first. Mr George Power has not: and his "thin" style is a material drawback. As an actor, he is weak, as a man he is not interesting, as a tenor he is small. Once or twice he sang sweetly, and he was always in tune. As a concert singer he would probably be very successful in sentimental ballads; as Frederic he is unsatisfactory." The Era agreed with the majority: "a very agreeable light tenor voice and a pleasing style, qualities which have already gained for him no little favour in the previous opera … [he has] good taste vocally and a fair amount of histrionic skill."

During the run of Pirates, Power took part in some Sunday matinée performances of new operettas along with D'Oyly Carte colleague Rutland Barrington, and on one occasion acted in a non-musical play, L'Aventurière, given in the original French by a cast headed by Herbert Beerbohm Tree. Power played Frederic until October 1880, when he left the D'Oyly Carte company.

== Later years ==
Power, Leonora Braham, Jessie Bond and Julia Gwynne at Sullivan's memorial in 1914

Over the following months, Power performed mostly in society concerts. In May 1881, he appeared in the operetta Incognito, by Henri Logé, and in July 1881, Power played Lieut. de Blanc-Mange in a short operetta, Out of Sight, by Frederick Clay and B. C. Stephenson. In August 1881, he created the role of Charles Lorrimore in the Edward Solomon and Henry Pottinger Stephens comic opera Claude Duval, at the Olympic Theatre, opposite Marion Hood, who had been his partner in The Pirates of Penzance. The production ran for only 54 performances, and Power left the production three days before it closed in October.

Power then became a teacher of singing, continuing to make occasional appearances on the stage until the end of the century, mostly in concert and society events, and with Percy North's Operetta Company. In 1885 he played Colonel Sylvester at Hove in a new operetta, When One Door Shuts Another Opens by Harriet Young and Charles Thomas. His students included the Russian tenor Vladimir Rosing.

When his elder brother Sir Adam Clayton Power (1844–1903) died, Power succeeded to his family's baronetcy as the seventh baronet of Kilfane. Together with Jessie Bond, Leonora Braham and Julia Gwynne, he was one of four artistes of the original D'Oyly Carte Opera Company who attended a reunion at the Savoy Hotel in 1914. The four then posed for a group photograph beside Arthur Sullivan Memorial in the Victoria Embankment Gardens.

On 2 September 1915, by then in his late 60s, Power married Eva Gertrude Boulton (1864–1952), the daughter of family friend Sir Samuel Bagster Boulton and Sophia Louisa Cooper. There were no children, and the Power of Kilfane baronetcy ended on his death in 1928.

Power died in Kensington, London, aged 81, and is buried in the Boulton Family Vault in Brookwood Cemetery.

== Notes ==
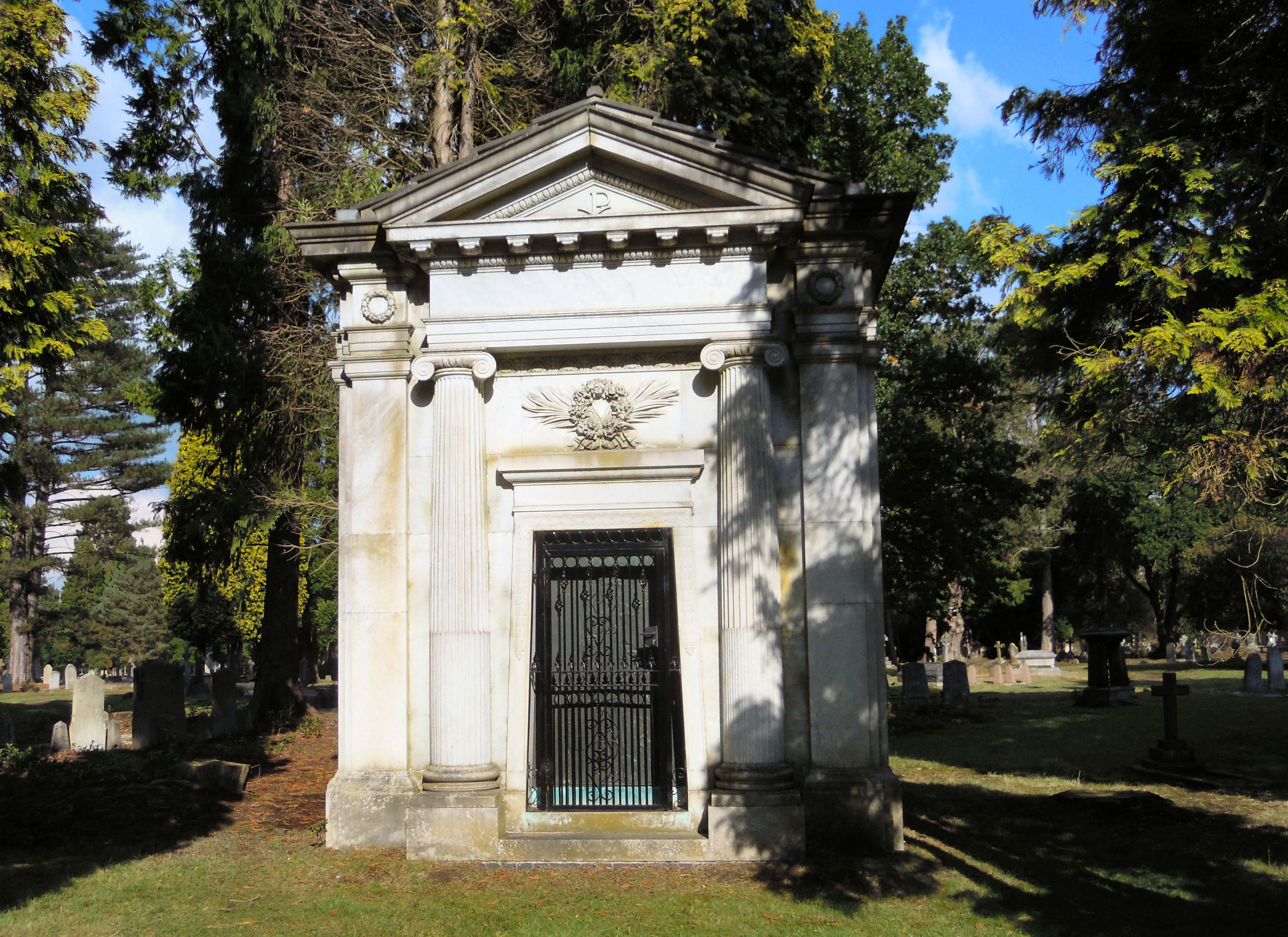
Boulton Family Vault in Brookwood Cemetery

Baronetage of the United Kingdom
Preceded by Adam Power	Baronet (of Kilfane); 1903–1928	Dormant
