= Leonora Braham =

English singer and actress (1853–1931)

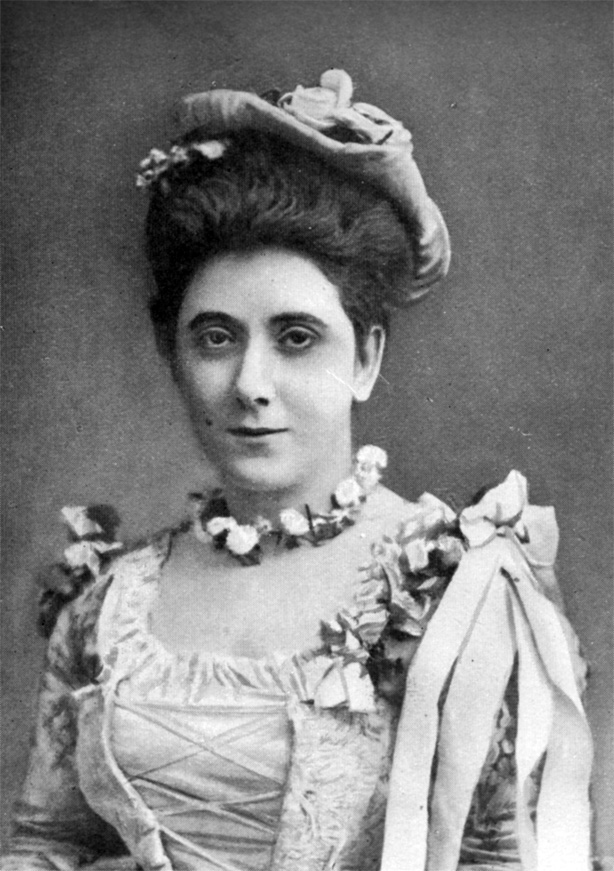
Leonora Braham

Leonora Braham (born Leonora Abraham; 3 February 1853 – 23 November 1931) was an English opera singer and actress primarily known as the creator of principal soprano roles in the Gilbert and Sullivan comic operas.

Beginning in 1870, Braham starred for several years in the intimate musical German Reed Entertainments in London. In 1878, she moved to North America, where she continued to perform in comic opera. After returning to England, she was engaged by the D'Oyly Carte Opera Company, creating five of the leading soprano roles in the hit series of Gilbert and Sullivan operas, including the title role in Patience (1881), Phyllis in Iolanthe (1882), the title role in Princess Ida (1884), Yum-Yum in The Mikado (1885), and Rose Maybud in Ruddigore (1887). She also played Aline in the first revival of The Sorcerer (1884–85).

After leaving the D'Oyly Carte company, Braham continued to perform in England and widely on tour, starring in comic opera and grand opera in Australia, South America and South Africa. By the mid-1890s, she returned to Britain, playing in musical comedy and light opera, briefly rejoining the D'Oyly Carte Opera Company. She then continued to perform until 1912 in Britain and America, including with Lillie Langtry in plays without music.

== Life and career ==
Braham was born into a Jewish family in Bloomsbury, London, the only daughter and eldest of three children of the writer and educator Philip Abraham and Harriet Abraham née Boss. She began working as a teacher before beginning to sing professionally.

=== Early career and first marriage ===
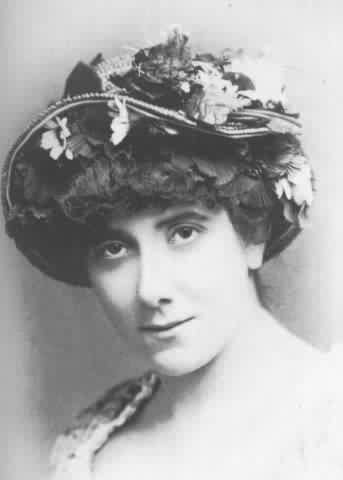
Braham as Patience

Braham's first professional stage appearance was at St George's Hall, London, in 1870, in a revival of Gilbert and Clay's Ages Ago. Mr and Mrs Thomas German Reed, the producers, starred with Braham. Braham received encouraging notices. She continued performing for the German Reeds for several years, creating various roles, while at the same time studying at the Royal Academy of Music, where she won the Llewelyn Thomas gold medal competition. In April 1878, shortly after her wedding to her first husband, Frederick E. Lucy Barnes (1856–1880), a church organist, conductor and composer from Birkenhead, near Liverpool, the couple moved to North America, first to Montreal, Canada, The two had a son, Stanton Barnes.

From December 1879, she played the title role in Gilbert and Clay's Princess Toto in New York and then in Boston and Philadelphia. The theatrical newspaper The Era wrote that she gave "a most excellent performance, both vocally and histrionically. She has a sweet, light soprano, finely cultivated, and executed very effectively". W. S. Gilbert, Arthur Sullivan and Richard D'Oyly Carte, in New York for the premiere of The Pirates of Penzance, saw her and liked her performance. She also starred in Billee Taylor in New York.Her husband died in early 1880 while in Canada, leaving her with their baby son. The death has been variously described as a suicide or an accident. Later that year, she played the leading role of Dolly in a revival of Alfred Cellier's The Sultan of Mocha, at the Union Square Theatre in New York.

=== Principal D'Oyly Carte soprano ===
When she returned to England, Braham briefly rejoined the German Reeds and was also performing in concerts. She was soon chosen to create the title role in Gilbert and Sullivan's Patience at the Opera Comique with the D'Oyly Carte Opera Company in 1881, in which she again received excellent notices. She remained the company's principal soprano until 1887, continuing as Patience when the opera transferred to the Savoy Theatre, and next creating the role of Phyllis in Iolanthe there in 1882, again to critical praise.

These were followed by the title role in Princess Ida in 1884. Braham was initially cast to sing the role of Lady Psyche in the latter opera, but was promoted during the rehearsal period, when the original choice for the part, American Lillian Russell, had a disagreement with W. S. Gilbert and was dismissed. Braham, generally regarded as a light lyric soprano, nevertheless received good notices in the heavier role. All of the other roles created by Braham with the company had been, and were to be, girls of humble birth whose spirit and charm attracts a rich or high-born mate, and Braham seemed well suited to these. Gilbert later wrote: "The part ... required a tall, dignified lady, [but] was given to Miss Braham at almost the last moment." In its review of Princess Ida, The Times commented: "She does not stand 'Among her maidens, higher by the head', neither can she suppress, even in moments of danger and excitement, the beaming smile, so pleasant in itself and so little fitted to a stern reformer of womankind. But if not an imposing, Miss Braham is at least a charming Princess, who, moreover, delivers her speech with admirable correctness of metrical diction, and displays an agreeable voice."

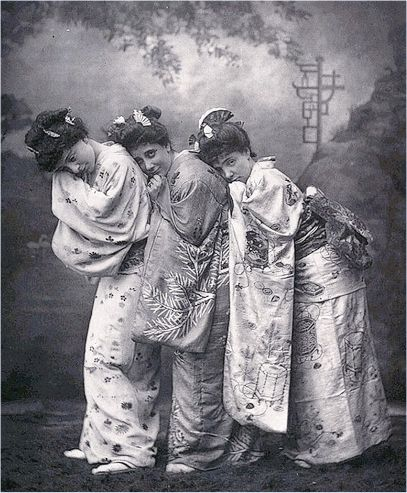
Sybil Grey, Braham and Jessie Bond in The Mikado

She played the leading role of Aline in the 1884–85 revival of The Sorcerer, receiving enthusiastic reviews. In 1885, she created the part of Yum-Yum in The Mikado, perhaps her best known role. The Era reported that "Miss Braham has in the part of Yum-Yum full opportunities for displaying those powers of finished acting and accomplished vocalism which have long since won for her the friendly admiration of all habitues of the Savoy." William Beatty-Kingston, writing in The Theatre, thought that she "sang and acted to perfection. ... [S]he was more fascinating than ever, and more than once saved the action from dragging by her unaffected vivacity and winsome playfulness." During the run of The Mikado, Carte, Gilbert and Sullivan considered letting Braham's contract expire because of her drinking.

She next created the part of Rose Maybud in Ruddigore in January 1887. During the summer of 1886, she had secretly married the Scotsman James Duncan Young, previously a principal tenor with one of Carte's touring companies, and Carte soon had another reason to dismiss the actress. In early 1887, shortly into the run of Ruddigore, Braham finally informed Carte that she was pregnant with her second child. This was not acceptable, particularly as the chorus sings, to her prim and proper character Rose Maybud: "Rose, all glowing with virgin blushes, say – Is anybody going to marry you today?" She soon left the Savoy, and Geraldine Ulmar was hastily called back from America to assume the role. Braham and Young's daughter was born on 6 May. She and Young later had a son. Braham created more of the Gilbert and Sullivan heroines than any other soprano, and she was the only English soprano to create more than one such role.

=== Peripatetic performer ===
Braham, her husband and children travelled to Australia later in 1887, appearing there in a number of operas including Princess Ida, H.M.S. Pinafore, The Mikado, Patience, and Iolanthe with J. C. Williamson's opera company (along with other ex-D'Oyly Carte players such as Alice Barnett) and in Alfred Cellier's Dorothy and Edward Jakobowski's Erminie in the title role. The Argus of Melbourne wrote, of her first Australian performance, that she was "Petite in form, animated and graceful in bearing, displaying colloquial tones of sonorous quality and polite inflexion, and having a singing voice both sweet and full, and of high soprano range. Miss Braham got through an arduous first appearance with complete success." She performed again in England from 1888 to 1890, in London and in the provinces, in works other than Gilbert and Sullivan including Carina at Toole's Theatre, on tour in Manon and Gretna Green at the Comedy Theatre (1889–90), together with her old Savoy colleague Richard Temple. She also toured in Nanon, Jakobowski's Paolo and Miss Esmeralda.

In 1890, and then again in 1891–92, Braham and her family (including two children under the age of four), together with other D'Oyly Carte regulars, including R. Scott Fishe, toured South America with the Edwin Cleary Opera Company, entertaining audiences in Buenos Aires, Montevideo, Valparaíso, Lima, Rio de Janeiro and other cities. Braham played Yum-Yum in The Mikado, Mabel in The Pirates of Penzance, Aline in The Sorcerer, the title roles in Patience, Dorothy, Erminie and Pepita, and in Billie Taylor. Braham received generally good notices. The Standard said of her Dorothy in Buenos Aires, "if her portrayal of the wayward English heiress is not perfect, then I say emphatically there is no perfection in this imperfect world." The company was shipwrecked off the west coast of South America in the middle of the tour, losing most of their possessions (but there were no deaths), and Braham's husband injured his arm. Back in England in 1892, she toured in her own production of The Duke's Diversion by another Carte singer, Michael Dwyer. Even after her shipwreck experience, Braham and family soon braved the dangers of ocean travel to tour for two years in South Africa, where she again performed the title role in Dorothy, roles in other operettas, La Cigale, The Old Guard (Dion Boucicault)), La Mascotte, Maritana, Haddon Hall and Rip van Winkle, her old Gilbert and Sullivan roles in Iolanthe, The Mikado and Princess Ida, and roles in grand opera, such as Pagliacci and Cavalleria rusticana, La traviata, Il trovatore and Faust.

George Power, Braham, Jessie Bond and Julia Gwynne at Sullivan's memorial in 1914

In 1895 Braham was engaged at Daly's Theatre in London as Lady Barbara Cripps in the hit Edwardian musical comedy An Artist's Model. She rejoined D'Oyly Carte in 1896, playing Julia Jellicoe in a tour of the last Savoy opera, The Grand Duke. During part of this tour, she also played Phoebe in The Yeomen of the Guard and Yum-Yum in The Mikado. This was her last engagement with the D'Oyly Carte company.

=== Later career and retirement ===
Braham continued to perform, from 1897 to 1912, in London, the British provinces, and New York. In 1897, she was touring as Norah in Charles Villiers Stanford's opera Shamus O'Brien and as the Countess in Olivette, followed by Juanita in The Dove-Cot, adapted by Charles Brookfield from La Jalouse, at the Duke of York's Theatre in London. On Broadway, she played Donna Adelina Gonzales in Because She Loved Him So, the American adaptation of The Dove-Cot, at Hoyt's Theatre in 1899. The following year, she toured in Britain with a company using the name of the German Reed Entertainments. She also toured for two years with Lillie Langtry in plays without music, including The Degenerates. Later roles included the Widow Melnotte in The Lady of Lyons and Madame Michu in The Little Michus. Her last role was as Amelia Dovedale in Captain Scarlet at the St James's Theatre in 1912. Together with George Power, Jessie Bond and Julia Gwynne, she was one of four artistes of the original D'Oyly Carte Opera Company who attended a reunion at the Savoy Hotel in 1914. The four then posed for a group photograph beside the Arthur Sullivan Memorial in the Victoria Embankment Gardens (see photo).

She continued to be interested in Gilbert and Sullivan during her retirement, writing of her G&S experiences in "Happy Wanderings of a Savoyard," published in The Gilbert & Sullivan Journal in October 1926. Together with Jessie Bond and Sybil Grey, she participated in March 1930 at the Gilbert & Sullivan Society in a 45th anniversary reunion of "Three Little Maids from School." Braham faced poverty during her last years, when her husband was confined to a mental institution.

Braham died in London in 1931 at the age of 78.
