= Jessie Bond =

English singer and actor

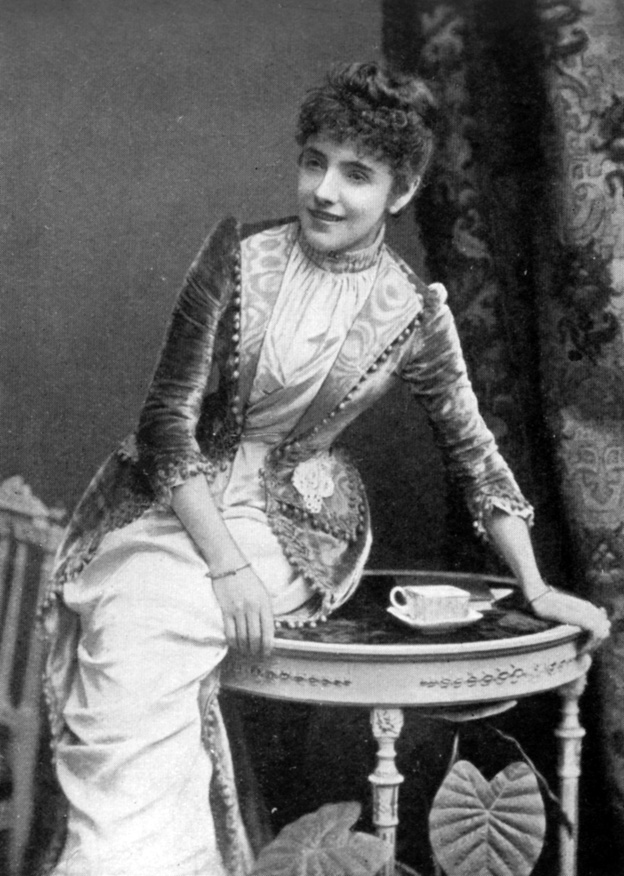
Jessie Bond

Jessie Charlotte Bond (10 January 1853 – 17 June 1942) was an English singer and actress best known for creating the mezzo-soprano soubrette roles in the Gilbert and Sullivan comic operas. She spent twenty years on the stage, the bulk of them with the D'Oyly Carte Opera Company.

Musical from an early age, Bond began a concert singing career in Liverpool by 1870. At the age of 17, she entered into a brief, unhappy marriage. After leaving her abusive husband, she continued her concert career and studied at the Royal Academy of Music in London with such famous singing teachers as Manuel García.

At the age of 25, in 1878, Bond began her theatrical career, creating the role of Cousin Hebe in Gilbert and Sullivan's H.M.S. Pinafore, which became an international success. After this, she created roles of increasing importance with the D'Oyly Carte Opera Company in a series of successful comic operas, including the title role in Iolanthe (1882), Pitti Sing in The Mikado (1885), Mad Margaret in Ruddigore (1887), Phoebe in The Yeomen of the Guard (1888), Tessa in The Gondoliers (1889) and others.

During the 1890s, she continued performing in the West End for several more years, while being courted by Lewis Ransome, a civil engineer. In 1897, at the age of 44, Bond married Ransome and left the stage. They were happily married for 25 years, moving to Nottinghamshire, where Bond lived the life of a country squire's wife. She also occasionally gave charity concerts and assisted amateur theatre companies. She survived her husband by twenty years, living to the age of 89.

== Life and career ==
=== Beginnings ===
Bond was born in Camden Town, London, the third of five children (and eldest daughter) born to John Bond Jr, a piano maker, and Elizabeth née Simson, a lawyer's daughter. Bond and her siblings were given a musical education, and her mother often took the children to see theatre. When Jessie Bond was a young girl, her family moved to Liverpool, where she grew up. At the age of ten, she played a Beethoven piano sonata in a concert. To help with family expenses, Bond taught music as a teenager. At the age of sixteen, she began to study singing, which she much preferred to teaching. The same year, at Hope Hall (now the Everyman Theatre) in Liverpool, she accompanied the music students of professor Isouard Praeger, her piano teacher. The next year, she made her own concert singing debut.

Bond's mother took her to see Ferdinand Alexis Schottländer (d. 1885), the director of a choral society in Liverpool, who she hoped would be able to help Bond's singing career. Schottländer was ten years older than Bond and had travelled, and the teenaged Bond became fascinated by him, breaking off her previous relationship. Under Schottländer's tutelage, Bond's voice developed rapidly. She gave her first public vocal performance in November 1869 at a concert of his pupils, singing "Ah! quel giorno" from Semiramide and a song by her teacher. She soon became the leading contralto soloist at the Seel Street Benedictine Church (now known as St. Peter's Catholic Church) in the same city. Her father's enquiries revealed that Schottländer was a "bad lot", and he forbade any engagement until Bond was older.

On 8 March 1870, by Bond's account, Schottländer abducted the 17-year-old Bond on her way to sing at a church service, took her to a friend's house and forced her to stay the night with him. He convinced her that she was "compromised" and that they must marry. The next day, she was taken to Manchester, where they were married. The marriage was a terrible experience for Bond, and she became pregnant and ill. "He ill-treated both my mind and my body, he denied me every comfort, often I had not even enough to eat. To add to my wretchedness, the inevitable baby was coming. ... He had been violently ill-treating me, I was a broken, pitiful creature." Her family persuaded her to leave him after ten months of marriage. Bond wrote that she contracted smallpox from the doctor who attended her, but she recovered. The baby, Sidney John Arthur Schottländer, was born on 7 May 1871 and died on 18 June 1871, six weeks later. His death certificate states the cause of death as syphilis. The couple lived separately for several years, and Bond finally divorced her husband in 1874. Bond stated in her divorce petition that she had been knowingly infected with a communicable disease by her husband.

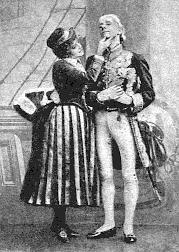
Bond as Cousin Hebe with Grossmith as Sir Joseph in H.M.S. Pinafore, 1887 revival

After leaving her husband, Bond continued to teach piano and was immediately back on stage singing oratorios, masses and other concerts near Liverpool, with a busy schedule throughout the early 1870s. She gave a recital at St. George's Hall, Liverpool, at the end of January 1871. In November 1871, Mr and Mrs Howard Paul's Benefit at the Queen's Hall, Liverpool, featured J. L. Toole, and "Miss Jessie Bond and Miss Pattie Laverne both sing several new ballads". In 1873, she was the contralto soloist in Mendelssohn's Elijah in Birkenhead and in Handel's Messiah in Liverpool. In 1875 at the Liverpool Institute, she sang in J. L. Hatton's Enchantress. She became friendly with the baritone Charles Santley, who advised her to move to London to study at the Royal Academy of Music. Bond did so, studying with Manuel García and then J. B. Welch, and she continued to sing concerts both in the provinces and in London. For example, in the summer of 1877, she appeared at the Queen's Theatre in London in at least three of the conductor Jules Rivière's promenade concerts and was widely seen throughout Britain into 1878. The impresario Richard D'Oyly Carte first heard her in a concert at St. George's Hall and suggested concert engagements for her.

=== H.M.S. Pinafore ===
In May 1878, Bond made her first appearance on the dramatic stage at the age of 25, creating the role of Cousin Hebe in W. S. Gilbert and Arthur Sullivan's H.M.S. Pinafore. The role had been written for a veteran performer, Mrs Howard Paul, but Gilbert and Sullivan were unhappy with Mrs. Paul's vocal abilities, which were deteriorating. Finally, with only about a week to go before opening night, Carte hired Bond to play Cousin Hebe. At this stage of her career, Bond was not comfortable with spoken dialogue, and so her character was written out, or given nothing to say, in several scenes. After opening night, however, a portion of the recitative was converted to spoken dialogue, and Bond would have dialogue in all of the remaining roles that she created. She quickly grew to enjoy character acting.

In December 1878, Bond created the part of Maria in After All!, composed by Alfred Cellier, when that companion piece was added to the bill with Pinafore. In late 1879, Bond travelled to America with Gilbert, Sullivan and D'Oyly Carte to give American audiences their first opportunity to see the authentic H.M.S. Pinafore, rather than the pirated versions that had sprung up in American theatres. While in New York City, she created the role of Edith in Gilbert and Sullivan's next opera, The Pirates of Penzance. This was followed by a US tour of Pinafore and Pirates. Just before the American tour, Bond had developed an abscess in her leg. This never fully healed and would be with her throughout her stage career. In her autobiography, she wrote:

The abscess in my ankle was painful and persistent.... Owing to faulty treatment and want of rest my ankle became perfectly stiff, as it is to this day. Of course, I said as little as possible about it, for even partial lameness would spoil my chances on the stage. I doubt if the management ever knew; the public certainly didn't; and those who saw me dancing and capering light-heartedly about the stage for twenty years little thought under what difficulties I did it, and the pain I often suffered.

In fact, the management knew about Bond's abscess, since Sullivan's diary records that both he and Gilbert visited her during her temporary incapacity, and Sullivan paid the doctor's bill.

=== Pirates to Iolanthe ===
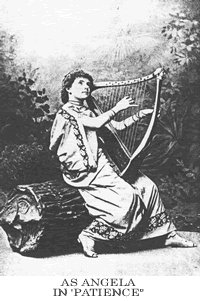
Bond as Lady Angela in Patience, 1881

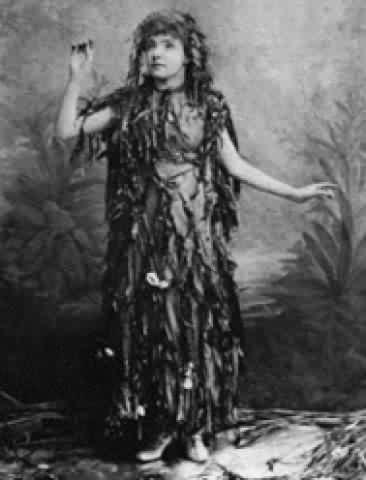
Bond as Iolanthe, 1882

Back in London, Bond continued to play Edith until Pirates ran its course in April 1881. One of Bond's sisters, Miriam "Neva" Bond (1854–1936), became a D'Oyly Carte Opera Company chorister for approximately twelve years, from 1880 to 1891. Neva created the role of Isabel in the London production of The Pirates of Penzance.

Bond's next role was Lady Angela in Patience (1881–82). She did not much like the role, writing later that she did not relate to the sentimental lady of luxury indulging in the aesthetic craze. By this time, Bond was becoming known to audiences and attracting the notice of young men. Having had such a bad experience with a man in the past, Bond ignored such attentions. One poem sent to her by an admirer ran in mock-Gilbertian style as follows (in part):

Whene'er I chance/A backward glance,/At times when, off my filbert
With you (my "mash!"),/I blew my cash/On Sullivan and Gilbert!
I loved you then/With all my pen/(My heart's amanuensis),
And folks who read/Sat up and said/"His love for her immense is!"
Nor were they wrong;/Your merry song —/You sing divinely, sweetly!
Your lively dance/And roguish glance/Had captured me completely!
I don't complain!/I'd still remain/A pris'ner now and ever!
From such a Bond/'Tis far beyond/My humble wish to sever!
Now, pray don't scold,/I know I'm bold,/But, still, I'm not a sinner. For,
Remember this,/I've known you, miss,/Since you were in a Pinafore!

After the company had moved into the new Savoy Theatre, Bond met the Prince of Wales on several occasions, who assisted her career, securing singing engagements for her.

Bond wrote of her next role, "It was like a dream come true when I saw my own name in the title role" of Iolanthe (1882–84). Bond's first entrance as Iolanthe was across a "stream". She wrote in her memoirs about a performance of Iolanthe: "Realism can be carried too far, as it was when one night a zealous property man said to me: 'It'll be just like the real thing to-night, Miss Bond. I've put some frogs into the water!' 'Then you'll just have to fish them out again,' I retorted, 'and the curtain won't go up until you do.' They had to catch those frogs in an inverted umbrella. Everybody got splashed and agitated, and the performance was delayed for some time." The critics praised Bond's portrayal of the title character: "Miss Jessie Bond... may be credited with all the grace, delicacy, and fascination we should expect from a fairy mother, and her singing of the really exquisite melody in the last scene was one of the most successful items in the entire opera."

Iolanthe was followed by Princess Ida (1884), in which Bond played the role of Melissa. Bond played the role of Constance in the first revival of The Sorcerer (1884–85). The role had originally been written for a soprano, and some of the music was transposed down to suit Bond's lower range and tessitura. Another feature of this revival was the pairing of Bond's character with that of Rutland Barrington's. The combination was so successful that in later Savoy operas, Bond and Barrington were generally paired.

=== The Mikado and Ruddigore ===
Bond next created the role of Pitti-Sing in The Mikado (1885–87), one of the "three little maids from school". Sometimes, inspiration for plot points in the Gilbert and Sullivan operas was provided by characteristics of the performers themselves. For instance, Gilbert noted in an interview that the fact that the female singers to be engaged for The Mikado, Leonora Braham, Bond, and Sybil Grey, were all of short stature inspired him to make them schoolgirls—three "little" maids—and to treat them as a closely linked trio throughout the work as much as possible. Bond, however, knew how to stand out on stage. During preparations for The Mikado, she persuaded the wardrobe mistress to make the obi of her costume twice as big as that of the other "little maids". She wrote: "I made the most of my big, big bow, turning my back to the audience whenever I got a chance, and waggling it. The gallery was delighted, but I nearly got the sack for that prank! However, I did get noticed, which was what I wanted."

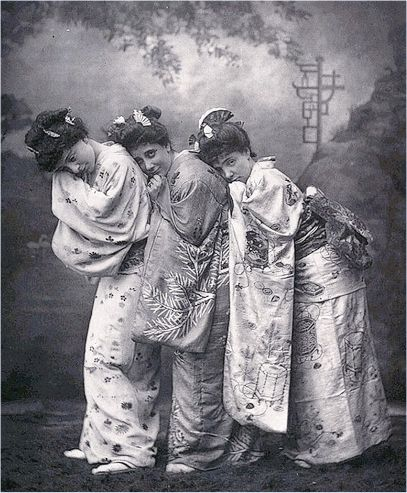
Grey, Braham and Bond in The Mikado

After seven years with D'Oyly Carte, and still earning money from private and concert singing engagements, Bond's salary had risen to the point where she was able to move into a better flat and hire a maid. Though she was happy with her success, Bond (somewhat like Sullivan) longed to devote herself to singing serious music. She wrote that when she was in a thoughtful mood, she would consider the following:

I had worked so hard at serious music, I had loved it so much and been so successful, that it was not without a pang that I gave it all up to sing little songs and choruses that were, after all, child's play to me. ...[O]ften my heart ached when I thought of those days when I lived in an atmosphere of music of the highest order, and could express my inmost self in it. ...[S]ometimes when I thought things over I felt how far I had fallen from that first austere ideal, and wished that fame and success could have come in a higher sphere.

During the run of The Mikado, Bond met Lewis Ransome, a young civil engineer from a wealthy Quaker family. He had just returned from America, and the two compared travel experiences. Ransome admitted to Bond that, after watching The Mikado, he had mentioned to his sister that he "liked the little one with the big sash best. So next day when she saw a photograph of you in a shop window she went in and bought it. She gave it to me and I have it now." Thus, despite Bond's aversion to romance, began a long friendship that led, twelve years later, to Bond's second marriage. Ransome, several years younger than Bond, proposed marriage on many occasions over the course of the relationship, but Bond told him that she would not marry while she continued on the stage. Over the years, the two spent many of Bond's days off (Sundays) relaxing together in the country.

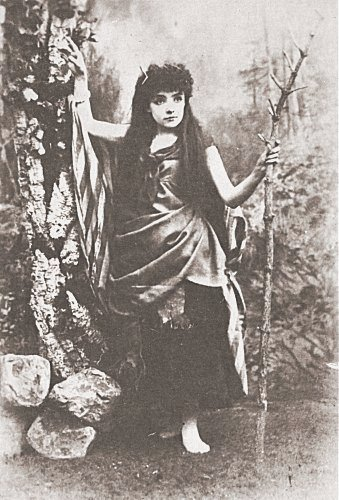
Bond as Mad Margaret in Ruddigore, 1887

Bond next created the role of Mad Margaret in Ruddigore (1887; originally spelt "Ruddygore"), which she regarded as her favourite of all the Gilbert and Sullivan roles, "for it gave me the chance to show what I really could do as an actress." The part was her largest to date, and Gilbert, Sullivan and Carte made her audition it for them to be sure that she could handle the responsibility. Bond recalled: "It was an awful ordeal. I saw the three white faces looming out of the darkness as they sat close together; criticizing me, talking me over, with cold managerial detachment. It nearly killed me. Perhaps it gave an added realism and abandon to my simulated madness, for indeed I was nearly mad with fear – but at any rate I came through triumphantly, they were all three of them delighted." She was particularly nervous on opening night. "I shook and tottered so much that Mad Margaret's staff was no mere adjunct, but an absolute necessity. Without it I should have fallen as I stood in the wings waiting to go on. Then some one gave me a push; I was there, on the stage, in the glare of the footlights, hundreds of eyes fixed on me, tier upon tier of dim white faces rising from floor to ceiling in the gloom. It was enough; I forgot myself, I was Mad Margaret and no one else. I made an immense success." Cellier and Bridgeman seconded this assessment:

There were two particularly noteworthy features in the performance of Ruddigore. First to be mentioned was the acting of Miss Jessie Bond in the part of 'Mad Margaret.' Among the host of her admirers few had given the popular Savoy soubrette credit for such great ability as a genuine comedy-actress, for never before had the opportunity been afforded her to display her latent talent—Jessie Bond's triumph came as a surprise to all.... So true to real life was the portrayal of Mad Margaret that Mr. Forbes Winslow, the famous authority on mental disorders, wrote a congratulatory letter to Miss Bond and inquired where she had found the model from which she had studied, and so faithfully copied the phases of insanity. No greater compliment could have been paid the actress.

Bond next appeared in the first revivals of H.M.S. Pinafore (1887–88), Pirates (1888), and The Mikado (1888) recreating her earlier roles. She had developed an enthusiastic following among the audiences at the Savoy Theatre. During this period, Bond also appeared in To the Death by fellow savoyard Rutland Barrington (1888) and Locked In (1889). For the revival of Pirates, Bond asked Gilbert if he would increase the size of the small role of Edith for her. Gilbert wrote her a letter that concludes:

I am writing such a particularly good part for you in the new piece that I should be distressed beyond measure if you should leave us. I've never said as much as this to any actor or actress before. I don't say it to induce you to play so insignificant a part as Edith, for if you left us now, and came back to us to play that part, I should be satisfied. But if you didn't play it, my calculations would be all upset, and I should lose a dear little lady for whom I have always had a very special regard.

=== Yeomen and The Gondoliers ===
With W. H. Denny in Yeomen, 1888

True to Gilbert's word, Bond's next original role was the important role of Phœbe Meryll in The Yeomen of the Guard (1888–89). Bond wrote, "My share in the most beautiful of all the Gilbert and Sullivan operas was delightfully easy and natural. When Gilbert gave it to me at the first reading he said, 'Here you are, Jessie, you needn't act this, it's you.'" Gilbert was even more nervous than usual on the first night of Yeomen and came backstage to give his best wishes to the cast. Bond wrote, "I am afraid he made himself a perfect nuisance behind the scenes, and did his best, poor fellow, to upset us all. These first nights were very hard on me... and nearly always my understudy was called upon to officiate on the second night of a play, while I lay exhausted in my bed. [In Yeomen], the curtain rises on Phœbe alone at her spinning wheel, and Gilbert kept fussing about ... until I was almost as demented as he was. At last I turned on him savagely. 'For Heaven's sake, Mr. Gilbert, go away and leave me alone, or I shan't be able to sing a note!' He gave me a final frenzied hug, and vanished."

In each of the new Gilbert and Sullivan operas, Bond's roles continued to grow larger and more challenging, until with Margaret, Phœbe, and Tessa in The Gondoliers (1889–91), Bond's roles were at least as important as any other female role. By the time The Gondoliers was in preparation, Gilbert felt that his regular principal cast members were becoming too demanding and that the precision and style of D'Oyly Carte productions could be maintained only if there were no "stars". He endeavoured to make the nine leading roles as co-equal as he could. Bond, aware of her importance to the company, declined to appear unless her salary was raised from twenty pounds to thirty pounds a week. Gilbert bitterly resisted the raise, but Bond prevailed: "I was the only one who asked for a rise, and Gilbert was furious with me. All the time we were rehearsing [The Gondoliers] he never spoke to me, and only acknowledged my existence by sometimes saying sneeringly: 'Make way for the High-Salaried Artiste!' ...Passing storms like this did occasionally ruffle the course of our friendship, but on the whole it flowed on deep and strong". During the run of The Gondoliers, Queen Victoria called for a royal command performance of the show at Windsor Castle. Bond wrote,

I quaked a little as we began our quartet "A Right-down Regular Royal Queen". But [this and Barrington's solo] numbers seemed to amuse the real Queen more than anything else in the opera, and, indeed, who could so well as she see the point of them? The very fact of her choosing this opera from all the others to be played before her shows how vivid was her sense of fun, and how truly British was her willingness to laugh at herself. There was ... only one encore ... [a]nd who do you suppose was singled out for that honour? Who but I who write this, little Jessie Bond ... for my song in the first act, 'When a Merry Maiden Marries.'

=== Last years on stage ===
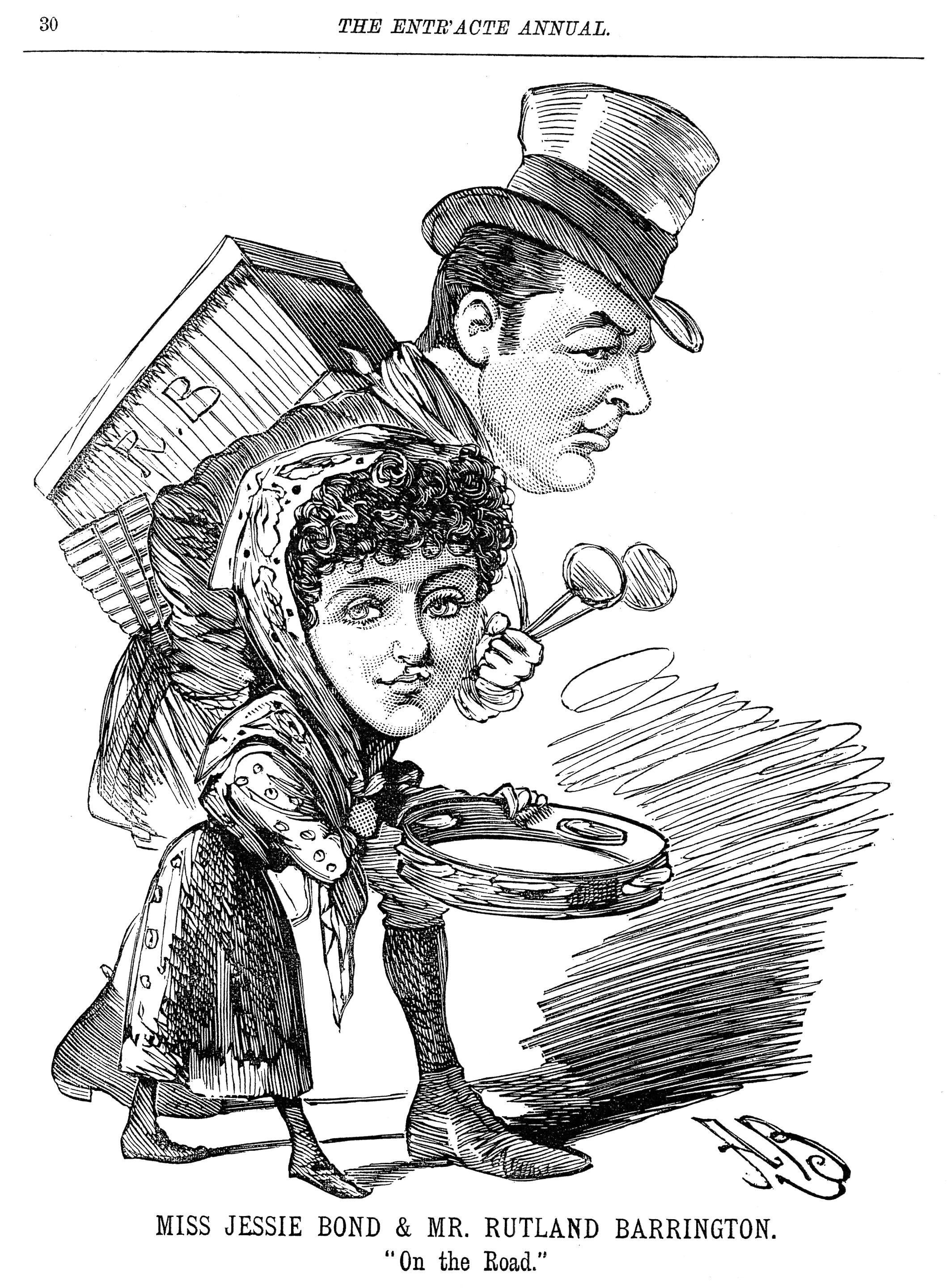
Bond and Barrington's 1891 duo act

After The Gondoliers closed, Gilbert and Sullivan were estranged for a time, and Carte hired Bond to play Chinna-Loofa in Dance, Desprez and Solomon's The Nautch Girl (1891). Although her salary continued to rise, she was less happy at the Savoy after Gilbert's departure. She took a three-month leave from the D'Oyly Carte organisation in August 1891, together with Rutland Barrington, performing a series of "musical duologues" and sketches, written mostly by Barrington and composed by Edward Solomon, on a provincial tour, where they received good notices and profits. Bond also did some of the writing. She passed up the opportunity to create a role in Gilbert's next opera, The Mountebanks at the Lyric Theatre (1892), as she was still under contract to Carte. She and Barrington returned to the Savoy in November, but Bond left the D'Oyly Carte organisation at the end of the run of The Nautch Girl in January 1892, as there was no role for her in the next Savoy opera, The Vicar of Bray. Bond was unwilling to accept the part offered to her in the next Savoy piece, Haddon Hall (1892).

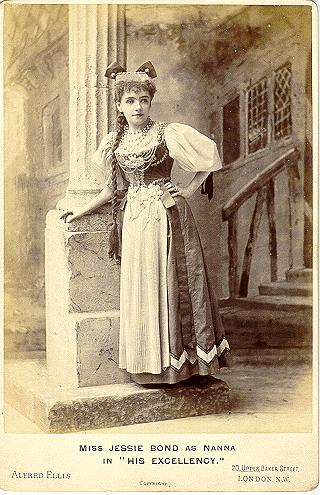
Bond as Nanna in His Excellency, 1894

Over the next few years, Bond had several engagements in London theatres, including in Ma mie Rosette (1892), Poor Jonathan (1893), Corney Courted (1893), a revival of Pickwick by Solomon and F. C. Burnand (1893) Miami (as Nelly O'Neil) at the Princess's Theatre, and others. She enjoyed good runs as Helen Tapeleigh in the musical comedy Go-Bang (1894) and Nanna in Gilbert and F. Osmond Carr's His Excellency (1894–95). In 1894, she also played in Wapping Old Stairs, by Stuart Robertson and Howard Talbot (with Courtice Pounds and Richard Temple), and Pick-me-up at the Trafalgar Square Theatre (with George Grossmith, Jr. and Letty Lind). During these years, Bond owned a Fox Terrier named Bob. She returned to the Savoy to play Pitti-Sing in the revivals of The Mikado that ran off and on from November 1895 to February 1897. When the revivals were over, Bond left the stage.

After he had first seen her perform in The Mikado in 1885, Bond's friendship with Lewis Ransome continued and deepened. Subject to an increasing number of short illnesses that prevented her from performing, and tiring of life in the theatre, Bond finally agreed to marry Ransome, and the couple wed in May 1897:

When I told Gilbert he was so angry that I don't think he ever quite forgave me; he would not accept my health as an excuse, he was unreasonable, as, alas, he often was! 'You are a little fool!' he said. 'I have often heard you say you don't like old women,' I retorted. 'I shall soon be old. Will you provide for me? Will Sir Arthur? Will Carte? No, of course you won't. Well, I am going to marry a man who will.'

Bond wrote of her feelings at the end of her last performance: "Twenty years of hard work, twenty years of fun and frolic and jolly companionship, twenty years of living in an atmosphere of tuneful nonsense, with the glare of the footlights in my eyes and the thunders of applause in my ears. How terribly I should miss it all! And domesticity, that all my life I had fled from, had caught me at last." Bond and Ransome spent three years in London, where Bond entertained her neighbours and theatrical friends with musical soirees and dinner parties. She also participated in charity benefits, such as a performance of H.M.S. Pinafore for the benefit of the families of soldiers and sailors, on 6 January 1900, in the village of Maiden Bradley. In 1900, the lease on Ransome's family business (Ransome and Co., later Ransome & Marles, a manufacturer of bearings and wood-working machinery) ran out, and it relocated to Newark, Nottinghamshire, to reduce costs. Bond and Ransome moved near the new factory to a large house in Farndon. During one of her illnesses, Gilbert wrote to her that "The Savoy is not itself without you."

=== Later life ===

Although Bond's life as a performer in the theatre had ended at age 44, she occasionally gave charity concerts thereafter. Unlike Bond's first marriage, her second was a happy one. Initially reluctant to leave London, Bond reported, "We entertained a good deal, and gave hunt lunches and shooting parties of our own, so my time was well filled up, and I missed London less than I could have believed." She founded and directed the Newark Amateur Dramatic Society, an amateur dramatic club, whose performances supported local charities. The couple also often visited London and did some travelling abroad.

Power, Braham, Bond and Gwynne at Sullivan's memorial in 1914

In 1912, and for some years afterwards, Bond played a significant role in developing the career of Donald Wolfit, whom she first saw perform when he was ten years old. Her first action on his behalf was to advise his concerned parents not to try to prevent him from pursuing a career on the stage. Together with George Power, Leonora Braham and Julia Gwynne, she was one of four artistes of the original D'Oyly Carte Opera Company who attended a reunion at the Savoy Hotel in 1914. The four then posed for a group photograph beside the Arthur Sullivan Memorial in the Victoria Embankment Gardens (see photo below). Her husband died in May 1922, after 25 years of marriage. Two years later, Bond moved out of the large house to Newark-on-Trent and later to Worthing, Sussex, and often visited London.

In the 1920s, Bond wrote several articles about her memories of Gilbert and Sullivan and her years with the D'Oyly Carte Opera Company for The Strand Magazine and The Gilbert & Sullivan Journal. Her autobiography, The Life and Reminiscences of Jessie Bond, the Old Savoyard, was published in 1930. In that book, she expressed great admiration particularly for Gilbert, but also for Sullivan and D'Oyly Carte, and she bemoaned overacting by performers in the "modern" era. In March 1930, the Gilbert and Sullivan Society invited the original three little maids to a reunion in London to celebrate the 45th anniversary of The Mikado.

In her last years, Bond entertained wounded World War I servicemen, playing the piano and singing at a south coast home for disabled soldiers and sailors. An obituary in the Evening Standard reported: "Every day for more than a year, until just recently, she was taken out in her wheelchair. After a breath of sea air ... she would always go into her favourite hotel for a drink and would often sit down at the piano and entertain the company with some of her old Gilbert and Sullivan tunes. She often used to go to a home for wounded ex-servicemen of the last war [and] would give an impromptu entertainment, playing and singing her old songs. She liked to go to parties and would always play and sing." The Worthing Gazette stated that Bond continued to be much loved in her later years, and people came to see her from all over Britain to pay homage in her old age. The Worthing Herald wrote: "Despite her great age, Miss Bond preserved a quick and active mind, and hated to be fussed over."

She died in 1942 at age 89 in Worthing.
