= After All! =

Comic opera by Frank Desprez and Alfred Cellier

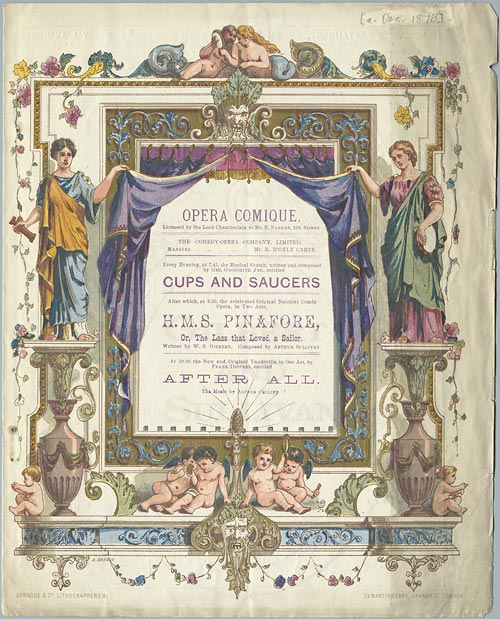
Original programme cover

After All! is a one-act comic opera with a libretto by Frank Desprez and music by Alfred Cellier. In its story, a man returns after many years abroad to seek his youthful sweetheart but finds that she has married his friend. Upon learning that she is no longer pleasant or attractive, he is grateful for his lucky escape and forgives his friend.

It was first performed at the Opera Comique under the management of Richard D'Oyly Carte, along with H.M.S. Pinafore and another short piece, Cups and Saucers, in December 1878; together with various operas, it ran until March 1880 and was revived in 1895–1897. It was given further revivals in London and on tour until at least 1909.

== Background and productions ==
After All! premiered as a Afterpiece at the Opera Comique under the management of Richard D'Oyly Carte, played after H.M.S. Pinafore, which was preceded by another short piece, Cups and Saucers, from December 1878 to February 1880. During its original run, in 1879, Richard D'Oyly Carte, W. S. Gilbert and Arthur Sullivan broke up the "Comedy Opera Company" that they had formed in 1877 to present the Gilbert and Sullivan operas. The former directors of that company staged a rival version Pinafore, along with After All!, but their versions were not as popular as Carte's. Later, After All! played with the D'Oyly Carte Opera Company children's Pinafore (and In the Sulks), from February to March 1880; with The Mikado from November 1895 to March 1896; with The Grand Duke from April to July 1896; with The Mikado from July to August 1896; and with The Yeomen of the Guard from May to June 1897. The piece was also performed on tour on numerous occasions until at least 1909, including a 1908 touring revival. The piece contains only four songs, all of which were separately published (by Metzler), and the autograph score is held by the British Library.

The fashion in the late Victorian era was to present long evenings in the theatre, and so producer Richard D'Oyly Carte accompanied his Savoy operas with companion pieces. W. J. MacQueen-Pope commented, concerning companion pieces such as curtain raisers:

This was a one-act play, seen only by the early comers. It would play to empty boxes, half-empty upper circle, to a gradually filling stalls and dress circle, but to an attentive, grateful and appreciative pit and gallery. Often these plays were little gems. They deserved much better treatment than they got, but those who saw them delighted in them. ... [They] served to give young actors and actresses a chance to win their spurs ... the stalls and the boxes lost much by missing the curtain-raiser, but to them dinner was more important.

== Synopsis ==
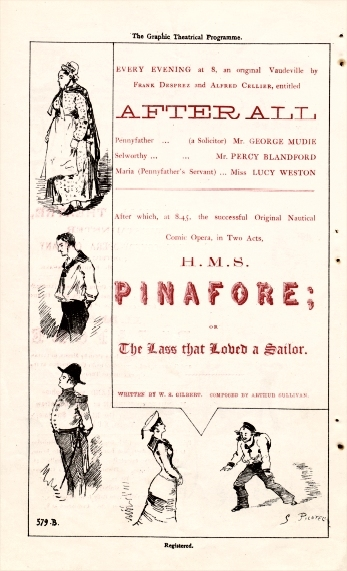
Programme for the unauthorised production of After All and H.M.S. Pinafore in 1879

Selworthy returns from many years in the Americas to seek his youthful sweetheart Perdita, and calls upon his old pal Pennyfather only to discover that Perdita is now Mrs. Pennyfather. He is heartbroken, but on learning from his friend what a henpecking, overbearing and overweight woman his sweetheart has now become, realises that he has had a lucky escape and that he really can forgive Pennyfather After All!

== Song list ==
- No. 1. True, True Love! – Selworthy
- No. 2. The Solicitor's Song: Up A Little Early – Pennyfather
- No. 3. It's Missus – Maria
- No. 4. Strictly Proper – Pennyfather and Selworthy

== Roles and original cast ==
- Pennyfather – Rutland Barrington
- Selworthy – Richard Temple
- Maria – Jessie Bond
- Offstage voice – J. Hervey

The offstage voice was originally played by Jennie Sullivan, Arthur Sullivan's cousin under the name J. Hervey. The role is not mentioned after the first few weeks or months of the run. Jessie Bond in her autobiography mentions her spoonerism "The missus is having such a cow with the rabman", which comes from this piece.

After Bond left for America in 1879, Julia Gwynne took over the role of Maria. C. H. Workman played Pennyfeather in the 1895–1897 revivals. Emmie Owen played Maria in the 1895–1896 revivals. Jones Hewson played Selworthy in the 1895–1897 revivals.

== Sources ==
- Rollins, Cyril; R. John Witts (1962). The D'Oyly Carte Opera Company in Gilbert and Sullivan Operas: A Record of Productions, 1875–1961. Michael Joseph.
- Stedman, Jane W. (1996). W. S. Gilbert, A Classic Victorian & His Theatre. Oxford University Press. ISBN 0-19-816174-3.
