= The Spectre Knight =

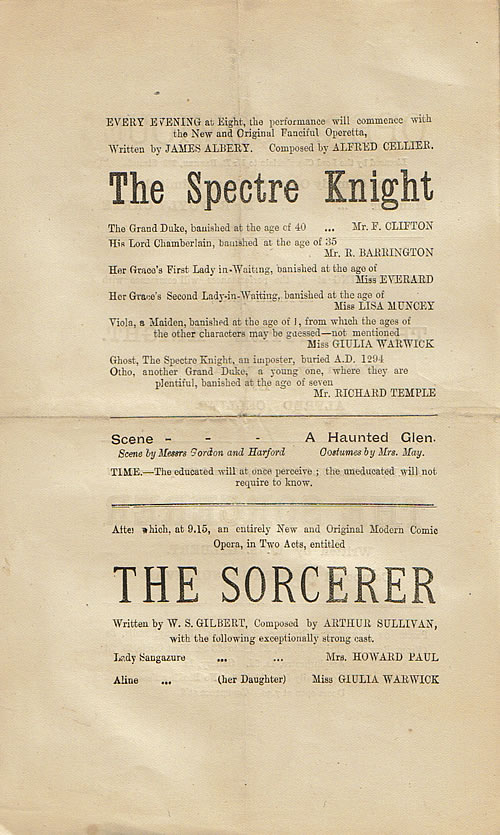
Page from 1878 theatre programme

The Spectre Knight is a one-act "fanciful operetta" with a libretto by James Albery and music by Alfred Cellier. It was first performed on 9 February 1878 at the Opera Comique by the Comedy Opera Company (the precursor to the D'Oyly Carte Opera Company) as a companion piece to The Sorcerer. The piece continued to run until 23 March 1878 and was revived by the company from 28 May 1878 to 10 August 1878 as a companion piece to H.M.S. Pinafore. The piece had a run in New York in 1880 and was toured by the D'Oyly Carte Opera Company in Britain and America.

No libretto appears to have been published. A copy of the vocal score, published by Metzler, is in British Library at F.739. The vocal score contains no dialogue, although it has a synopsis of the plot. The licence copy of the libretto is in Lord Chamberlain's collection at Add. MS. 53199, Play no. H, Jan–Feb 1878.

== Background ==
The fashion in the late Victorian era was to present long evenings in the theatre, and so producer Richard D'Oyly Carte preceded his Savoy operas with curtain raisers such as The Spectre Knight. W. J. MacQueen-Pope commented, concerning such curtain raisers:

This was a one-act play, seen only by the early comers. It would play to empty boxes, half-empty upper circle, to a gradually filling stalls and dress circle, but to an attentive, grateful and appreciative pit and gallery. Often these plays were little gems. They deserved much better treatment than they got, but those who saw them delighted in them. ... [They] served to give young actors and actresses a chance to win their spurs ... the stalls and the boxes lost much by missing the curtain-raiser, but to them dinner was more important.

The Spectre Knight is a particularly long curtain-raiser, with sixteen songs, and running over an hour.

== Synopsis ==
- Scene - A Haunted Glen.
- Time - The educated will perceive; the uneducated will not require to know.

The eccentric Grand Duke, with his daughter Viola and the remains of his court, has been banished and live in a lonely glen where they try to keep up the semblance of their former grandeur. Viola has known no other life and never seen another human being except those of their party. She is thus greatly delighted when the Duke's nephew Otho arrives in the glen disguised as a friar. Otho falls in love with his cousin at first sight, and having learned from her of the legend of the spectre knight who is supposed to haunt the glen, he appears in the disguise of the ghost. He wins Viola's heart and finally introduces himself to her as Otho who has just overthrown the usurper of her father's throne. He promises that they can all go home again. The Duke consents to Otho's union with Viola, and all ends happily.

== Musical numbers ==
- Overture
- No. 1 - Recit. - Chamberlain -- "Potatoes a pound and onions a rope..."
- No. 2 - Recit. - Duke and Chamberlain -- "What letters have you brought from the Palace?"
- No. 3 - Duke and Chamberlain -- "Your Grace, I am an eligible Count..."
- No. 4 - Quartet - Ladies in Waiting, Chamberlain and Duke -- "You may talk, you may talk, you may scold..."
- No. 5 - Otho -- "Said Cupid to me, come hither to see..."
- No. 6 - Vocal Waltz - Princess -- "I am free, I am free, for my labour is done..."
- No. 7 - Recit. and Trio - Otho, Viola and 1st. Lady -- "Pardon me, madam, I've a word to say to this young lady..."
- No. 8 - Viola and Otho -- "The little goldfinch in her nest is but a homely bird at best..."
- No. 8(bis) - Replica of Duet -- "You should not be long alone..."
- No. 9 - Recit and Quartet - Viola, 1st. Lady, Chamberlain and Duke -- "Fill up, and let us drink to one another..."
- No. 10 - Round - Viola, 1st. Lady, Chamberlain and Duke -- "Too-whit, too-whoo, too-whoo, too-whit..."
- No. 10b -- Melodrame
- No. 11 & 12 - Entrance and Song of the Spectre - Otho -- "I only mix with ghosts well known..."
- No. 13 - Scena - Viola, 1st. & 2nd. Lady, Chamberlain, Duke, Otho & Pages -- "I am here... close at hand... at your will..."
- No. 14 -- Banquet Music
- No. 15 - Viola -- "I have been taught that I should love my father and my friends..."
- No. 16 - Finale -- "He has come to our undoing..."

== Roles and cast ==
- The Grand Duke (banished at the age of 40) (bass) – Fred Clifton
- The Lord Chamberlain (banished at the age of 35) (baritone) – Rutland Barrington
- 1st lady in waiting (banished at the age of --) (mezzo-soprano) – Harriett Everard
- 2nd lady in waiting (banished at the age of --) (soprano) – Lisa Muncey
- Lady Viola (banished at the age of 1) (soprano) – Giulia Warwick
- Ghost ("The Spectre Knight" - an Imposter, buried A.D. 1294) (bass-baritone) – Richard Temple
- The Spectre Knight (banished at the age of 7) (bass-baritone) – Richard Temple

During the run of The Sorcerer, Barrington was replaced by F. Talbot, Muncey by Miss Hervey (possibly Rose Hervey), and Warwick by Laura Clement. When revived with Pinafore, the cast was Clifton, Talbot, Everard, Muncey, Clement, and Temple. During the run, Muncey was replaced again by Hervey and Clement by Alice Burville.
