= Pattie Laverne =

English singer and actress

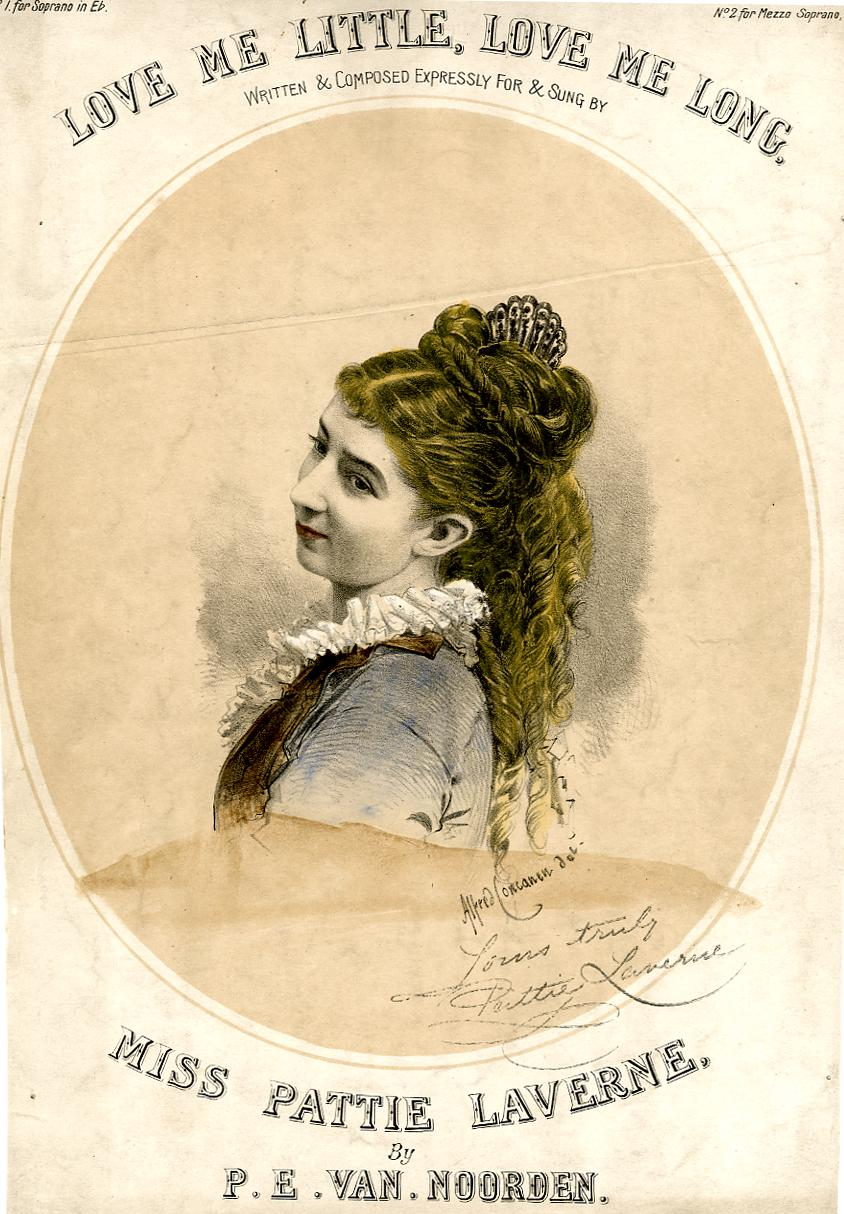

Background information
- Died: 24 April 1916
- Genres: opéra bouffe

Pattie Laverne (died 24 April 1916) was an English singer and actress, playing leading roles in opéra bouffe.

== Life ==
Laverne was born in London, and was initially a concert soprano singer, first appearing in 1871 at the Hanover Square Rooms, and later at St James's Hall and in Manchester at the Free Trade Hall. She first appeared on stage later that year in Preston, in the title role of The Grand Duchess by Jacques Offenbach.

In 1872 she became a member of the company of Opera Comique in London; in October of that year she played Dindorette in L'œil crevé by Hervé. A reviewer in The Era (26 October 1872) wrote that she had "a very decided talent for sprightly acting.... [T]hroughout the opera Miss Laverne was as piquant and sparkling as possible, and added greatly to the success of the piece."

During the 1872–1873 season she took leading roles at Opera Comique in The Bohemians and Kissi-Kissi; during the 1873–1874 season she was Clairette in La fille de Madame Angot by Charles Lecocq.

Further leading roles were in Happy Hampstead by Richard D'Oyly Carte, Giroflé-Girofla by Lecocq, and Trainette in Pom by Procida Bucalossi. She took the title role in Nell Gwynne by Alfred Cellier in 1876 at the Prince's Theatre, Manchester. In 1876 she appeared on tour as Clairette in La fille de Madame Angot, with great success, and toured in 1877 as Boulotte in Barbe-bleue by Offenbach.
