= Arthur Sullivan Memorial =

Memorial in London

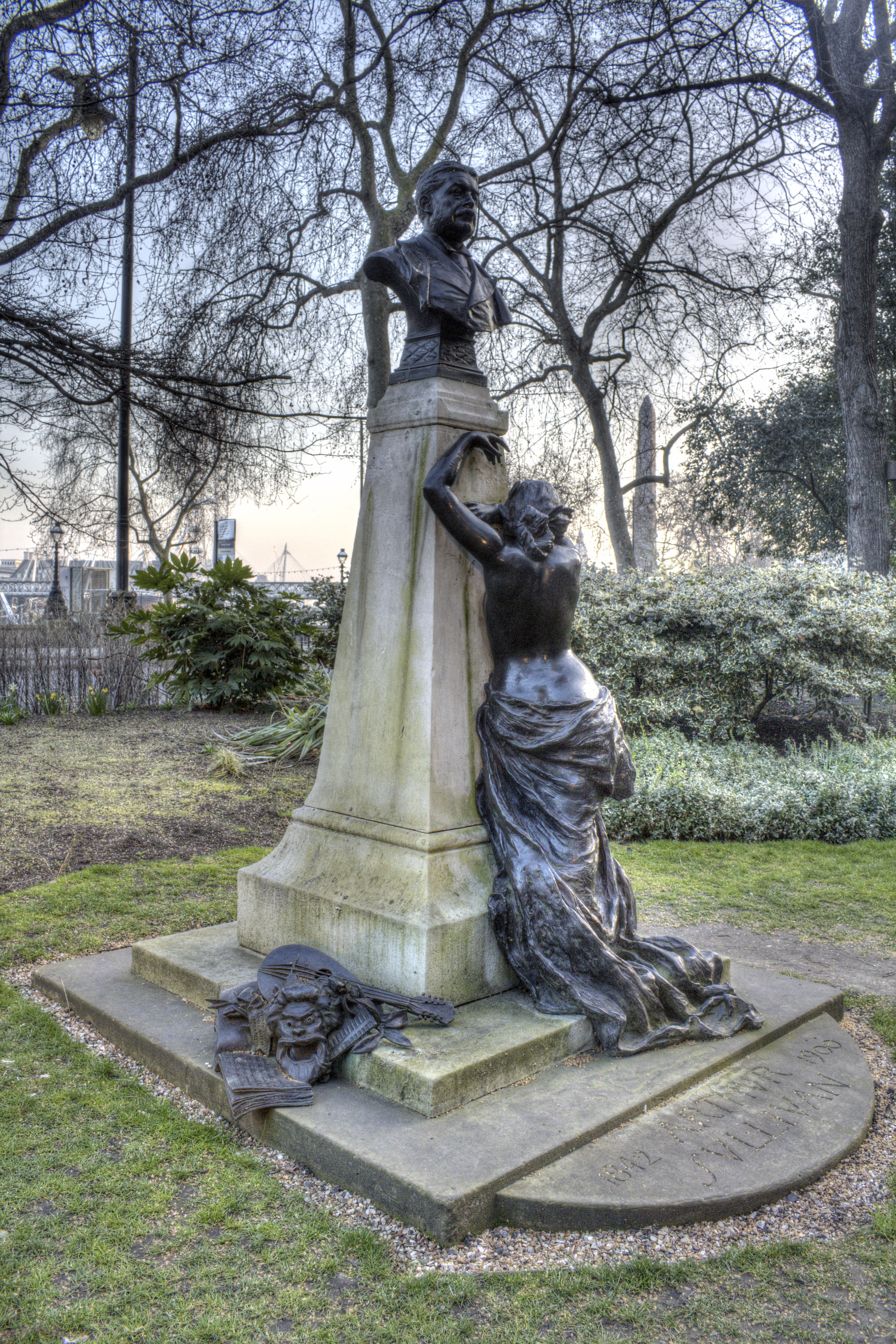
- "The most erotic statue in London"
- Artist: William Goscombe John
- Completion date: 1903
- Type: Sculpture
- Medium: bronze and granite
- Subject: Arthur Sullivan
- Location: London; 51.509491°N 0.119629°W

Listed Building – Grade II
- Official name: Sir Arthur Sullivan Memorial
- Designated: 24 February 1958
- Reference no.: 1238072

The Memorial to Arthur Sullivan by William Goscombe John stands in Victoria Embankment Gardens in the centre of London. It was designated a Grade II listed structure in 1958.

== History ==
Sir Arthur Seymour Sullivan (13 May 1842 – 22 November 1900) was an English composer best known for his enduring operatic collaborations with the dramatist W. S. Gilbert. Prior to his death in 1900, Sullivan had expressed a wish to be buried with other members of his family in Brompton Cemetery in West London. At the command of Queen Victoria, he was instead interred in St. Paul's Cathedral. In 1903, a memorial to him was raised in Victoria Embankment Gardens, close to the site of the Savoy Theatre where many of his and Gilbert's comic operas premiered.

Why, O nymph, O why display
Your beauty in such disarray?
Is it decent, is it just,
To so conventional a bust?

— rhyme inspired by "the most erotic statue in London"

The sculptor was Sir William Goscombe John RA. John modelled the head and shoulders bust in bronze, (Note: John presented a copy of the bronze to the Royal Academy of Music.) subsequently adding the figure of a disconsolate woman, which he had sculpted in Paris in 1890–1899. Sources variously describe the figure as representing "Grief" or the Greek muse of music, Euterpe.

The statue has been described as "the most erotic in London" and inspired a rhyme on that theme (see box). John Whitlock Blundell and Roger Hudson, in their study The Immortals: London's finest statues, note the memorial's "fin de siècle spirit".

== Description ==
George Power, Leonora Braham, Jessie Bond and Julia Gwynne at the memorial in 1914

The bust of Sullivan is in bronze and stands on a pedestal of granite. A bronze figure of a woman weeping, her upper body nude and her lower body covered in drapery, leans, as if pressing her body in her grief, against the plinth. Pevsner describes the Art Deco style of the memorial as "in the Père Lachaise manner”. The plinth also carries lines from Gilbert and Sullivan's 1888 opera The Yeomen of the Guard: "Is life a boon? / If so, it must befall / That Death, whene'er he call, / Must call too soon." The lines are repeated in the bronze sculpture at the base, which depicts an open book of music, one of the masks of Comedy and Tragedy, and a mandolin. The pedestal is fronted by a semi-circular stone bearing Sullivan's name and dates of birth and death. The memorial is a Grade II listed structure.

== Sources ==
- Blundell, Joe Whitlock; Hudson, Roger (1998). The Immortals: London's finest statues. London: The Folio Society. OCLC 50481074.
- Bradley, Simon; Pevsner, Nikolaus (2003). London 6: Westminster. The Buildings of England. New Haven, US and London: Yale University Press. ISBN 978-0-300-09595-1. OCLC 493040520.
- Darke, Jo (1991). The Monument Guide to England and Wales: A National Portrait in Bronze and Stone. London: MacDonald and Co. ISBN 978-0-356-17609-3. OCLC 24698831.
