= Philip Abraham (writer) =

English-Jewish writer and educator

- Born: 1803
- Died: December 17, 1890 (aged 86–87); London, United Kingdom
- Resting place: Balls Pond Road Cemetery
- Children: Leonora Braham (daughter)
- Writing career
- Pen name: P. A.

Philip Abraham (1803 – December 17, 1890) was an English-Jewish writer and educator.

== Biography ==
Philip Abraham was born into a prominent Jewish family affiliated with London's Western Synagogue. In 1849, he assumed the role of Headmaster at the National Hebrew School in Birmingham. After several years he relocated to London, where he worked as a private instructor in languages and Judaic studies, as well as Secretary of the West London Synagogue.

Abraham regularly contributed poetry and articles to the Jewish press, including The Jewish Chronicle. Among his publications were The Autobiography of a Jewish Gentleman (1860); Autumn Gatherings, a collection of prose and poetry (London, 1866); and Ha-Nistarot veha-Niglot ('The Secret and Revealed Things'), or Curiosities of Judaism: Facts, Opinions, Anecdotes, and Remarks Relative to the Hebrew Nation (London, 1879).

His daughter, Leonora Braham, was an opera singer and actress famous for originating several of the Gilbert and Sullivan soprano roles.

== Selected publications ==
- The Autobiography of a Jewish Gentleman. London. 1860.
- Autumn Gatherings, Being a Collection of Prose and Poetry. London: J. Wertheimer and Co. 1866.
- Ha-Nistarot veha-Niglot / Curiosities of Judaism: Facts, Opinions, Anecdotes, and Remarks Relative to the Hebrew Nation. London: Wertheimer, Lea and Co. 1879.
