= Julia Gwynne =

English opera singer and actress (1856–1934)

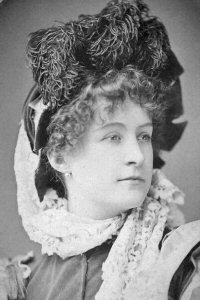
Julia Gwynne as Edith in The Pirates of Penzance

Julia Gwynne (1856 – 10 June 1934) was an English opera singer and actress best remembered for her performances with the D'Oyly Carte Opera Company from 1879 to 1883. She married producer George Edwardes.

== Life and career ==
Gwynne was born Julia Lavinia Putney at Marylebone, London, England in 1856 to David Putney and his wife, who owned the 'Black Boy' public house in Hampstead.

=== Early career ===
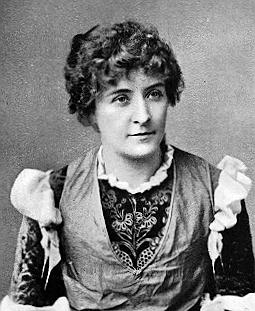
Julia Gwynne in about 1880

George Edwardes, later Gwynne's husband, was a manager for Richard D'Oyly Carte at the Opera Comique and later Carte's managing director of the Savoy Theatre. He brought Gwynne with him in 1879 to join the chorus in D'Oyly Carte's company in Gilbert and Sullivan's hit opera H.M.S. Pinafore. Gwynne's sister, actress Emma Gwynne (born Emma Putney), also sang in Iolanthe with Gwynn.

During Pinafore, Gwynne was called before the stage manager, Richard Barker, for laughing on stage during a performance. Despite her protest that it was only her "natural amiable expression," she was fined half a crown. Gwynne then played Maria in Frank Desprez and Alfred Cellier's companion piece, After All! from 1879–80, when Jessie Bond travelled to New York City to create the role of Edith in the American production of The Pirates of Penzance. When Pirates received its London premiere in April 1880, Gwynne created the role of Edith there. Bond returned in July to play Edith, and Gwynne switched to the smaller role of Kate and also played the role of Mrs. Liverby in the new curtain raiser, In the Sulks, by Desprez and Cellier.

Gwynne created the part of Lady Saphir in the next Gilbert and Sullivan opera, Patience, which opened in April 1881, and she played Mrs. Liverby when In the Sulks was part of the programme. She also played the role of Lady Melusine in Gilbert's Broken Hearts at a benefit performance at the Savoy in 1882 and again in 1885. Gwynne next created the role of Leila in Iolanthe in 1882 but left the D'Oyly Carte Opera Company in January 1883.

=== Later years ===
George Power, Leonora Braham, Jessie Bond and Gwynne at Sullivan's memorial in 1914

Gwynne then created the part of Dmitri in Herman Charles Merivale's adaptation of Sardou's Fédora at the Haymarket Theatre in May 1883. In the summer of 1883, she returned to the Savoy Theatre, playing Leila in Iolanthe again. After that, it appears that she left D'Oyly Carte for the last time. Although musical director Francois Cellier described her as the "life and soul" of the D'Oyly Carte Opera Company, stage manager Richard Barker continued to fine Gwynne for laughing on stage or for unauthorised costume augmentations. She joked with W. S. Gilbert that the Savoy Theatre was "built out of her fines."

Gwynne's marriage to Edwardes on 9 July 1885 was opposed by Gwynne's Protestant mother, as Edwardes was a Roman Catholic. However, Gwynne converted to Catholicism, and the marriage went ahead at Maiden Lane Roman Catholic church. Edwardes went on to have great success in his own right as a theatrical impresario at the Gaiety Theatre, London and other West End theatres, first producing the theatre's musical burlesques and then virtually inventing the genre of Edwardian musical comedy. Ironically, Gwynne's roles outside of those with the D'Oyly Carte organisation appear to have been in legitimate theatre rather than musical theatre. She continued to act until about 1887, performing at the Haymarket Theatre in 1883–84, including in Richard Brinsley Sheridan's comedy, The Rivals, as Lucy, and in The Bachelors, an adaptation from the German by Robert Williams Buchanan and Hermann Vezin. Gwynne retired from the stage following the birth of her daughter (Dorothy) and son (D'Arcy).

Together with George Power, Jessie Bond and Leonora Braham, she was one of four artistes of the original D'Oyly Carte Opera Company who attended a reunion at the Savoy Hotel in 1914. The four then posed for a group photograph beside the Arthur Sullivan Memorial in the Victoria Embankment Gardens.

Gwynne died in London on 10 June 1934.
