= Rutland Barrington =

British opera singer and actor, born 1853

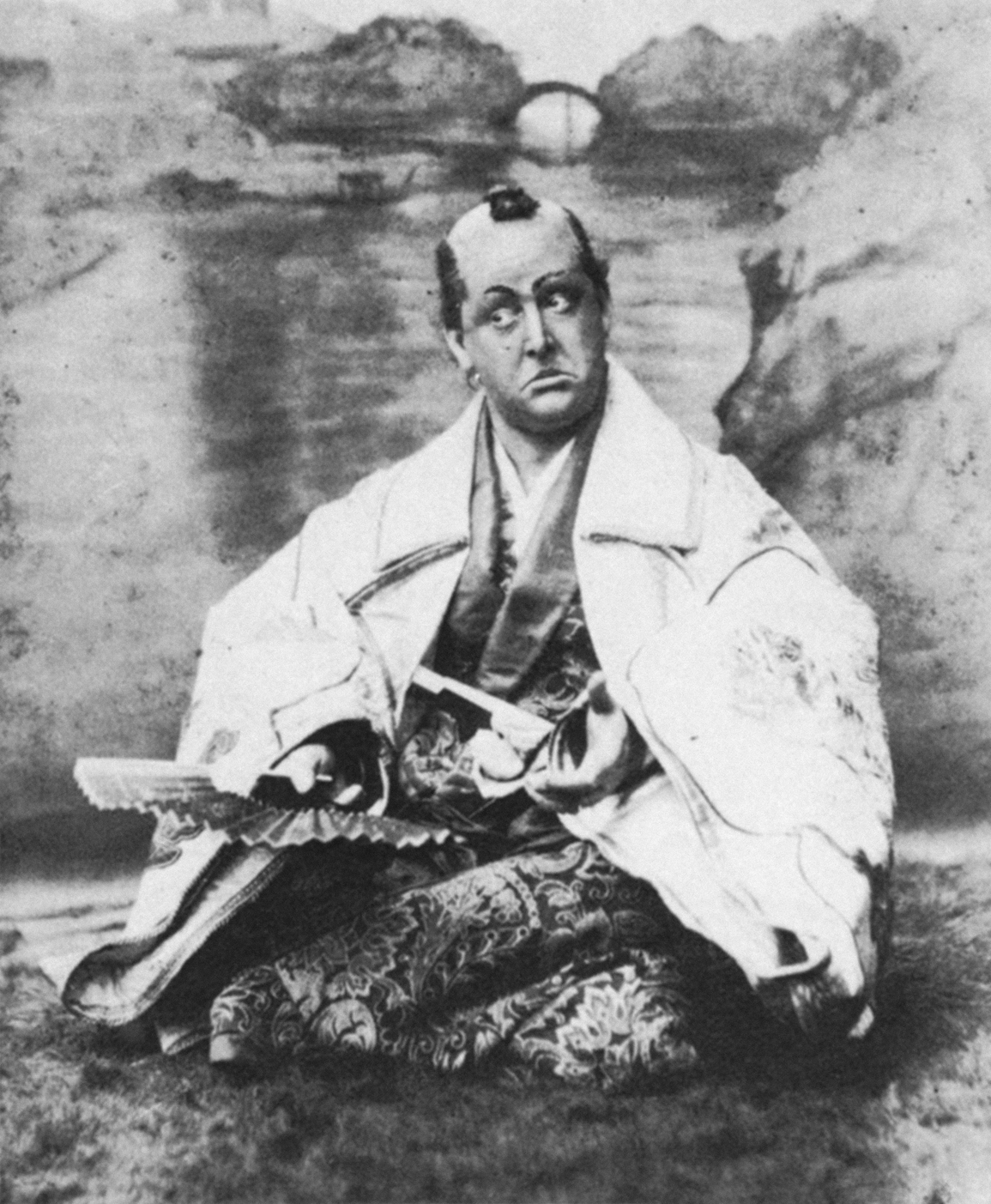
Barrington as Pooh Bah in The Mikado, 1885

Rutland Barrington (15 January 1853 – 31 May 1922) was an English singer, actor, comedian, Edwardian musical comedy star and playwright. Best remembered for originating the lyric baritone roles in the Gilbert and Sullivan operas from 1877 to 1896, his performing career spanned more than four decades. He also wrote at least a dozen works for the stage.

After two years with a comic touring company, Barrington joined Richard D'Oyly Carte's opera company in 1877 and, over the next two decades, created a number of memorable comic opera roles, including Captain Corcoran in H.M.S. Pinafore (1878), the Sergeant of Police in The Pirates of Penzance (1880), and Pooh Bah in The Mikado (1885), among many others in the Savoy operas. Failing in an 1888 attempt to become a theatrical manager, Barrington refocused his energies on acting and writing plays.

Beginning in 1896 and continuing for ten years, Barrington played in a series of very successful musical comedies under the management of George Edwardes at Daly's Theatre, specialising in comic portrayals of pompous rulers or other persons of authority. One of the most popular features of his performances was his insertion of topical songs, or verses of songs, into these musical comedies. After leaving Daly's he continued to appear in musical comedy roles and performed in music hall. He also essayed a few Shakespeare and other dramatic roles and appeared in a few silent films. His career ended in 1918, after which he suffered a stroke and lived the last few years of his life in poverty.

== Life and career ==
Barrington was born George Rutland Fleet at Penge, England, the fourth son of John George Fleet (1818–1902), a wholesale dealer in London importing goods from the colonies. His mother was the former Esther Faithfull (1823–1908) of Headley, Surrey, England. He was educated at Headley rectory and then at the Merchant Taylors' School in London. His six brothers included the Indologist John Faithfull Fleet (1847–1917), Vice-Admiral Henry Louis Fleet (1850–1923), The Reverend Ferdinand Francis Fleet (1857–1940) and actor Duncan James Fleet (1860–1909). He also had two sisters, one named Esther (one boy and one girl died in infancy). Barrington was employed in a bank for eighteen months as a young man, but had no enthusiasm for such work, as he had ambitions to be an actor. Barrington's father did not want his son to go on the stage and forbade him to do so until he came of age. His aunt, the activist and dramatic reader Emily Faithfull, helped him to make his first connections in the theatre. Barrington was a keen football player in the mid-1870s and played for the original Crystal Palace FC.

In 1880, Barrington married Ellen Louisa "Louie" Jane Stainer (1851–1922), from Woolwich in Kent, the daughter of William Stainer and the former Lucy Mary Wheeler. Barrington and his wife had no children.

=== Early career; joining D'Oyly Carte's company ===
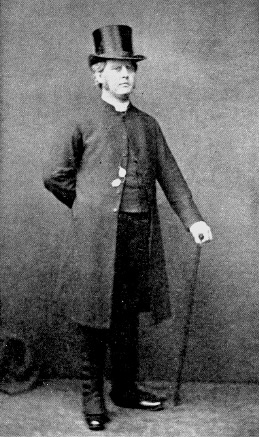
Barrington as Dr Daly in The Sorcerer, 1877

Barrington adopted his stage name by 1874 and made his professional debut with Henry Neville's company at the Olympic Theatre that year, playing the role of Sir George Barclay in Tom Taylor's Lady Clancarty, and then in The Ticket-of-Leave Man (by Taylor) and as LaFleur in The Two Orphans, among others. In July 1875, Barrington was playing Jules Frantz in Lessons in Harmony at St. George's Hall, London. A review in The Era reviewed the young actor's performance: "A good figure and expressive face were known to be among his advantages, but it was, perhaps, not suspected that he was a capital vocalist, a skilled musician, and an actor of remarkable ease and animation." Later that year, he was hired to appear in the touring company of Mr and Mrs Howard Paul. The company played a hectic schedule of entertainments.

In 1877 the producer Richard D'Oyly Carte approached Mrs Paul to play the part of Lady Sangazure in the new Gilbert and Sullivan opera, The Sorcerer, which he was presenting. She accepted, provided her 24-year-old protégé, Barrington, was given a part, and he was cast in the role of Dr Daly, the vicar. When he auditioned before W. S. Gilbert, the young actor questioned his own suitability for comic opera, but Gilbert, who required that his actors play their sometimes-absurd lines in all earnestness, explained the casting choice: "He's a staid, solid swine, and that's what I want."

In his 1908 autobiography, Barrington repeats a line from a first night review of his performance as Dr Daly in The Sorcerer: "Mr Barrington is wonderful. He always manages to sing one-sixteenth of a tone flat; it's so like a vicar." Barrington went on to say that producer Richard D'Oyly Carte later asked him, "[W]hat's the matter? ... some one has just come out of the stalls to tell me you are singing in tune. It will never do." Barrington wrote that "This pleased me so much that I have never sung flat since, except, of course, when I wished". Several contemporaries did find Barrington's singing occasionally flat, including Francois Cellier. Many years later, in her memoir, Ellaline Terriss wrote: "[D]ear old Rutland scarcely ever did sing in tune – but how grand he was. ... He had a beautifully clear diction and a marvellous sense of timing – and was one of the finest singers of the then popular topical songs that our stage ever knew." Percy Hetherington Fitzgerald wrote of Barrington in his 1899 book, The Savoy Opera, "His peculiar tranquil or impassive style has always exactly suited the characters allotted to him, and it would now be difficult to imagine a Savoy opera without him. However, Barrington's performance as Dr Daly impressed the critics and audiences, and he won a permanent place in D'Oyly Carte's company.

=== Pinafore to Ruddigore ===
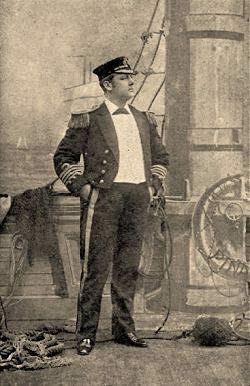
Playing Corcoran in H.M.S. Pinafore, revival

From 1877 to 1896, except for a foray into the business of theatrical management in 1888–89, Barrington remained with the D'Oyly Carte Opera Company, creating comic lyric baritone roles in all of Gilbert and Sullivan's new operas with the exception of The Yeomen of the Guard (1888). In 1878, he created the role of Lord Chamberlain in Albery and Cellier's curtain raiser, The Spectre Knight, played the Counsel for the Plaintiff in the revival of Trial by Jury, and created the role of Captain Corcoran in Gilbert and Sullivan's first smash hit, H.M.S. Pinafore. Barrington was a big man, which led to one of Gilbert's famous quips in a rehearsal for Pinafore. Gilbert asked Barrington to sit "pensively" on one of the ship's skylights. Barrington lowered himself into position, and the hastily sewn set piece collapsed under his weight. Gilbert remarked, "No, that's ex-pensively."

Barrington also created the role of Pennyfather in Desprez and Cellier's curtain raiser, After All! (1878). Barrington played Mr. Cox in Carte's revival of Cox and Box (1879) and created the role of the Sergeant of Police in The Pirates of Penzance in London (1880). Barrington was proud that the Sergeant's song generally received two encores. Eventually, he asked Gilbert to write an "encore verse" for the song. Gilbert replied that "encore" means "sing it again." Also around this time, Barrington's short play entitled Quid Pro Quo, written with Cunningham Bridgeman and composed by Wilfred Bendall, was first produced.

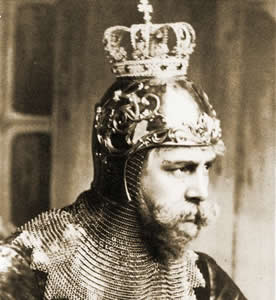
Playing Hildebrand in Princess Ida, 1884

The next role that Barrington created was Archibald Grosvenor in Patience (1881). Casting the large Barrington as the "perfect" and "infallible" incarnation of manly beauty mirrored a joke in Gilbert's earlier A Sensation Novel, in which he cast the large, ungainly Corney Grain, in a similar role. This was followed by the role of Earl Mountararat in Iolanthe (1882; he also appeared in Margate, Kent in an 1882 Christmas pantomime of Robin Hood written by George Thorne), and King Hildebrand in Princess Ida (1884). This role was Barrington's least favourite of the series, and he attributed Ida's relatively short run, at least in part, to the lack of prominence of this role in the opera. During the run of Princess Ida, a comedy written by Barrington and called Bartonmere Towers was first presented at a matinee.

After Princess Ida closed, Barrington reprised his role of Dr Daly and also played the Learned Judge in the revival of The Sorcerer and Trial (1884—over the years, Barrington frequently played the Judge in D'Oyly Carte's and various "benefit" performances of Trial). He also played Dr Dozey in Sydney Grundy's The Silver Shield (1885). In 1885, he created his most famous role, that of Pooh-Bah in The Mikado. The Theatre's review was typical of the critics' unanimous praise: "The Pooh-Bah of Mr. Barrington is a masterpiece of pompous stolidity – nothing could possibly be better of its kind – and this popular comedian provided his many admirers with an agreeable surprise by singing every note of the music allotted to him in perfect tune." In June 1885, he played together with Eric Lewis (Grossmith's understudy) in an afternoon "musical dialogue," Mad to Act, with words by Barrington and music by Wilfred Bendall, at the Japanese Village in Knightsbridge.

With Jessie Bond as Despard and Margaret, 1887

Next, Barrington created the role of Sir Despard Murgatroyd in Ruddigore and then reprised his original roles in revivals of Pinafore, Pirates and The Mikado in (1887–88). During rehearsals for Ruddigore, and after discussions with other cast members on the subject, Barrington complained to Gilbert about the guests that Gilbert frequently invited to rehearsals, saying that he didn't wish to be taught the stage business "before a row of ...strangers." Gilbert forgave Barrington for the outburst and even discontinued the invitations. However, if anyone sat in the stalls during later rehearsals awaiting their cue, Gilbert would expostulate, "You mustn't sit here; Barrington won't like it."

The Times said of Barrington's performances, "His strength lay in his quietness of voice and movement... in perfect contrast to the restlessness of George Grossmith. No one could be so ridiculously pompous... he moved with effect. There was a native drollery in his lightly rolling dance, a comic dignity in his rotund and placid, yet twinklingly intelligent face. He always gave the impression of thoroughly enjoying whatever he did...." In its review of Ruddigore, The Theatre wrote, "Better comic acting than his, or more highly finished, I have never seen and never wish to see."

=== Theatrical management experiment and later Savoy roles ===
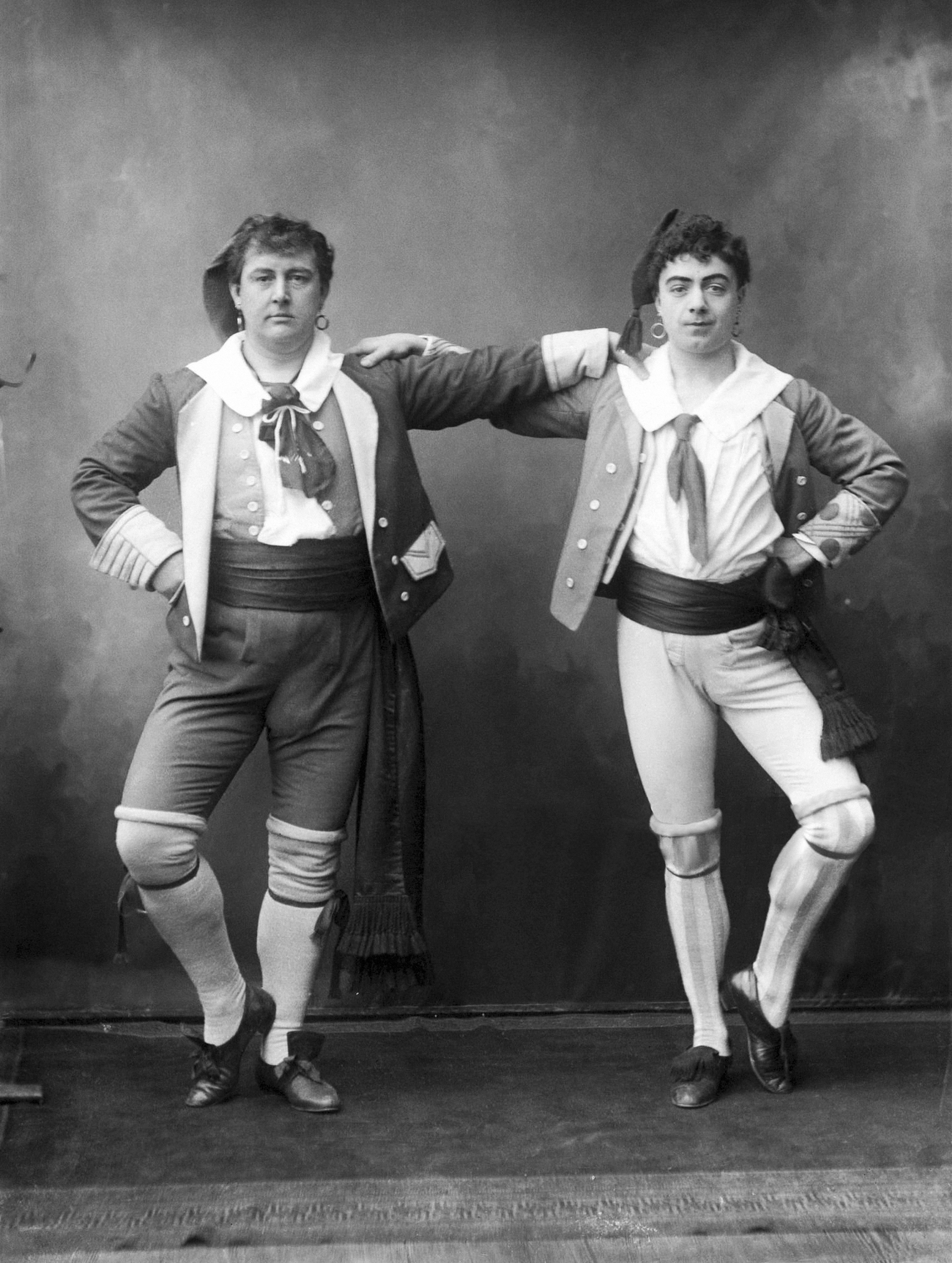
With Courtice Pounds, as Marco and Giuseppe, 1889

In 1888, Barrington left the D'Oyly Carte organisation and the Savoy Theatre, missing the chance to create the role of Wilfred in Yeomen, to try his hand at theatrical management, leasing the St. James's Theatre. The Illustrated Sporting and Dramatic News lamented Barrington's departure, suggesting that he was irreplaceable in the Savoy Operas: "He is the typical embodiment... of that British Philistinism, the pachydermatous hide of which Mr. Gilbert has so long striven to penetrate by the process of holding up its own image before it." In March 1888, Barrington played Chrysos in a benefit performance of Gilbert's Pygmalion and Galatea, a role that he would reprise at a number of "benefit" performances over the years. Later in the year, at the St. James's, Barrington produced The Dean's Daughter by Grundy and F. C. Phillips, also playing the Very Reverend Augustus St. Aubyn, Dean of Southwark. Though the piece was unsuccessful, Barrington's performance was praised, and it launched several theatrical careers, including Olga Nethersole's. Gilbert's Brantinghame Hall (an abject failure), starred Barrington as Mr. Thursby, as well as his younger brother, Duncan Fleet, Julia Neilson and Lewis Waller (the latter two in their professional stage debuts). Its companion piece was A Patron Saint. This experiment in management proved to be a financial disaster for Barrington, and he was bankrupt after only five months.

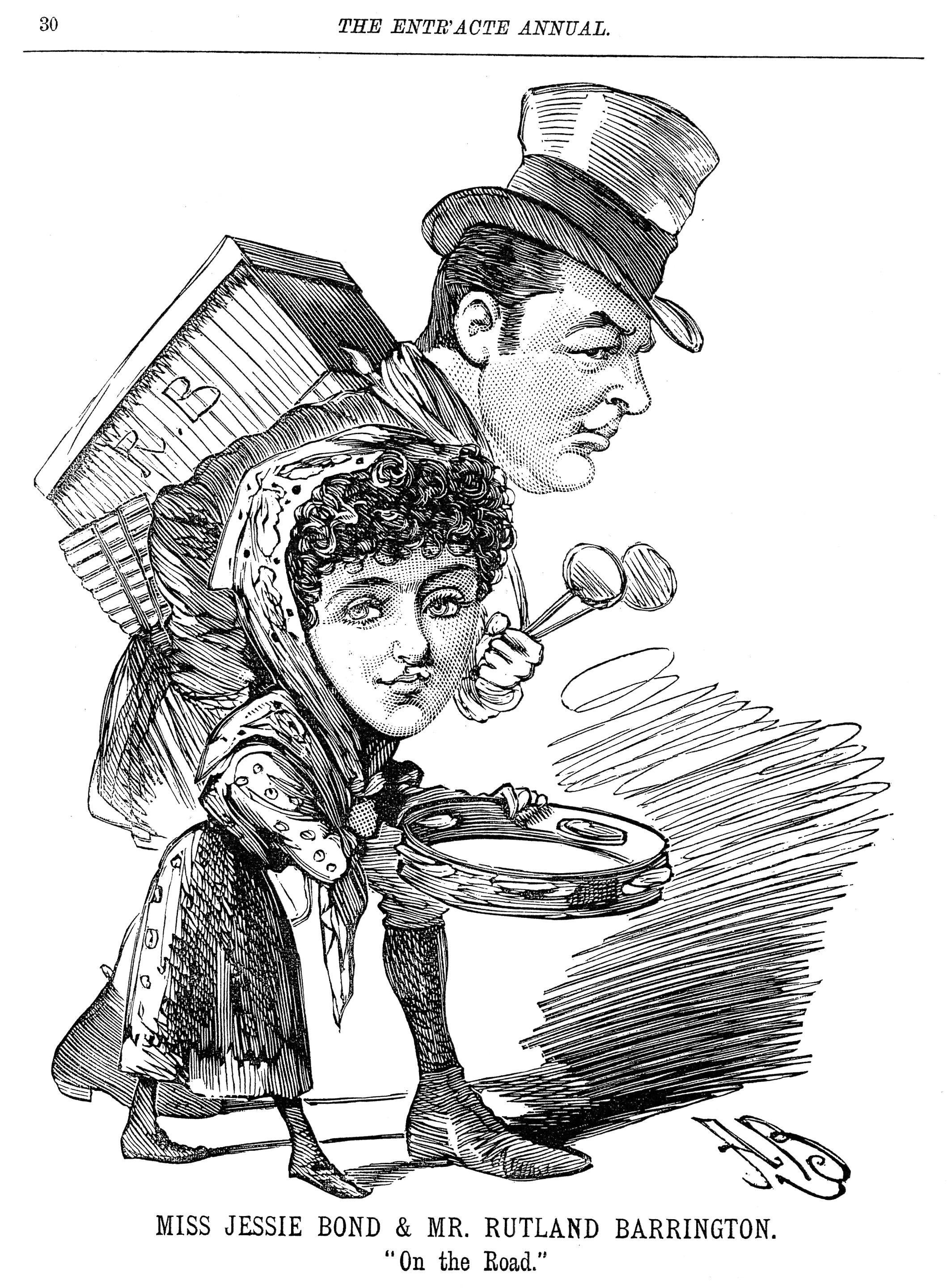
Jessie Bond and Barrington on their duologues tour in 1891

After Brantinghame Hall closed, he again played Chrysos in a revival of Pygmalion and Galatea at the Lyceum Theatre and played Mr Barnes in his own play, To the Death, at the Olympic Theatre. He then appeared at the Comedy Theatre under Charles Hawtrey in Pickwick (1889), a successful one-act musical play by F. C. Burnand and Edward Solomon based on an episode in The Pickwick Papers, which Barrington ended up directing and in which he alternated in the roles of Pickwick and Baker. Barrington then created the role of Lt. Col. Cadbury in a Grundy farce called Merry Margate and next played Tosser in a comic opera by Solomon and George P. Hawtrey called Penelope, in which he co-starred with Dan Leno. He also played a number of other roles in other theatres throughout 1889 until he rejoined D'Oyly Carte to create the role of Giuseppe in The Gondoliers in December 1889, remaining for the long run of that last Gilbert and Sullivan hit.

After The Gondoliers closed in 1891, Gilbert and Sullivan were estranged for a time. Barrington appeared in a few more roles at other theatres, including as Robert Plushly in his own piece, A Swarry Dansong, a duologue with music by Solomon. He then returned to the Savoy to star as Punka, the Rajah of Chutneypore, in Dance, Desprez, and Solomon's The Nautch Girl. In August 1891, Barrington and Jessie Bond took a leave of absence from that show to tour a series of "musical duologues" (written by Barrington and composed by Solomon) throughout Britain, returning to the Savoy in November. In 1892, Barrington played the title role of the Reverend William Barlow, in Grundy and Solomon's The Vicar of Bray and then toured with that show. In September 1892, he created the role of Rupert Vernon in Grundy and Sullivan's Haddon Hall, making a critical splash. For example, The Figaro wrote: "Barrington... kept the audience in shouts of laughter the whole time [he was] on the stage." In 1893, he created the role of the Proctor in J. M. Barrie, Arthur Conan Doyle, and Ernest Ford's Jane Annie, which was unsuccessful at the Savoy but ran more successfully on tour. Barrington, a lifelong golf enthusiast, speculated that one reason for the failure of Jane Annie in London was that the game of golf was not yet popular there. Despite the failure of the piece, Barrington was singled out for critical praise. Barrington next created the role of King Paramount I in Gilbert and Sullivan's Utopia, Limited, opening in October of that year. Barrington's comedy, Bartonmere Towers, was also produced at a matinee at the Savoy in 1893, with Barrington playing Sir James Hanbury.

With Ilka Pálmay in The Grand Duke, 1896

Barrington left the company again when Utopia closed, taking over the role of Dr Montague Brierly in the Hall, Greenbank and Jones musical, A Gaiety Girl (in 1894) produced at Daly's Theatre by George Edwardes and on tour. Next, he appeared in Gilbert and Carr's His Excellency (1894–95) creating the role of the Regent. The stage was dominated by a heroic-size statue of him in the role. Barrington also wrote and directed a one-act operetta, A Knight Errant, with music by Alfred Caldicott, which played as a companion piece with His Excellency at the Lyric Theatre. At Toole's Theatre, he played John Rimple in Thoroughbred, by Ralph R. Lumley, in early 1895. J. L. Toole had originated the role but took ill and was forced to retire. Barrington also played in some German Reed Entertainments, including a revival of Happy Arcadia at St. George's Hall in 1895, starring Fanny Holland, and toured with the German Reeds.

In November 1895, Barrington returned to the Savoy as Pooh-Bah in another revival of The Mikado. In March 1896 he created the role of Ludwig in Gilbert and Sullivan's last opera, The Grand Duke. In his 1908 memoir, Barrington wrote of some difficulty in getting along with his co-star, Ilka Pálmay, who was cast in the role of Julia. As usual, the critics were pleased with Barrington, "on whom... falls the chief burden of the piece, is intensely funny as Ludwig, more especially in the absurd costume of the second act...." After another revival of The Mikado, Barrington again left the Savoy.

=== Musical comedy and music hall ===
Beginning in 1896, Barrington spent ten very successful years under the management of Edwardes at Daly's, first taking over the role of the Marquis Imari in The Geisha (1896), and then creating roles in a number of other Edwardian musical comedy hits, including Marcus Pomponius in A Greek Slave (1898), Yen How in San Toy (1899), The Rajah of Bhong in A Country Girl (1902), and Boobhamba in The Cingalee (1904), among others.

Playing Marcus in A Greek Slave, 1898

In these roles, he had more freedom to add "gags" than Gilbert had given him at the Savoy, and he often wrote topical verses to Adrian Ross's songs. However, Barrington complained that, in these musical comedies, the plot was nearly eliminated during rehearsals. During this time, Barrington often reprised his role as the Judge at benefit matinees. Also during this period, several of Barrington's stage works were produced by Arthur Bourchier at the Garrick Theatre, including Barrington's popular children's "fairy play" called Water Babies, based on Charles Kingsley's 1863 book, with music by Frederick Rosse, Albert Fox and Alfred Cellier (1902). Barrington directed Water Babies. Another Barrington play, Little Black Sambo and Little White Barbara, with music by Wilfred Bendall, enjoyed 31 matinees at the Garrick in 1904.

Barrington appeared between 1905 and 1907 in several musical comedies, including The White Chrysanthemum (1905), as Admiral Sir Horatio Armitage, K.C.B. (with Isabel Jay, Louie Pounds and Henry Lytton). He also played Barnabas Goodeve in a revival of the farce The Candidate by Justin Huntly McCarthy at Wyndham's Theatre with Charles Wyndham. He then briefly played his old role in a revival of The Geisha in 1906, after which he created the role of the Pharaoh of Egypt in the successful comic opera Amasis (1906), by Philip Michael Faraday and Frederick Fenn, both in London (where it ran for over 200 performances) and on extended tours.

The Moody Mariner
Barrington sings "The Moody Mariner" in his only recording (1905)

During this period, Barrington performed his own solo music hall sketches at the Coliseum and produced various tours, performing standard topical songs of the day, including the only song that he recorded, "The Moody Mariner" (1905). This was based on a story in Many Cargoes by Jacobs, with lyrics by Barrington and music by Walter Slaughter. Other such sketches and songs included "Man the Lifeboat" (1907), written by Leedham Bantock (starring also William Terriss) "Across the Silent Way" and "The Tramp" by Barrington and Slaughter, and Mummydom (1907), which he had written in 1903 with Wilfrid Bendall (Sullivan's former secretary) based on his play of the same name that had been produced some years earlier at Penley's Theatre. He also wrote a Rip van Winkle sketch for Courtice Pounds and a one-act musical drama, No. 442, His Escape (1907), with music by H. M. Higgs. Barrington became known for writing topical verses on short notice. In his 1908 memoir, he tells the following story:

The final tie of the Association Football Cup was being played at the Crystal Palace, and I determined to sing them a verse giving the score at half-time.... I had written... an alternative two lines to suit whichever team had scored, but when the curtain rose for my turn the news had not come. While I was singing the song I saw the stage manager in the wings waving a telegram. ...I went to the wings, got the envelope, opened it before the audience, and sang them the information that Aston Villa was a goal ahead. I do not think I have ever had a greater success with a verse.

Helen D'Oyly Carte with Barrington, c. 1908

Barrington returned to the D'Oyly Carte Opera Company in 1908 for the second of the London repertory seasons, playing Pooh-Bah, Captain Corcoran, Mountararat, and the Sergeant of Police once again, and adding the roles of Wilfred Shadbolt in Yeomen (finally completing the feat of playing a principal role in all thirteen extant Gilbert and Sullivan operas), and Don Alhambra in The Gondoliers to his Savoy repertoire. He then played in more music hall sketches and toured in musicals, including in A Member of Tattersall's, an adaptation by Adrian Ross of Leo Fall's Die Geschtedene Frau (1909, repeated in London in 1911); as the Marquis of Steyne in The Walls of Jericho (1909); and as Judge Tucker in The Bigamist (1910). In 1910, he created the role of Lucas van Tromp in The Girl in the Train at the Vaudeville Theatre.

=== Last years ===
Barrington also established himself on the legitimate stage, playing Falstaff in The Merry Wives of Windsor at His Majesty's Theatre in 1911; he appeared in Baron Trenck and in several other roles from 1911 to 1913; on tour in Other People's Babies, by Lechmere Worrall, in 1913; as Lord Leonard Alcar in the highly successful The Great Adventure by Arnold Bennett (1913–14; based on Bennett's 1908 novel, Buried Alive); as Max Somossy in The Joy-Ride Lady, by Arthur Anderson and Hartley Carrick at the New Theatre (1914); and Polonius in Hamlet and Christopher Sly in The Taming of the Shrew at His Majesty's in 1916, among other roles. He continued to perform in London and in the provinces until 1918, from 1916 under the management of John Martin-Harvey. One of his later successes was a reprise of his 1909 role as the kindly bookmaker Peter Perks in A Member of Tattersall's. His last role was Claus in The Burgomaster of Stilemonde, by Count Maurice Maeterlinck, at the Lyceum Theatre, Edinburgh, beginning in October 1918.

Barrington wrote horse racing columns for Punch magazine under the pseudonym Lady Gay and also wrote two volumes of reminiscences, in 1908 and 1911. He also appeared in four silent films: San Toy (1900); as Mr. Texel in The Great Adventure (1915); as Septimus Beaumont in The Girl Who Loves a Soldier (1916); and as Mr. Potter in Still Waters Run Deep (1916). In addition to his avid interest in several sports, which he describes at length in his memoirs, Barrington was a skilled artist in watercolours and pen and ink.

After Barrington suffered a paralytic stroke in early 1919, he was unable to perform. He spent the rest of his life in poverty, although his fellow actors held benefits and made other efforts to help him, and his brothers and his neighbours in East Hagbourne, Berkshire, helped him as he became increasingly disabled and eventually unable even to speak. He died in 1922 while living at the St. James's Infirmary, Balham, in South London, at the age of 69 and is buried in Lower Morden Lane at the Morden Cemetery, also known as Battersea New Cemetery, in Surrey. On the 75th anniversary of Barrington's death, a granite monument with a photoplaque of Barrington as Pooh-Bah was dedicated to him at the Morden Cemetery, by members of the Gilbert and Sullivan Society, the Sir Arthur Sullivan Society and others.
