= In the Sulks =

Comic opera by Alfred Cellier and Frank Desprez

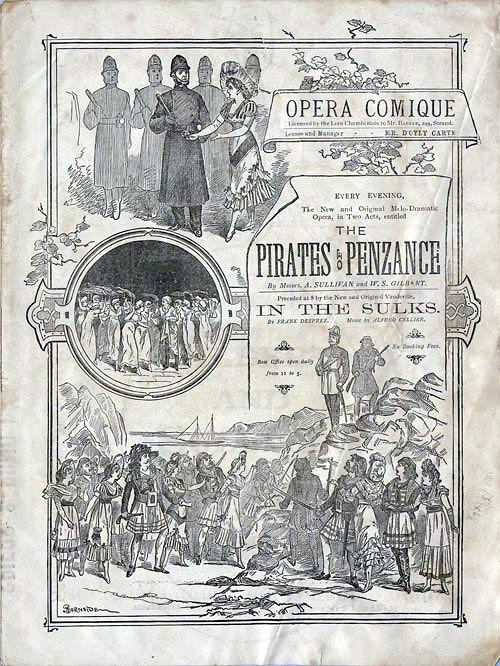
1881 programme cover

In the Sulks is a one-act comic opera with a libretto by Frank Desprez and music by Alfred Cellier. It was first performed at the Opera Comique on 21 February 1880; revived 3 April 1880 to 2 April 1881 as a curtain raiser to The Pirates of Penzance, and again from 25 April to 2 May 1881 and from 11 to 14 October 1881 as a curtain raiser to Patience. It was also performed from 21 February to 20 March 1880 at matinees with the Children's Pinafore. The piece also toured frequently from 1879 to 1882.

There is no printed libretto or vocal score. A copy of the libretto is in the Lord Chamberlain's collection.

The fashion in the late Victorian era was to present long evenings in the theatre, and the producer Richard D'Oyly Carte preceded his Savoy operas with curtain raisers such as In the Sulks. W. J. MacQueen-Pope commented, concerning such curtain raisers:

This was a one-act play, seen only by the early comers. It would play to empty boxes, half-empty upper circle, to a gradually filling stalls and dress circle, but to an attentive, grateful and appreciative pit and gallery. Often these plays were little gems. They deserved much better treatment than they got, but those who saw them delighted in them. ... [They] served to give young actors and actresses a chance to win their spurs ... the stalls and the boxes lost much by missing the curtain-raiser, but to them dinner was more important.

== Synopsis ==
After an argument, Mr. Liverby is sulking and refusing to speak to his wife. Mrs. Liverby decides to make him jealous and writes a love letter to herself, allegedly from a young man. Mr. Liverby finds a love letter, but when he learns it was a joke he forgives her. However, the letter turns out not to be the one Mrs. Liverby had written, but another one written by a young man who has been hanging around the house for days trying to get an opportunity to speak to her. She is terrified, but her husband refuses to listen, thinking that this is another joke to try to make him lose his temper again, and he is determined to stay in a good humour. The young man eventually turns out to be Mr. Liverby's nephew who had been let go by Liverby's firm, and who has merely been trying to persuade Mrs. Liverby to put in a good word for him. Mr. Liverby agrees to reinstate his nephew, and all ends happily.

== Musical numbers ==
- No. 1 - Song - Georgina
- No. 2 - Duet - Liverby and Georgina
- No. 3 - Trio - Georgina, Liverby and Joseph
- No. 4 - Finale

== Cast information ==
The original cast was:

- Mr. James Liverby, a man of business – George Temple
- Mrs. Georgina Liverby, his wife – Lilian La Rue
- Joseph, a boy in buttons – Frank Thornton
- one muta persona – Ellen Shirley

When the Pirates company returned from New York in 1881, Julia Gwynne replaced La Rue as Mrs. Liverby. When George Temple left at the end of the run of Pirates, W. H. Seymour took over the role of Mr. Liverby.
