= Richard Temple (bass-baritone) =

English opera singer, actor and stage director

Richard Temple as Strephon in Iolanthe (1882)

Richard Barker Cobb Temple (2 March 1846 – 19 October 1912) was an English opera singer, actor and stage director, best known for his performances in the bass-baritone roles in the famous series of Gilbert and Sullivan comic operas.

After an opera career in London and throughout Britain beginning in 1869, Temple joined the D'Oyly Carte Opera Company in 1877. There, he created most of the bass-baritone roles in the Savoy Operas, as follows: Sir Marmaduke in The Sorcerer (1877), Dick Deadeye in H.M.S. Pinafore (1878), the Pirate King in the London production of The Pirates of Penzance (1880), Colonel Calverley in Patience (1881), Arac in Princess Ida (1884), the title character in The Mikado, Sir Roderic in Ruddigore and Sergeant Meryll in The Yeomen of the Guard (1888). He also played the baritone roles of Strephon in the original production of Iolanthe (1882), and Giuseppe in the New York production of The Gondoliers (1890).

During the next two decades, Temple played in, or directed, a variety of comic operas, musical comedies and plays, and sang in concerts, both in London and on tour. He also taught acting and directed productions at music schools, primarily at the Royal Academy of Music and the Royal College of Music.

== Early life and opera career ==
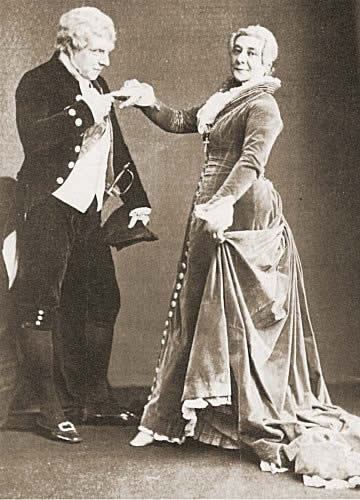
Temple with Mrs Howard Paul in The Sorcerer

Temple was born in London, the eldest son of Richard Cobb, a stockbroker from Yorkshire, and his wife, Eliza Barker. He worked as a bank clerk and cashier and began to sing and act as and amateur. In 1867 he participated in a charity concert for St Patrick’s Benevolent Fund alongside Rose Hersee, and the following year he performed in The Foster Sister at the Haymarket Theatre, produced by Thomas Coe, a noted acting teacher.

Temple made his professional stage debut at the Crystal Palace in May 1869 as Count Rodolfo in La sonnambula. He soon sang in Lucia di Lammermoor, played Pablo in The Rose of Castille and was the King in Maritana. He subsequently toured the provinces with opera and opera bouffe companies, playing the title role in Verdi's Rigoletto, among others. The next year at St George's Hall, London, he played Mephistopheles in Faust and the King in Maritana, and later sang in oratorio there. The same year, at the Crystal Palace, among other roles, he repeated the King, played Father Tom in The Lily of Killarney, and the Sheriff in Martha. He continued to sing other roles in the provinces. Despite this early success, of his performance in The Rose of Castille in 1871, The Observer commented, "Possibly, the less said about Mr Richard Temple ... the better." Also in 1871, among other concert and opera roles, Temple toured with Fred Sullivan's Operetta Company, appearing as Sergeant Bouncer in Arthur Sullivan's Cox and Box, as Marquis in Punchinello by William Charles Levey, and Old Matthew in H. B. Farnie's Offenbach adaptation Breaking the Spell, among other roles, at Manchester and Liverpool. Arthur Sullivan was the musical director.

By this time, he was courting his frequent duet partner, Elizabeth Ellen "Bessie" Emmett (1846–1875), and the two married In 1872. Later the same year, he joined Rose Hersee's Royal National Opera at St James's Theatre. The following year he gave concerts in London and toured in opera before returning to London to play the role of Pippertrunk in Le Roi Carotte at the Alhambra Theatre, and Gérome, in L'œil crevé at the Opera Comique. In 1873, between tours in Dublin and elsewhere and roles in his Crystal Palace Operetta Company, Temple appeared as Larivaudière in the very successful English-language premiere of La fille de Madame Angot, adapted by Farnie, at the Gaiety Theatre in London, and in the same role later at the Philharmonic Hall and Opera Comique. The following year, he played Pluto opposite Fred Sullivan's Mercury in the Victorian burlesque Ixion Re-wheeled at the Opera Comique and later took roles at the Alexandra Palace. Three days after she gave birth in May 1875, his wife and infant son died.

Temple as Dick Deadeye in H.M.S. Pinafore

In 1875 he again appeared in Breaking the Spell. Later that year, Temple produced, directed, and appeared as Thomas Brown in, a revival of Arthur Sullivan's one-act comic opera The Zoo, at the Philharmonic Theatre, which was played as an afterpiece to an adaptation of Offenbach's Les Géorgiennes, with Temple as Rhododendron Pasha. Among other roles in 1876, he created the role of Buckingham in Alfred Cellier's Nell Gwynne and played the title-role in Cellier's The Sultan of Mocha. At the Globe Theatre he appeared in Edward Solomon's first opera, A Will With Vengeance. The following year, he played the title role in The Marriage of Figaro with great success at the Crystal Palace in the Rose Hersee Opera Company production, with Florence St. John as Cherubino He also produced his own English version of Offenbach's Geneviève de Brabant as well as playing in various roles in London.

== D'Oyly Carte years ==
In 1877 Temple was engaged to create the part of Sir Marmaduke Pointdextre in the first production of Gilbert and Sullivan's The Sorcerer at the Opera Comique, produced by Richard D'Oyly Carte. The following year, he created the role of Dick Deadeye in the company's long-running international hit, H.M.S. Pinafore. During the original runs of The Sorcerer and Pinafore, Temple also took parts in the short companion pieces that accompanied these longer works. He played Fred Fancourt in the 1877–78 revival of Dora's Dream, the title role in The Spectre Knight (1878), General Deelah in Cups and Saucers (1878–79), and Selworthy in After All! (1878–79). He also produced an opera season in Dublin in 1879.

Temple played the Pirate King in the first London production of The Pirates of Penzance (1880–81). He next created the part of Colonel Calverley in Patience (Opera Comique, 1881), but left the company on 8 October of that year, the day before the piece left the Opera Comique to transfer to the new Savoy Theatre. Temple remained at the Opera Comique where, from October–December 1881, he appeared as King Portico in a revival of W. S. Gilbert and Frederic Clay's comic opera Princess Toto produced by John Hollingshead. He also gave "Richard Temple's Dramatic Recital" at Peckham in 1881, played in other operetta at the Opera Comique and, in Manchester, created the role of King James in The Lancashire Witches and played Abdallah in Solomon’s Lord Bateman.

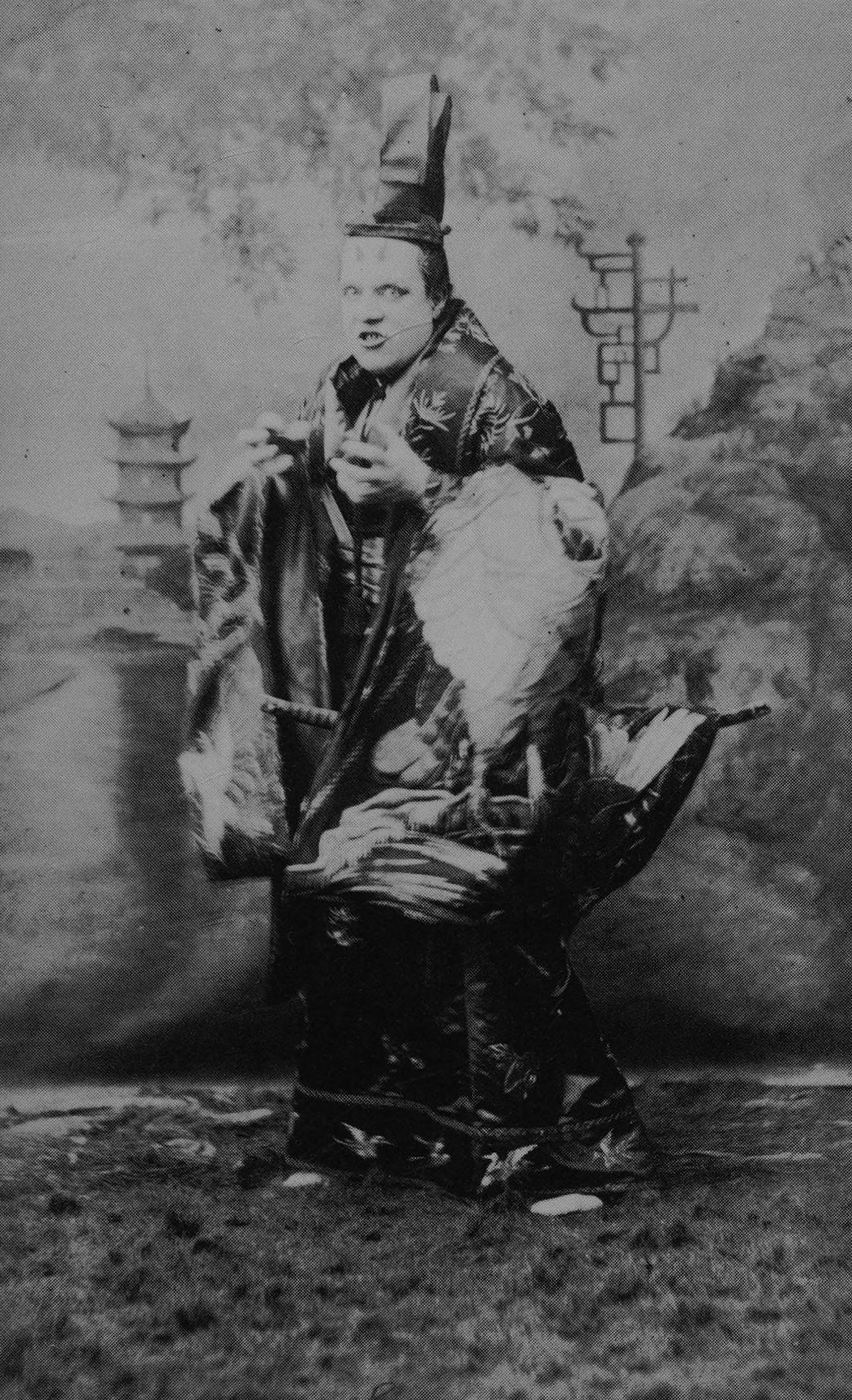
Temple as The Mikado of Japan

Temple soon returned to the D'Oyly Carte Opera Company, creating the role of Strephon in Iolanthe (1882–84), the only Savoy Opera in which he was cast as the romantic hero. During the run of Iolanthe, Temple was also co-director of the Crystal Palace opera season with Faulkner Leigh and August Manns, presenting Maritana, Faust and Il Barbiere di Siviglia. Next, Temple created the role of Arac in Gilbert and Sullivan's Princess Ida (1884) and revisited the role of Sir Marmaduke in the first revival of The Sorcerer (1884–85). He then created his most celebrated role, the Mikado of Japan in The Mikado (1885–87), whom, according to Jessie Bond, he played as "suave and oily". In 1887 he created the part of Sir Roderic Murgatroyd in Ruddigore (1887). After revivals of Pinafore, Pirates and Mikado, in which he repeated his original roles, Temple played Sergeant Meryll in The Yeomen of the Guard (1888–89), the final role he would create for Gilbert and Sullivan. During these years, between these Savoy pieces, he played several other opera roles in London, including the title role in Rigoletto.

== Journeyman actor and director ==
Temple declined the role of Luiz in the next Gilbert and Sullivan opera, The Gondoliers, when it opened at the Savoy in December 1889, but in February 1890 he was one of the replacements rushed to New York for the restaging of The Gondoliers at Palmer's Theatre, taking the role of Giuseppe. Before that he appeared in Trial by Jury and again in Cox and Box and made his debut in music hall. He later appeared in The Gondoliers on tour in the English provinces. In July 1890, he left the company again to pursue a directing career. In 1891, he married Annie Marie Davis Watts, with whom he had been living since at least 1881.

Temple was back with a D'Oyly Carte touring company briefly the following year, playing Pyjama in The Nautch Girl. Also in 1892, he was appointed to the Royal College of Music, where he directed student productions. He made occasional appearances in London in L' Impresario at the Olympic Theatre (1892), as Lord Silvertop in The Golden Web at the Lyric Theatre in 1893, as George in Miami at Princess's Theatre in 1893, as Sid Fakah in Morocco Bound, with music by Osmond Carr, at the Shaftesbury Theatre and then the Trafalgar Theatre in 1893–94, and starred as Dick in Wapping Old Stairs at the Vaudeville Theatre in 1894, which he also directed and produced.

Temple returned to the Savoy and D'Oyly Carte in October 1894, replacing John Coates as Baron Van den Berg in Mirette. In December 1894 at the Savoy, he created the part of Sancho in Sullivan and Burnand's The Chieftain, and later that month played Sergeant Bouncer when a revival of Cox and Box was added to the bill. After a year's absence from the company, he returned to the Savoy briefly in 1896 to give some performances in the title role of a revival of The Mikado, and he also directed the premiere of Charles Villiers Stanford's Shamus O'Brien at the Opera Comique that year, among other directing. He then appeared in the first revival of Yeomen in 1897. In December 1898 he filled in as Sir Marmaduke in The Sorcerer, and in 1899 he played Dick Deadeye again in the third revival of H.M.S. Pinafore at the Savoy.

Temple as Sancho in The Chieftain

In addition to his theatre work, Temple sang in concerts, especially in the later part of his career. Of his recital at the Steinway Hall in 1903, The Times said, "It is unnecessary to say more than that the eminent artist showed how fully he understands the traditions of various schools, such as the German opera of the past ... French opéra-comique ... and the Italian buffo style." At a later Steinway Hall recital he performed the then avant-garde Enoch Arden to Richard Strauss's music. Temple gave recitals in other venues, including the Queen's Hall. He also set himself up as a "musical and dramatic" reciter.

== Later years ==
Temple continued to appear in various comic operas and musical comedies, including A Prince of Borneo (1899), billed as "an operatic farce"; The Gay Pretenders (1900), with George Grossmith senior and junior, and Frank Wyatt; and the captain in San Toy on tour in 1901. He also played Northumberland in Herbert Beerbohm Tree's production of William Shakespeare's Richard II at Her Majesty's Theatre in 1903, and that Christmas, he was in Little Hans Andersen as King of the Copper Castle, produced by William Greet with members of the Savoy company.

In October 1904, Temple appeared briefly on tour in two of his original roles – as Dick Deadeye in Pinafore and Strephon in Iolanthe. He directed Liza Lehmann's The Vicar of Wakefield in 1906–07, starring Isabel Jay, and also played the role of Burchell. In October 1908, he returned to the Savoy to give a few performances as Deadeye in Pinafore in place of Henry Lytton. In March 1909, he played Sergeant Meryll in Yeomen.

Beginning in the mid-1890s, Temple devoted much of his time to teaching acting and directing productions at music schools, primarily at The Royal College of Music where he was Professor of Elocution and Acting until the year of his death. He directed many student productions with Charles Villiers Stanford conducting, including Gluck's Orfeo, with the young Clara Butt (1893); the UK premiere of Léo Delibes' Le roi l'a dit (1895); Purcell's Dido and Aeneas (1895); Verdi's Falstaff (1896); Wagner's The Flying Dutchman (1898); Weber's Euryanthe (1900); Fidelio (1902); and Schumann's Genoveva, with the young George Baker (1910).

For the Royal Academy of Music, he directed Verdi's Un ballo in maschera in 1908. At the Academy, as Director of the Dramatic Class, his many students included Eva Turner and Darrell Fancourt, who later became well known as Temple's successor in the Gilbert and Sullivan bass-baritone roles. At the Royal Academy and the Royal College he taught many other students, including future Gilbert and Sullivan performers George Baker and Clara Dow, and Muriel Foster, who became known as an oratorio singer.

After an illness of some 18 months, a benefit was held for Temple in September 1912. Temple died at Charing Cross Hospital in London the following month at the age of 66. Temple is portrayed by Timothy Spall in the 1999 Mike Leigh film, Topsy-Turvy. His son Richard William Cobb Temple (1872–1954) became an actor in Britain and America. He was married to musical theatre star Evie Greene.

A More Humane Mikado
Temple sings "A More Humane Mikado" from The Mikado, 1902

== Recordings ==
Temple made some records in 1902–03 for the Gramophone & Typewriter Company. His renditions of "A More Humane Mikado" and "O Better Far to Live and Die" appear on the Pearl CD, The Art of the Savoyard (GEMM CD 9991).
