= Opera Comique =

19th-century theatre in London

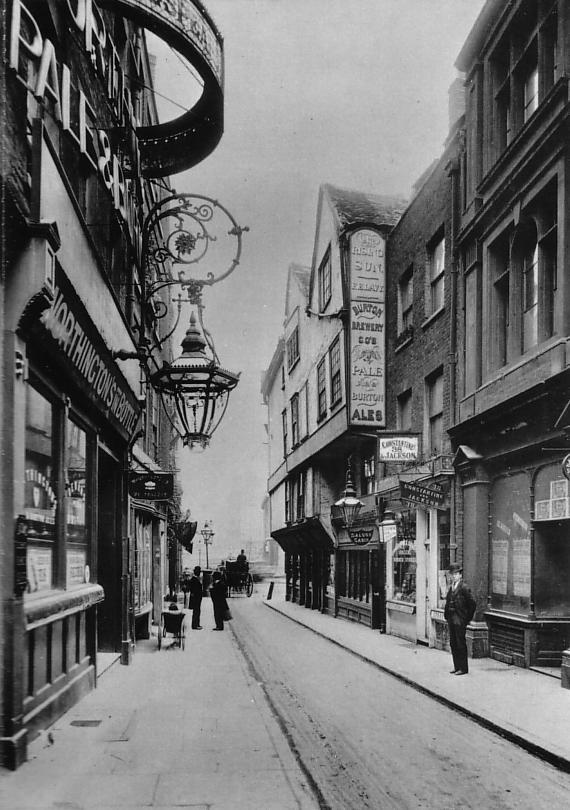
- A 1901 postcard of Wych Street, shortly before its demolition
- Interactive map of Opera Comique
- Address: 299 Strand; Westminster, London
- Coordinates: 51°30′47″N 00°06′57″W
- Designation: Demolished
- Current use: Site occupied by Bush House

Construction
- Opened: 1870
- Closed: 1899
- Architect: F. H. Fowler

The Opera Comique was a 19th-century theatre constructed in Westminster, London, located between Wych Street, Holywell Street and the Strand. It opened in 1870 and was demolished in 1902, to make way for the construction of the Aldwych and Kingsway.

The theatre was built cheaply as a speculative venture, and was known as one of the "rickety twins" along with the adjacent Globe Theatre. Numerous managements presented plays in English, French and German, and the house was also used for extravaganzas and English versions of French opéras bouffes. It is best remembered as the theatre where several early Gilbert and Sullivan operas had their first runs, between 1877 and 1881.

== History ==
=== Background and early years ===
In the 16th century Lyon's Inn, one of the Inns of Chancery attached to London's Inner Temple, stood on the site. By the 1860s the area had deteriorated greatly, and the old inn had been converted into what the historians Mander and Mitchenson describe as "dwellings of a dubious nature". In 1864 part of the area was cleared, and the impresario Sefton Parry built a new theatre, the Globe, which opened in 1868. He acquired an adjacent site, bounded by Wych Street, Holywell Street and the Strand, on which he built the Opera Comique two years later. The architect was Francis Fowler.

Parry's construction of the theatres was a speculative venture: he hoped to make large profits from compensation when the area was demolished, which was even then in contemplation. It remained in contemplation for more than thirty years. The two theatres, which backed on to each other, became known as "the rickety twins": both were of such flimsy construction that performers could hear each other through the common wall. Despite the nickname, the Opera Comique was by no means a twin of the Globe, being only about half the size, with a seating capacity of 862, compared with more than 1,500 at the Globe.

Another way in which the two theatres differed was that, unlike the Globe, the Opera Comique was largely underground. It was entered through tunnels from three streets (including the Strand) and was nicknamed the "Theatre Royal Tunnels". It was reportedly draughty, and its long flight of stairs leading down to the level of the stalls was a dangerous fire hazard. Despite this and the flimsy construction, the theatre attracted high praise from the press after it opened. The Era, commented, "For elegance of design and perfect adaptability to the requirements of dramatic art it is not surpassed, if indeed it be equalled, by any existing Theatre". Another London journal reported:

We are almost inclined to pronounce it the prettiest theatre in London. It is in the flat horse-shoe form, the stage being well within sight and hearing of every part of the auditorium. This comprises rows of comfortable and elegant stalls on the floor, with three tiers or circles extending nearly round the house as dress-circle, family-circle, and amphitheatre, respectively, and six private boxes on either side of the stage. The design of construction reflects the highest credit on Mr F. H. Fowler, the architect, and the chaste and elegant decorations of Mr K. W. Bradwell deserve great praise.

The theatre opened under the name "Royal Opera Comique" on 29 October 1870. A company from the Théâtre Déjazet in Paris, led by the veteran actress Virginie Déjazet, presented Victorien Sardou's comedy Les Prés Saint-Gervais and two shorter pieces, to an audience that included the Prince of Wales. The following year, French drama continued, when the Comédie-Française company made its first appearance outside France, an event that caused considerable interest.

The first home-grown production at the theatre was a musical play in 1871, Marie, with music by Richard D'Oyly Carte and a libretto by E. Spencer Mott. This accompanied an English adaptation of Molière's Le Médecin malgré lui. The production was not a success. Opéras bouffes by Hervé, Offenbach and Lecocq, and extravaganzas by F. C. Burnand followed. After short seasons starring the Italian tragedienne Adelaide Ristori and then the English operetta star Emily Soldene, Carte became manager of the theatre in 1874, and presented The Broken Branch, an English version of Gaston Serpette's operetta La branch cassée, starring Pauline Rita. Carte's first attempt to found "a permanent abode for Light Opera" failed, and the theatre passed into other hands for the next three years.

The word "Royal" was dropped from the name of the theatre in 1876. Burnand and Charles Morton were both briefly managers there, presenting extravaganzas and comic operas respectively. Morton's season in 1876 included well-received productions of Offenbach's Madame l'archiduc and Lecocq's La fille de Madame Angot, featuring Soldene and Kate Santley and, in the second piece, W. S. Penley, promoted from the chorus. Morton also presented a successful double bill of Gilbert and Sullivan's Trial by Jury and Offenbach's Geneviève de Brabant. After Morton a succession of managements between May 1876 and September 1877 staged productions that made little impact.

=== Gilbert and Sullivan ===
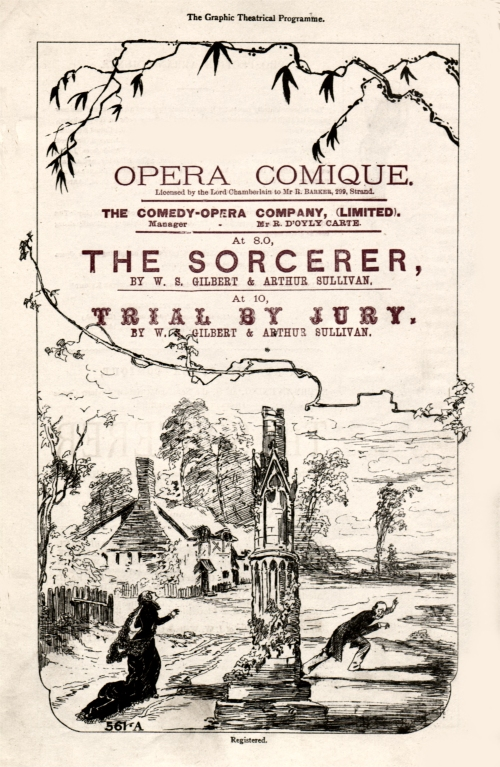
1878 programme cover

In November 1877 the Comedy Opera Company, managed by Carte, took on the lease and staged the premiere of Gilbert and Sullivan's The Sorcerer. This was followed in 1878 by the same team's H.M.S. Pinafore, which became a hit, running for 571 performances, the second-longest theatrical run in history, to that date. During the performance on 31 July 1879, Carte's former business partners in the Comedy Opera Company (with whom Carte, Gilbert and Sullivan had split) tried to seize the set, creating a celebrated fracas. Over Christmas 1878, during the run of H.M.S. Pinafore, the theatre was renovated and redecorated by E. W. Bradwell, reopening on 1 February 1879. The Era commented, "We can hardly overpraise the beauty and grace of the Opera Comique as it now appears to the delighted audience."

Two more Gilbert and Sullivan successes followed, now produced by the D'Oyly Carte Opera Company: The Pirates of Penzance (1880) and, finally, Patience (1881), which was later transferred to Carte's new and larger theatre, the Savoy. During this period, Carte also presented various companion pieces with the Gilbert and Sullivan operas, including the 1877 revival of Dora's Dream by Arthur Cecil and Alfred Cellier; The Spectre Knight (1878); revivals of Trial by Jury; several pieces by George Grossmith beginning in 1878: Beauties on the Beach, A Silver Wedding, Five Hamlets, and Cups and Saucers; revivals of Gilbert's After All!; a Children's Pinafore with an entirely juvenile cast (1878); In the Sulks (1880); and Uncle Samuel (1881).

=== Later years ===
Once D'Oyly Carte left the Opera Comique the theatre's fortunes declined. It was unoccupied from October to the end of 1881. At the start of 1882, John Hollingshead and Richard Barker presented Mother-in-Law, a frivolous comedy by George R. Sims, which ran in a double bill with a burlesque called Vulcan, until May. They were followed by a spoof called The Wreck of the Pinafore by H. Lingard and Luscombe Searelle, described by The Era as "curious and impudent", which ran until October. During the rest of the 1880s a succession of managements presented a wide range of genres, from adaptations of French plays, Shakespeare, Sheridan, Ibsen, and a Dickens adaptation by the novelist's son, to musical shows, including The Fay o' Fire by Edward Jones and Henry Herman, which The Era later described as "notable as introducing Miss Marie Tempest to the regular stage". Composers whose works were presented at the Opera Comique in this period included Julia Woolf, Meyer Lutz and Victor Roger. Performers included Nelly Bromley, Frank Wyatt, Johnston Forbes-Robertson, Julia Gwynne and Penley.

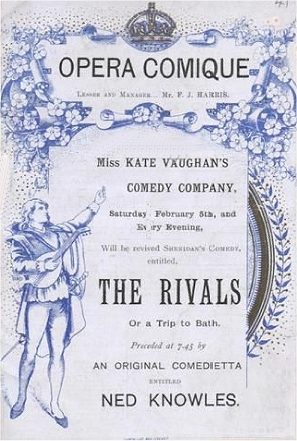
1887 programme cover

The theatre was again renovated in 1885, under the proprietorship of the actor-manager, David James. The Era thought that the refurbishments made it "one of the most convenient, handsome, and acceptable places of entertainment in London". James had bought adjoining premises in Holywell Street to make room for an extension to the theatre. The bars and circulation areas were, according to The Era, much improved, a spacious smoking room was added, and new emergency exits were installed. In 1891, George Edwardes took on the management of the theatre and presented a burlesque of Joan of Arc by Adrian Ross, J. L. Shine and Frank Osmond Carr, with a cast including Arthur Roberts and Marion Hood. It was well received and ran from January to September. After that, the theatre reverted to its pattern of rapidly changing productions and short-lived managements.

A feature of the early 1890s was the frequent presentation of adaptations from, or original works by, novelists such as Henry James, Rudyard Kipling and George Moore. A further season of French plays, performed in their original language, was followed by a German season, also given in the original, in 1894, which ran for more than two months. In early 1895, "Nellie Farren started her unfortunate season here with a bad comedy … and a worse burlesque", according to The Era. Later that year Augustus Harris presented Charles Villiers Stanford's comic opera Shamus O'Brien, which ran for two months, from March to May. Osmond Carr's The Maid of Athens, ran for a month in June 1897, after which, said The Era, "nothing worthy of any record whatever has been attempted at this temple of the drama, which has had a singularly eccentric and mostly disastrous career." A revival of a musical adaptation of Alice in Wonderland, with music by Walter Slaughter, opened for the Christmas season of 1898 and ran until mid-February 1899. In March 1899, Horace Sedger announced a burlesque for the Opera Comique, Great Caesar, by Paul and Walter Rubens and George Grossmith Jr., but he changed his plans and presented it at the Comedy Theatre.

The Opera Comique closed in 1899 and was compulsorily purchased by the London County Council for £40,000. It was demolished in 1902 when the area was redeveloped to create Aldwych (named after old Wych Street) and Kingsway.

== References and sources ==
=== Sources ===
- Ainger, Michael (2002). Gilbert and Sullivan – A Dual Biography. Oxford: Oxford University Press. ISBN 978-0-19-514769-8.
- Gaye, Freda, ed. (1967). Who's Who in the Theatre (fourteenth ed.). London: Sir Isaac Pitman and Sons. OCLC 5997224.
- Goodman, Andrew (1988). Gilbert and Sullivan's London. London: Spellmount. ISBN 978-0-946771-31-8.
- Mander, Raymond; Joe Mitchenson (1976) [1968]. Lost Theatres of London (second ed.). London: New English Library. ISBN 978-0-450-02838-0.
- Parker, John, ed. (1925). Who's Who in the Theatre (fifth ed.). London: Sir Isaac Pitman and Sons. OCLC 10013159.
- Rollins, Cyril; R. John Witts (1962). The D'Oyly Carte Opera Company in Gilbert and Sullivan Operas: A Record of Productions, 1875–1961. London: Michael Joseph. OCLC 504581419.
- Wood, Henry J (1938). My Life of Music. London: Victor Gollancz. OCLC 30533927.
