= Frank Desprez =

English playwright, essayist, and poet

Frank Desprez in 1913

Frank Desprez (9 February 1853 – 25 November 1916) was an English playwright, essayist, and poet. He wrote more than twenty pieces for the theatre, as well as numerous shorter works, including his famous poem, Lasca.

== Life and career ==
Desprez was born in Bristol, England, the eldest of the eleven children of Charles Desprez, a jeweller and silversmith. The family was of French descent. He was educated at Cosham School, Wiltshire and spent three years in his teens in the U.S. State of Texas. In 1883, Desprez married Jessie Louisa Potter Macqueen. They had a son and two daughters.

=== Librettist and assistant to Richard D'Oyly Carte ===
Desprez returned to Britain in 1875. His first piece written for the theatre shortly thereafter was an adaptation of La fille de Madame Angot. When this piece went on the road in 1876, he also wrote a companion piece for it called Happy Hampstead, which was set to music by the theatrical agent and composer Richard D'Oyly Carte. Desprez became a close friend of Carte's and worked with him for many years as Carte's secretary.

At the same time Desprez wrote the texts for ten short works for D'Oyly Carte, most of which accompanied the Gilbert and Sullivan operas on the bills at the Opera Comique and later the Savoy Theatre. These pieces had long runs in tandem with, and sometimes beyond, the runs of the principal pieces, and they were usually played on tour throughout Britain as companion pieces, benefit pieces and short-programme items. Working with composers such as Alfred Cellier and Edward Solomon, Desprez became perhaps the most popular librettist of one-act operas in Britain.

The Nautch Girl, 1891

Desprez's most frequently played work was his 1879 two-act musical play, Tita in Thibet, which was later played in the British provinces by the Majilton company more than a thousand times. It was written as a vehicle for the music hall star Kate Santley. W. H. Seymour, who would become the stage manager of the D'Oyly Carte Opera Company for 20 years, also played in the piece. The story concerns an unusual marriage custom purportedly to be found "in out of the way parts of the world" such as Tibet. The customs of the country permit every wife to have four husbands. The reviewer from The Era did not find the piece "refined" enough for his taste.

Desprez's best work as a lyricist was The Nautch Girl, or, The Rajah of Chutneypore, which played at the Savoy Theatre in 1891–92.

=== Poet, essayist, journalist, and editor ===
Desprez' best-known work, however, is a poem, Lasca, about a Mexican girl and her cowboy sweetheart caught in a cattle stampede "in Texas down by the Rio Grande." The ballad-like poem, first published in a London magazine in 1882, has often been reprinted, usually with deletions and changes, and recited in many parts of the English-speaking world. Between 1873 and 1882 at least four other of Desprez's poems had been published, two of which are about Texas.

In 1884, Desprez began writing for The Era, London's foremost theatre paper, and he became its editor in 1893, a position he held until illness forced him to retire in 1913. Desprez also wrote dozens of essays on travel, art, music, and famous personalities that were published in English periodicals, most of them between 1905 and 1914.

Desprez died in London at the age of 63.

== Theatrical Works ==
- 1875 La fille de Madame Angot (Jacques Offenbach), English version (Royalty Theatre)
- 1876 Happy Hampstead (Richard D'Oyly Carte) 1 act, Alexandra Theatre, Liverpool
- 1878 After All! (Alfred Cellier) 1 act, (Opera Comique)
- 1879 Tita in Thibet, a.k.a. Brum, a Birmingham Merchant, Royalty Theatre
- 1880 In the Sulks (Cellier) 1 act, Opera Comique
- 1881 Quite an Adventure (Edward Solomon) 1 act Olympic Theatre; Revived in 1894 (Savoy Theatre)
- 1881 Mock Turtles (Eaton Faning) 1 act, Savoy Theatre
- 1883 Lurette, English version w/ Alfred Murray, H S Leigh (Avenue Theatre)
- 1883 A Private Wire (Percy Reeve/w Arnold Felix) 1 act, Savoy Theatre
- 1885 Round and Square (Solomon) Performed on tour by two touring companies
- 1886 The Carp (Cellier) 1 act Savoy Theatre
- 1888 Mrs. Jarramie's Genie (A. Cellier and Francois Cellier) 1 act Savoy Theatre
- 1889 Delia (Procida Bucalossi) Bristol (as 'F Soulbieu')
- 1891 The Nautch Girl (Solomon and George Dance), Savoy Theatre
- 1892 Brother George (Bucalossi), Portsmouth
