= Sybil Grey =

British singer and actress (1860–1939)

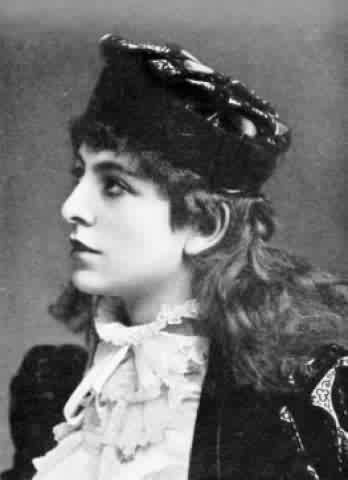
Sybil Grey as Sacharissa in Princess Ida (1884)

Ellen Sophia Taylor (3 January 1860 – 20 August 1939), known professionally as Sybil Grey, was a British singer and actress during the Victorian era best known for creating a series of minor roles in productions by the D'Oyly Carte Opera Company, including roles in several of the famous Gilbert and Sullivan operas, from 1880 to 1888. Afterwards, she went on to a long West End theatre career, appearing in both musical theatre and plays.

== Early life and career ==
Grey was born in London’s Conduit Street West, the second daughter of Henry Taylor, a linen draper, and his Exeter-born wife Susannah. Grey began her stage career with the D'Oyly Carte Opera Company in 1880 as a member of the chorus and understudy during the first London production of Gilbert and Sullivan's The Pirates of Penzance at the Opera Comique, appearing in the small role of Kate for a short period in July 1880. In the company's next opera, Patience, also at the Opera Comique, Grey was in the chorus but may also have understudied the role of Lady Saphir. After Patience moved to the new Savoy Theatre in November 1881, Grey also played the non-singing role of Jane in the curtain raiser Mock Turtles by Frank Desprez and Eaton Faning.

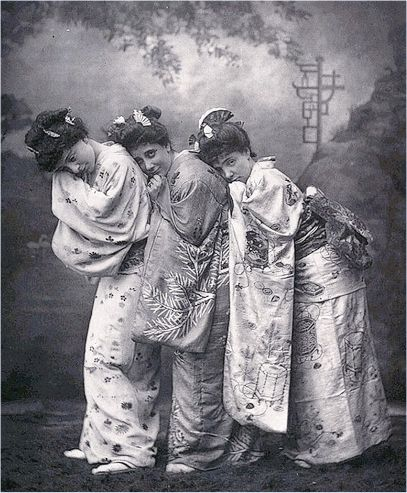
Grey, Braham and Bond in The Mikado

Gilbert and Sullivan's Iolanthe followed at the Savoy in November 1882. Grey created the non-singing role of Fleta, while continuing as Jane in Mock Turtles. When Mock Turtles was replaced by A Private Wire in March 1883, Grey played Mary, the maid. Later that year, she was given the singing role of Leila in Iolanthe. She continued as both Mary and Leila until January 1884, when both operas closed. In the next Gilbert and Sullivan opera, Princess Ida, she created the role of Sacharissa. When that opera closed, she was in the chorus of the revival of The Sorcerer and played the minor role of First Bridesmaid in the accompanying Trial by Jury.

Grey created the role of Peep-Bo, one of the three Little Maids, in the original production of The Mikado, with Jessie Bond (Pitti-Sing) and Leonora Braham (Yum-Yum), for the show's entire run from 1885 to 1887. In an 1885 interview with the New York Daily Tribune, author W. S. Gilbert stated that the short stature of Braham, Bond and Grey "suggested the advisability of grouping them as three Japanese school-girls" referred to in the opera as the 'three little maids'". The Theatre of April 1885 said, "Miss Sybil Grey is one of the valuable recruits above alluded to. She has a pretty voice, her intonation is correct and her appearance attractive."

After this long engagement, Grey withdrew from the D'Oyly Carte Opera Company. After a short tour with May Holt's company, from December 1887, Grey had roles in two musical burlesques by composer Meyer Lutz at the Gaiety Theatre in London, then managed by George Edwardes. One was Vanilla in Frankenstein, or The Vampire's Victim, with a libretto by Richard Henry. The other was as Zillah in Miss Esmeralda, or The Maid and the Monkey, By April 1888, she was also playing Polly in the farce Lot 49, which she also played at a benefit for Nellie Farren. In June 1888, she returned to the Savoy for the first revival of The Mikado, playing her old role of Peep-Bo. During this run, she took roles in two benefit performances of Gilbert's blank verse "fairy plays". The first was Lady Amanthis in Broken Hearts at a charity matinée at the Savoy, in a cast that included Julia Neilson, Richard Temple and Lewis Waller. The other was in The Wicked World, along with George Alexander and Lionel Brough. In September of that year, after the Mikado revival's run ended, she again left the D'Oyly Carte company, never to return.

== Later years ==
After leaving D'Oyly Carte, Grey enjoyed a long West End theatre career. She began with Drury Lane pantomimes, including playing one of the Merry Men in Babes in the Wood in 1888 with Harry Payne, Dan Leno as the Dame, and Harriet Vernon as Robin Hood. She and Rosina Brandram appeared in a musical version of Newport (The Song of the Looking Glass) in a vanity production at Devonshire House. In 1889–1890 Grey continued at Drury Lane as Deborah Wood in The Royal Oak, the Royal Housemaid in Jack and the Beanstalk, and, in Beauty and the Beast as the King of Diamonds. In 1891 she played Alice Ormerod in A Lancashire Sailor, by Brandon Thomas, and Lily Eaton-Belgrave in A Pantomime Rehearsal, both at the Shaftesbury Theatre. She also played the title-role in Nan, the Good-for-Nothing and Lucy Morley in an unsuccessful tryout of a farce called Our Doctors at Terry's Theatre. The following year, she starred as Sally in Crazed and appeared in Faithful James (by B. C. Stephenson), with Ellaline Terriss and Brandon Thomas, both at the Court Theatre. Among other roles, she appeared for Edwardes in his hit musical comedy The Gaiety Girl (1893) and created the part of Jane in the next hit An Artist's Model, where she later took over the role of Madame Amélie (1895). She was next engaged at the Vaudeville Theatre in an English adaptation of the farce L'Hôtel du libre échange called A Night Out. By August 1896 she had been promoted to the leading role of Mme Pinglet. In 1898, she appeared as the scheming servant-girl Durnford in The Dove-Cot (an adaptation of Jalouse) at the Duke of York's Theatre, together with Leonora Braham and starring Seymour Hicks. Subsequently, for Horace Lingard, she played Mrs Smith in Why Smith Left Home, a French comedy, and toured for Edwardes in A Night Out.

In the 1901 census she was listed as an "actress and masseuse". Her acting appearances became fewer in the new century. She was Miss Deare, the postmistress, in a musical comedy, Three Little Maids, in 1902. In 1904, she played Denise in Véronique, at the Apollo Theatre, together with some of her old Savoy colleagues. Her last role may have been as Miao-Yao and Poo–See in See-See in 1906 and in tours of that musical thereafter. In March 1930 Grey participated with Bond and Braham in a Gilbert and Sullivan Society reunion of the original "Three Little Maids from School". In her last years, she lived in Dulwich.

She died at the age of 79 in a nursing home in Forest Hill in 1939. Grey is portrayed in the 1999 film Topsy-Turvy by Cathy Sara.
