= A Private Wire =

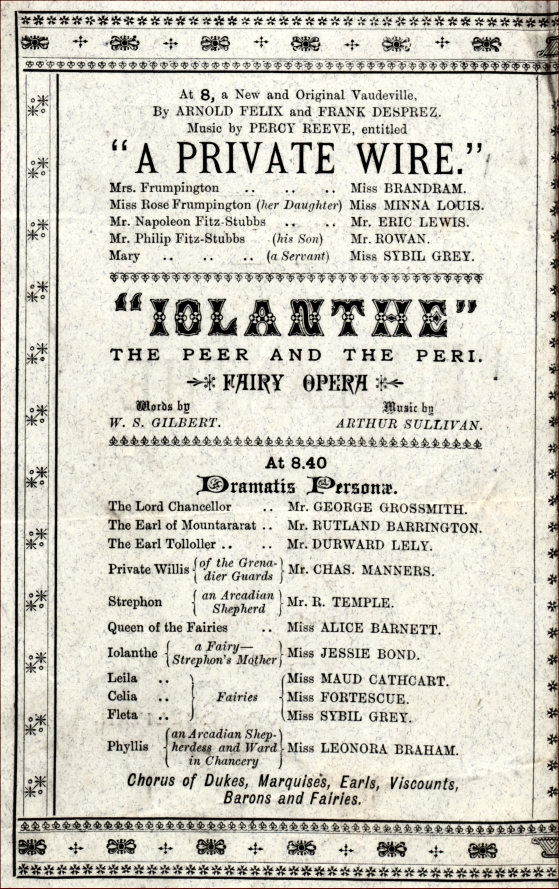
Programme for the 1883 Savoy production

A Private Wire is a one-act musical "vaudeville" operetta with a libretto by Frank Desprez and Arnold Felix and music by Percy Reeve. It was first produced at the Savoy Theatre on 31 March 1883 to 1 January 1884 as a companion piece to Gilbert and Sullivan's Iolanthe. The piece also toured from March to July 1884.

No copy of a printed libretto or vocal score is in the British Library. A copy of the libretto is in the Lord Chamberlain's collection.

== Background ==
The fashion in the late Victorian era was to present long evenings in the theatre, and so producer Richard D'Oyly Carte preceded his Savoy operas with curtain raisers such as A Private Wire. W. J. MacQueen-Pope commented, concerning such curtain raisers:

This was a one-act play, seen only by the early comers. It would play to empty boxes, half-empty upper circle, to a gradually filling stalls and dress circle, but to an attentive, grateful and appreciative pit and gallery. Often these plays were little gems. They deserved much better treatment than they got, but those who saw them delighted in them. ... [They] served to give young actors and actresses a chance to win their spurs ... the stalls and the boxes lost much by missing the curtain-raiser, but to them dinner was more important.

== Synopsis ==
Philip FitzStubbs loves Rose Frumpington who lives in the house on the opposite side of the street. Philip's father has forbidden the match and made his son promise not to see or write to Rose, but Philip has had a telephone installed so that they can talk. FitzStubbs senior hopes to marry Rose's mother. Mrs. Frumpington, a spiritualist, is worried that her late husband may disapprove of her marrying FitzStubbs. Visiting her daughter's house, she is alone in a room and hears a voice evidently talking to her. It is Philip, trying to talk to Rose by telephone, but Mrs. Frumpington assumes it to be the voice of her dead husband. She replies to the voice. Philip, assuming that he is speaking to Rose, becomes increasingly agitated at the strange answers he is getting down the wire, and eventually rushes across the street. All is explained, and finding that there is no spiritual objection, Mrs. Frumpington accepts Fitzstubbs's proposal, and the parents consent to the marriage of their children.

== Roles and original cast ==
- Mrs. Frumpington – Rosina Brandram / Miss Twyman
- Miss Rose Frumpington – Minna Louis / Rose Hervey
- Napoleon FitzStubbs – Eric Lewis
- Philip FitzStubbs – Charles Rowan
- Mary, the maid – Sybil Grey
