= Quite an Adventure =

Comic opera by Edward Solomon and Frank Desprez

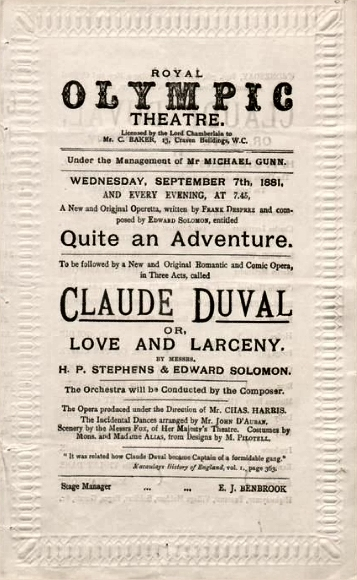
Programme for the London premiere, 1881

Quite an Adventure is a one-act comic opera by Edward Solomon with a libretto by Frank Desprez. The farcical plot concerns a house-guest who mistakes his hostess's husband for an intruder.

The opera's first run in London was under the management of Michael Gunn, but the piece was played by the D'Oyly Carte Opera Company in the 1880s and 1890s as a curtain raiser to full-length Savoy operas, both on tour and later in London.

== Background and productions ==
The fashion in the late Victorian era was to present long evenings in the theatre, and so producer Richard D'Oyly Carte preceded his Savoy operas with curtain raisers such as Quite an Adventure. W. J. MacQueen-Pope commented, concerning such curtain raisers:

This was a one-act play, seen only by the early comers. It would play to empty boxes, half-empty upper circle, to a gradually filling stalls and dress circle, but to an attentive, grateful and appreciative pit and gallery. Often these plays were little gems. They deserved much better treatment than they got, but those who saw them delighted in them. ... [They] served to give young actors and actresses a chance to win their spurs ... the stalls and the boxes lost much by missing the curtain-raiser, but to them dinner was more important.

Quite an Adventure was first produced on tour in the English provinces by the D'Oyly Carte Opera Company as a curtain raiser for H.M.S. Pinafore. The London premiere was at the Olympic Theatre on 7 September 1881, under the management of Michael Gunn, as a companion piece for Solomon's operetta Claude Duval. It ran until the end of October 1881. D'Oyly Carte again toured the piece in tandem with Patience in 1881, and with Pinafore and The Pirates of Penzance in 1882, and 1883.

Quite an Adventure was revived at the Savoy Theatre from 15 December 1894 to 29 December 1894 as a companion piece to The Chieftain. Further provincial performances were given when D'Oyly Carte took The Vicar of Bray and The Chieftain on tour between 1892 and 1895.

A copy of the vocal score (published in 1882 by Chappell & Co.), but no printed libretto, is found in British Library. The score contains music only, no dialogue. A copy of the libretto is in the Lord Chamberlain's collection (filed September/October 1880).

== Synopsis ==
In its review of the London premiere, The Era gave this summary of the plot:

It appears that a young married lady, Mrs. Wallaby, living at Croydon, and always in great fear of burglars, is left alone meditating upon a little adventure she has had at Victoria Station. She had been to an entertainment, and from excitement or fatigue had felt faint, when a benevolent young gentleman, a stranger, came to her assistance. Arriving safely at Croydon, however, she is rather startled at receiving a visitor, no other than the gentleman who had so kindly rendered assistance. The stranger, after an apology for troubling her so late, ultimately explains that he cannot get into his rooms, and is locked out, the fact being that in his desire to hasten her recovery he had put his latch key down the lady's back. With many apologies the gentlemen requests Mrs. Wallaby to shake herself a little in order to discover if she is carrying the latch key about her, and with some confusion the lady consents, and after much comic gesticulation the key eventually falls on the floor. Meanwhile, poor Mr. Fraser, the benevolent owner of the key, hears the shriek and roar of the last train to London, and the rain is coming down in torrents. What is to be done? Mrs. Wallaby has not the heart to turn him out, and so, anticipating her husband's speedy return, she supplies the stranger with brandy and water, cigars, her husband's slippers and dressing gown, and leaves him. Mr. Fraser accordingly makes himself comfortable, takes off his wet coat, and wetter boots, mixes a stiff glass of brandy and water, and waxes enthusiastic respecting the charming young wife. He, however, first hangs up his dripping clothes in the hall, but is speedily startled at hearing footsteps, and presumes this must be the burglar whose appearance Mrs. Wallaby so much dreaded. It is no burglar, but her own husband, who, discovering a man in the house is terribly alarmed. Both the men are desperately afraid of each other, and the situation serves for the introduction of an amusing duet. In the height of their excitement a policeman enters. He has been waiting for an interview with the cook, and wonders that the siren of the kitchen is so long in coming to meet him. Curious to ascertain the cause of the delay, he comes cautiously into the house through the French windows opening on the garden, and immediately pounces upon the two men. Mr. Fraser, the owner of the latch key, at once gives the husband in charge; but Mrs. Wallaby enters, and explains, and all ends happily, the stranger being invited to spend the remainder of the night with them.

== Cast ==
Original 1881 London cast

- Mr. Wallaby – Charles Ashford
- Mr. Fraser – Arthur Williams
- Policeman – Fred Solomon
- Mrs. Wallaby – Edith Blande

1883 Touring cast

- Mr. Wallaby – A. Loraine
- Mr. Fraser – R. Christian
- Policeman – Edgar Manning
- Mrs. Wallaby – Florence Harcourt

1894 Savoy cast

- Mr. Wallaby – Robert Rous
- Mr. Fraser – Henri Delplanque
- Police Officer – Albert E. Rees
- Mrs. Wallaby – Re Stephanie
