= Bucalossi =

Bucalossi (lit. 'bone-piercer') is an Italian surname from Tuscany. Notable people with the surname include:

- Procida (1832–1918) and Ernest Bucalossi (1863–1933), British-Italian composers and arrangers
- Pietro Bucalossi (1905–1992), Italian physician and politician
