= Mock turtle (disambiguation) =

Mock Turtle is a fictional character from Alice's Adventures in Wonderland.

Mock turtle, Mockturtle or Mock Turtle(s) may refer to:

- Mock turtle soup
- 8889 Mockturtle, a minor planet named after the fictional character
- Mock Turtles (opera), 1881
- The Mock Turtles, an English indie rock band
- Mock turtle neck, a garment style
