= Rudall Carte =

British flute maker (1820–1955)

- Formerly: Rudall & Rose (1822–1852); Rudall, Rose, Carte & Co. (1852–1872); Rudall, Carte & Co. (1872–1955)
- Type: Subsidiary
- Founded: 1820; 206 years ago
- Defunct: 1955
- Headquarters: Edgware, London, England
- Products: Musical instruments
- Parent: Boosey & Hawkes

Rudall, Carte & Co. (commonly known as Rudall Carte) was a British flute maker based in London, England.

== History ==
Rudall Carte traces its roots back to 1820, with George Rudall (1781–1871), a flute teacher in London, supplying instruments made for John Willis. In 1821, Rudall joined Edinburgh flute maker John Mitchell Rose and formed Rudall & Rose in 1822, setting up a workshop in London. In 1850, Richard Carte, a student of Rudall, joined the company and formed Rudall, Rose, Carte & Co. in 1852. Carte persuaded Rudall to make Theobald Boehm's early conical flutes. Rudall Carte acquired the British rights to make Boehm's patent. In 1862, the company began making brass instruments with Samson's patent for finger-slide valves. In 1872, the company was renamed Rudall, Carte & Co. In 1883, Henry Carte had taken over his father's business, and sold it as a limited company by 1911.

Rudall Carte patented flute designs based on both the simple system and Boehm systems, including the Carte's "old system" flute, the 1851 system and the 1867 system.

During the early years of World War II, the company ceased production of brass instruments in 1939, and it was acquired by Boosey & Hawkes. It ceased flute making production in 1955.
