= The Nautch Girl =

Opera by George Dance, Frank Desprez and Edward Solomon

Solomon (c), with Gilbert (l) and Sullivan irate at his success at the Savoy

The Nautch Girl, or, The Rajah of Chutneypore is a comic opera in two acts, with music by Edward Solomon, a book by George Dance, and lyrics by Dance and Frank Desprez. It opened on 30 June 1891 at the Savoy Theatre, managed by Richard D'Oyly Carte, and ran until 16 January 1892, for a respectable 200 performances, and then Carte toured the piece in the British provinces and colonies.

The cast included several players familiar to the Savoy's audiences: Courtice Pounds (Indru), Frank Thornton (Pyjama), W. H. Denny (Bumbo), Frank Wyatt (Baboo Currie) and Rutland Barrington (Punka, replaced by W. S. Penley, when Barrington left the company for several months to tour in a series of "musical duologues" with Jessie Bond). The part of Chinna Loofa was the last role that Jessie Bond created at the Savoy. She wrote in her memoirs that it was one of her favourites. The title role was played by Lenore Snyder, the last of a number of actresses who had played Gianetta in The Gondoliers. The opera has been absent from the professional stage since the 19th century but has been revived occasionally by amateur companies.

Carte authorized his American producing partner, John Stetson, to mount the opera in the United States, but Rudolph Aronson claimed that he had an ongoing right of first refusal to produce any new Solomon works in the US and threatened a lawsuit; neither of them produced the piece. The Nautch Girl received its only known North American performances on 7 and 8 August 2004, in an incomplete version by the Royal English Opera Company of Rockford, Illinois.

== Background ==
Caricature of Solomon (r) with Richard D'Oyly Carte, 1891

When the Gilbert and Sullivan partnership disbanded after the production of The Gondoliers in 1889, impresario Richard D'Oyly Carte was forced to find new works to present at the Savoy Theatre. This was the first non-Gilbert and Sullivan "Savoy Opera", but it was designed to resemble its G&S predecessors, in particular The Mikado, with its exotic oriental setting. The Times review of 1 July 1891 noted:

Both Mr. George Dance and Mr. Edward Solomon have ... subordinated their own individualities to the traditions of the theatre, and have produced a work which, if brought out anonymously, would be unhesitatingly classed, by superficial observers at all events, among the rest of the "Gilbert and Sullivan" operas. It may, indeed, be doubted whether the older collaborators would have followed their own example so closely as their successors have done.

Carte knew Solomon well, and he had presented Solomon's 1881 comic opera, Claude Duval, on tour in 1882. In 1893, Solomon's Billee Taylor (originally produced in 1880), also joined the D'Oyly Carte repertoire. Desprez had written several curtain raisers for the Savoy during the 1880s. Dance was the younger collaborator, and later he was responsible for the phenomenally successful musical A Chinese Honeymoon, which ran for more than a thousand performances at the turn of the century. Nellie Stewart was originally cast as Hollee Beebee, the title character, but she "resigned" the role a month before the show opened.

== Synopsis ==
Punka, the rajah of Chutneypore, is soft-hearted. His life is beset by many problems, including the love of his son, Indru, for the nautch dancer Hollee Beebee; Punka's sponging relatives, especially the scheming Vizier Pyjama; and a missing diamond that serves as the national idol's right eye. Indru is a Brahmin, a high caste, and Beebee, who used to be a Brahmin, is of a low caste due to a legal decision that is being appealed. Therefore, they cannot marry. Indru renounces his caste (by eating cow meat) and his royal position to become Beebee's equal, so they can marry. Punka chastises Beebee for seeking the love of one whose caste is above hers. Punka also notes that his meddling relative, Pyjama, stole the idol's eye and then lost it, but that he cannot harm his relative. Just then, Pyjama announces with great amusement that Beebee has won the court appeal and is now a Brahmin; and so now she is a Brahmin, but Indru is not. The law condemns both a Brahmin and his or her lower caste spouse to a traitor's death. Beebee escapes to Europe with the dance troupe, but when Indru tries to join the girls, he is imprisoned under threat of execution.

Pyjama, scheming to become the rajah, has put an anonymous letter on the idol's shrine informing Punka that Indru is a condemned man. The father of a condemned man may not be rajah. Chinna Loofah, a woman seeking a husband, has an affection for Indru (and nearly every other man), and she breaks him out of jail. Indru hides as a miracle is announced: Bumbo, the two-thousand-year-old idol, has stepped down from his place. Bumbo is looking for his diamond eye and the villain who stole it. He complains about the neglect of his worship and dismisses Punka as rajah (and condemns him and all his relations to death by crocodile), replacing him with Pyjama (although, being kin, Pyjama also would be condemned). However, Bumbo spots Chinna, and they very soon find themselves discussing marriage.

Beebee returns from a personally triumphant European tour, carrying a curious gem on her necklace that had been left for her at a stage door by an admirer, and looks for her Indru. Pyjama claims that he is exempt from the family execution, saying that he is not a relation of Punka's; he had merely claimed to be in order to get promotion. Beebee and her girlfriends divert Pyjama with one of their dance numbers so that he is late for the executions, angering Bumbo. Punka announces that Pyjama is the thief who stole the idol's diamond eye. As Pyjama is dragged away to his fate, Beebee and Chinna beg for mercy. Bumbo sees the twinkling diamond around Beebee's neck – it is Bumbo's lost eye. Punka and Indru are restored to their former positions, and Indru and Beebee can fall into each other's arms. The idol climbs back onto his shelf with Chinna turned to wood alongside him, and all ends happily (except for Pyjama).

== Roles ==
Lenore Snyder as Hollee Beebee

Role	Voice type	Original cast 30 June 1891
Punka, the Rajah of Chutneypore	baritone	Rutland Barrington
Indru, his son	tenor	Courtice Pounds
Pyjama, the Grand Vizier	comic baritone	Frank Thornton
Chinna Loofa, a poor relation of Punka's	mezzo-soprano	Jessie Bond
Suttee and Cheetah, poor relations of Punka's	sopranos	Cissie Saumarez and Nellie Lawrence
Baboo Currie, proprietor of a Nautch troupe	baritone	Frank Wyatt
Hollee Beebee, the Nautch girl	soprano	Lenore Snyder
Banyan, Kalee and Tiffin, Nautch girls		Louie Rowe, Annie Cole and Cora Tinnie
Bumbo, an Idol	bass-baritone	W. H. Denny
Chorus of Nautch Girls, Ladies of the Court, Soldiers, Priests, Coolies, Pariahs, etc.

== Musical numbers ==
Act I

1. Beneath the Sky of Blue – Opening Chorus (Pariahs)
2. Bow Not, Good People (Indru)
3. The Sun Was Setting (Indru and Pariahs)
4. Roses are Fair (Indru, Baboo Currie and Pariahs)
5. With Merry Song (Banyan, Tiffin, Kalee and Nautch Girls)
6. One, Two, Three (Hollee Beebee and Nautch Girls)
7. When Our Shackles Are Undone (Beebee, Indru)
8. The Rajah of Chutneypore (Punka and Chorus)
9. Quite Another Different Kind of Person Altogether (Punka, Beebee, Pyjama, Chinna)
10. Do Not Think Me Overbold (Chinna and Punka)
11. Merrily, Merrily Ring the Bells (Chorus)
12. Beebee's a Bride (Indru, Beebee, Chorus)
13. What is caste to you and me? (Indru, Beebee and Ensemble)

Act II

1. Entr'acte
2. We Are Punka's Poor Relations (Chinna, Cheetah, Suttee and relations)
3. The Secret of My Past Success (Pyjama and relations)
4. Duet: A Little Caged Bird (Chinna, Indru)
5. Bow Ye People (Chorus)
6. As I Sat on My Shelf (Bumbo and Chorus)
7. When a Fashionable Tenor (Bumbo and Chorus)
8. Hymn to Bumbo (Chorus)
9. Vive la Liberté (Bumbo, Chinna)
10. Crocodile (Punka, Bumbo and Chinna)
11. Near thee Once More (Beebee)
12. When All the World Was Bright, Love (Indru and Beebee)
13. If We Travel by Way of Brindisi (Baboo Currie, Beebee, Banyan, Tiffin, Kalee, Indru and Punka)
14. Gently bear my lady to her chamber (Beebee, Banyan, Tiffin, Kalee, Currie, Pyjama and Chorus)
15. Finale (Ensemble)

=== Critical response ===
The reviews were generally favourable. The Daily News gave the show a good review, though noting that Solomon did not aspire to Sullivan's "refined melodic inspiration and delicately-finished orchestration", and commenting on a certain monotony in the score caused by an excess of drawing room songs and waltzes. The Pall Mall Gazette considered Dance and Desprez sensible to have modelled their work on that of W.S. Gilbert, and praised Solomon's score for its tunes and for the extravagant orchestration. The Morning Post was not greatly impressed by the score, and referred the opera's "ghastly attempt at humour", but praised the staging and the cast. The Era considered that Carte and his authors and composer had done well to present the Savoy audience with a piece in the familiar Savoy genre without direct imitation of Gilbert and Sullivan. The paper praised the music and libretto, but reserved its highest praise for Carte's production, which "surpassed all previous effects at the Savoy." The review concluded, If The Nautch Girl is less striking and original than some of its predecessors at the Savoy it has merits of its own which the public are not likely to ignore." The least favourable critique was that of George Bernard Shaw, in The World:

Nothing in The Nautch Girl sustains the orchestral traditions of comic opera – the delicacy and humor of Auber, the inimitable effervescence of Offenbach, or the musicianly smoothness and charm of Sullivan and Cellier. … All this may seem rather hard on poor Mr Solomon, the composer upon whom Mr Carte's choice has actually fallen. But then Mr. Solomon has been very hard on me. He has given me the worst headache I ever had in a theatre by an instrumental score which is more wearisome than the conversation of an inveterate punster, and more noisy than the melodrame which accompanies the knockabout business in a music hall. … Of the opera as an artistic whole I cannot very well speak, because it hardly is an artistic whole. The book was evidently selected for the sake of its resemblance to The Mikado, of which it might almost be called a paraphrase … the utmost that can be said for The Nautch Girl amounts to no more than can be said for any piece at the Lyric or the Prince of Wales. In other words, the Savoy has lost its speciality. This, I think, is a misfortune; and if Mr. Carte wishes to remedy it, and cannot discover two new geniuses, he had better make up his mind at once to give a commission to Mr. Grundy for his next libretto, and to Mr. Stanford or Mr. Cowen for his next score.
