= Edward Solomon =

English composer, conductor and musician

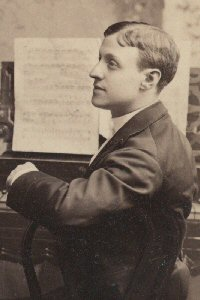
Edward Solomon

Edward Solomon (25 July 1855 – 22 January 1895) was an English composer, conductor, orchestrator and pianist. He died at age 39 by which time he had written dozens of works produced for the stage, including several for the D'Oyly Carte Opera Company, including The Nautch Girl (1891). Early in his career, he was a frequent collaborator of Henry Pottinger Stephens. He had a bigamous marriage with Lillian Russell in the 1880s.

== Life and career ==
Edward ("Teddy") Solomon was born in Lambeth, London, to a Jewish family. He had ten siblings. His parents were Charles Solomon (1817–1890), a music hall pianist, conductor and composer, and his wife, Cesira "Sarah" Marinina, née Mirandoli (1834–1891). He picked up music by working with his father.

Aged 17 or 18, Solomon married 15-year-old Jane Isaacs in 1873, and the two had a daughter, Claire Romaine (1873–1964), who became an actress, but Solomon soon deserted Isaacs and, over the years, took a series of mistresses. Isaacs later sang under the stage name Lily Grey.

=== Early career ===
His first comic opera was A Will With a Vengeance (1876), a one-act work with a libretto by Frederick Hay, based on La Vendetta. This was produced at the Globe Theatre. In 1879, he met Henry Pottinger "Pot" Stephens while he was the musical director at the Royalty Theatre conducting, among other works, Arthur Sullivan's The Zoo. With Stephens, he produced his first successes, Billee Taylor (1880), a "nautical comedy opera" in two acts; and Claude Duval (1881, celebrating a well known 18th century highwayman), both of which remained popular for many years in both the UK and US. Other Solomon and Stephens pieces were Lord Bateman, or Picotee's Pledge (1882), Virginia and Paul, or Ringing the Changes (1883) and later The Red Hussar (1889), a "comedy opera" in three acts. Together, they would also write Popsy Wopsy, a "musical absurdity" (1880) and Pocahontas (1884).

Solomon also wrote the music for the short companion pieces Quite an Adventure (1881; Olympic Theatre; revived in 1894 at the Savoy Theatre) and Round and Square (1885), each with a libretto by Frank Desprez, and each produced on tour by D'Oyly Carte companies in the 1880s and 1890s. Other early shows included Love and Larceny in 1881, a farce, Through the Looking-Glass (1882), The Vicar of Bray, a comic opera with a libretto by Sydney Grundy (1882; revived 1892 at the Savoy), the successful Polly, or The Pet of the Regiment (1884) and Pepita; or, the Girl with the Glass Eyes (1886). He also wrote ballads like "I Should Like To" and "Over the Way", and numerous salon piano solos and arrangements. For instance, he arranged George Grossmith's "See Me Dance the Polka" for piano.

=== Later career ===
Caricature of Solomon (r) with Richard D'Oyly Carte, 1891

With F. C. Burnand, Solomon wrote Pickwick (1889), which also had a run in 1894, Domestic Economy (1890), and "The Tiger" (1890). Burnand's contribution to the last of these was so unacceptable that the work was hissed off the stage on its opening night. Pickwick was recorded by Retrospect Opera in 2016, together with George Grossmith's Cups and Saucers.

From 1891–93, after Gilbert and Sullivan had temporarily separated, Richard D'Oyly Carte mounted a number of non-G&S pieces to keep the Savoy Theatre open, including a revival of The Vicar of Bray in 1892. Solomon's most famous work produced by the D'Oyly Carte Opera Company was probably The Nautch Girl or, The Rajah of Chutneypore (1891), an "Indian comic opera" in two acts with a libretto by George Dance, and lyrics by Dance and Frank Desprez. It initially ran for 200 performances at the Savoy Theatre and then toured. The company also toured The Vicar of Bray.

His last stage work was On the March (1896), a musical comedy in two acts, with John Crook and Frederic Clay, to a libretto by William Yardley, B. C. Stephenson and Cecil Clay, based on In Camp by Victoria Vokes.

=== Bigamous marriage and personal information ===
Solomon has been described as "a diminutive clean-shaven young man ... whimsical, flamboyant, superstitious, hardly to be trusted with money or women, but brimming with melodic invention and able to compose at speed." He met the American actress Lillian Russell, in 1882 at Tony Pastor's New York Casino Theatre where he was the season's musical director and she became the star. Unaware of his first marriage she became his mistress. Subsequently, they sailed together to London, where she starred in several of his works, written specifically for her, including Virginia, Billee Taylor, Polly and Pocahontas. These were not highly successful in Britain, so they returned to America, where Russell was very well received in these works. They had a daughter together, Dorothy, in 1884, and married in New Jersey in 1885. The relationship soured, mostly due to Solomon's poor finances, and their last show, The Maid and the Moonshiner (1886) was a flop. When creditors sued Solomon, he fled the country.

Solomon was arrested in London in 1886 for bigamy, but the case against him collapsed, as no American witnesses came forward. When she learned of his previous marriage, Russell sued for divorce, finally obtaining it in 1893. Meanwhile, Solomon's first wife divorced him in 1887. In 1889 he married an actress, Kate Everleigh. His brother Frederick Solomon acted in several of his works and became a theatre composer, librettist and director.

Solomon died in London of typhoid fever in 1895 at the age of 39.

== Selected operas by Solomon ==
- Billee Taylor (1880)
- Quite an Adventure (1881)
- Claude Duval (1881)
- The Vicar of Bray (1882)
- The Red Hussar (1889)
- The Nautch Girl (1891)
