= Richard Carte =

English musician and flute-maker (1808–1891)

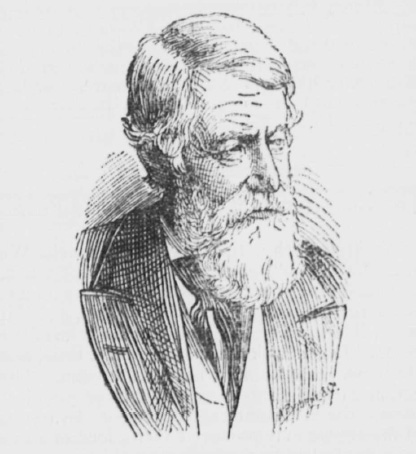
Richard Carte

Richard Carte (né Cart; 23 February 1808 – 1891) was an English flute-maker, flautist and composer. One of his sons was the impresario Richard D'Oyly Carte, producer of the Gilbert and Sullivan operas.

== Life and career ==
Carte was born Richard Cart on 23 February 1808 in Silchester, Hampshire. He studied with George Rudall on an eight key "Nicholson" flute. By 1824 he was giving concerts in London both as a soloist and an orchestra player.

Carte married Eliza Carte (née Jones); the couple eloped, to the disappointment of her father, Thomas Jones, a clergyman. Two of their six children, Henry W. Carte (1856–1926) and Richard D'Oyly Carte, became important in their own fields: the first as flute-maker and the second for staging the Gilbert and Sullivan comic operas. The other children were Blanche (1846–1935), Viola (1848–1925), Rose (1854–1940) and Eliza (1860–1941).

Carte was a popular lecturer on the development of the flute and was secretary of the newly founded "London Society of Amateur Flautists" in 1866. He was a friend of Louis Spohr, and in 1843 was a member of Jullien's famous band. At the height of his career (1844), he adopted Theobald Boehm's flute with the open G-sharp, and two years later brought out a manual for it, the copyright for which he sold for £100. His best-known flute pupil was Richard Shepherd Rockstro.

In 1850, he became a partner at the prominent flute-making firm of Rudall, Rose & Co., instigating many improvements and additions to the Boehm system, which culminated in his popular 1867 model. After he became a partner in the business, it changed its name to Rudall, Rose, Carte and Co. and later to Rudall, Carte & Co.

== Compositions ==
- Complete Instruction for the Boehm flute (1845)
- Concertants Duets for two flutes
- Fantasias
- Grands Solos for flute and piano
