= Mock Turtles (opera) =

Savoy Theatre programme for Mock Turtles

Mock Turtles is a one-act comic opera with a libretto by Frank Desprez and music by Eaton Faning. It was first produced at the Savoy Theatre on 11 October 1881 as a curtain raiser to Patience, then from 26 November 1882 to 30 March 1883 with Iolanthe. The piece also toured from December 1881 throughout 1882. It also toured in 1883 and 1884 and enjoyed further revivals, including a tour in 1897 with J. M. Gordon and his company.

A vocal score was published by Chappells, in 1882, which contains full dialogue as well as music. A copy is in the British Library. The libretto to Mock Turtles was republished by The Gaiety journal in September 2001.

The fashion in the late Victorian era was to present long evenings in the theatre, and so producer Richard D'Oyly Carte preceded his Savoy operas with curtain raisers such as Mock Turtles. W. J. MacQueen-Pope commented, concerning such curtain raisers:

This was a one-act play, seen only by the early comers. It would play to empty boxes, half-empty upper circle, to a gradually filling stalls and dress circle, but to an attentive, grateful and appreciative pit and gallery. Often these plays were little gems. They deserved much better treatment than they got, but those who saw them delighted in them. ... [They] served to give young actors and actresses a chance to win their spurs ... the stalls and the boxes lost much by missing the curtain-raiser, but to them dinner was more important.

== Synopsis ==
Mr. and Mrs. Wranglebury quarrel like two tigers whenever they are together. Things come to a head when Mrs. Wranglebury's mother comes unexpectedly to stay with them. Mr. Wranglebury borrowed money from his mother-in-law many years ago to start his business, and he is fearful that she may ask for it back. They pretend to be very amiable and discover that they really prefer being amiable to each other and want to live happily together. When the servant Jane nearly spoils everything by telling the mother-in-law of the quarrels, she is branded a liar and sacked on the spot.

== Musical numbers ==
- No. 1 - Duet - Mr. and Mrs. Wranglebury - "Oh! I hate you, I despise you..."
- No. 2 - Song - Mrs. Boucher, with Mr. and Mrs. Wranglebury - "I mean to go about, my dears..."
- No. 3 - Duet - Mr. and Mrs. Wranglebury - "I love you so..."
- No. 4 - Finale - Mr. and Mrs. Wranglebury and Mrs. Boucher - "We mean to see the Abbey..."

== Cast information ==
The original cast was:

- Mr. Wranglebury. Courtice Pounds (baritone) (his first principal role with the company)
- Mrs. Wranglebury. Minna Louis/Rose Hervey (soprano)
- Mrs. Bowcher. Rosina Brandram (contralto)
- Jane (non singing). Sybil Grey

Arthur Law and Eric Lewis each replaced Pounds for part of the run.
