= The Gay Parisienne =

The Gay Parisienne [U.S. name:] The Girl from Paris
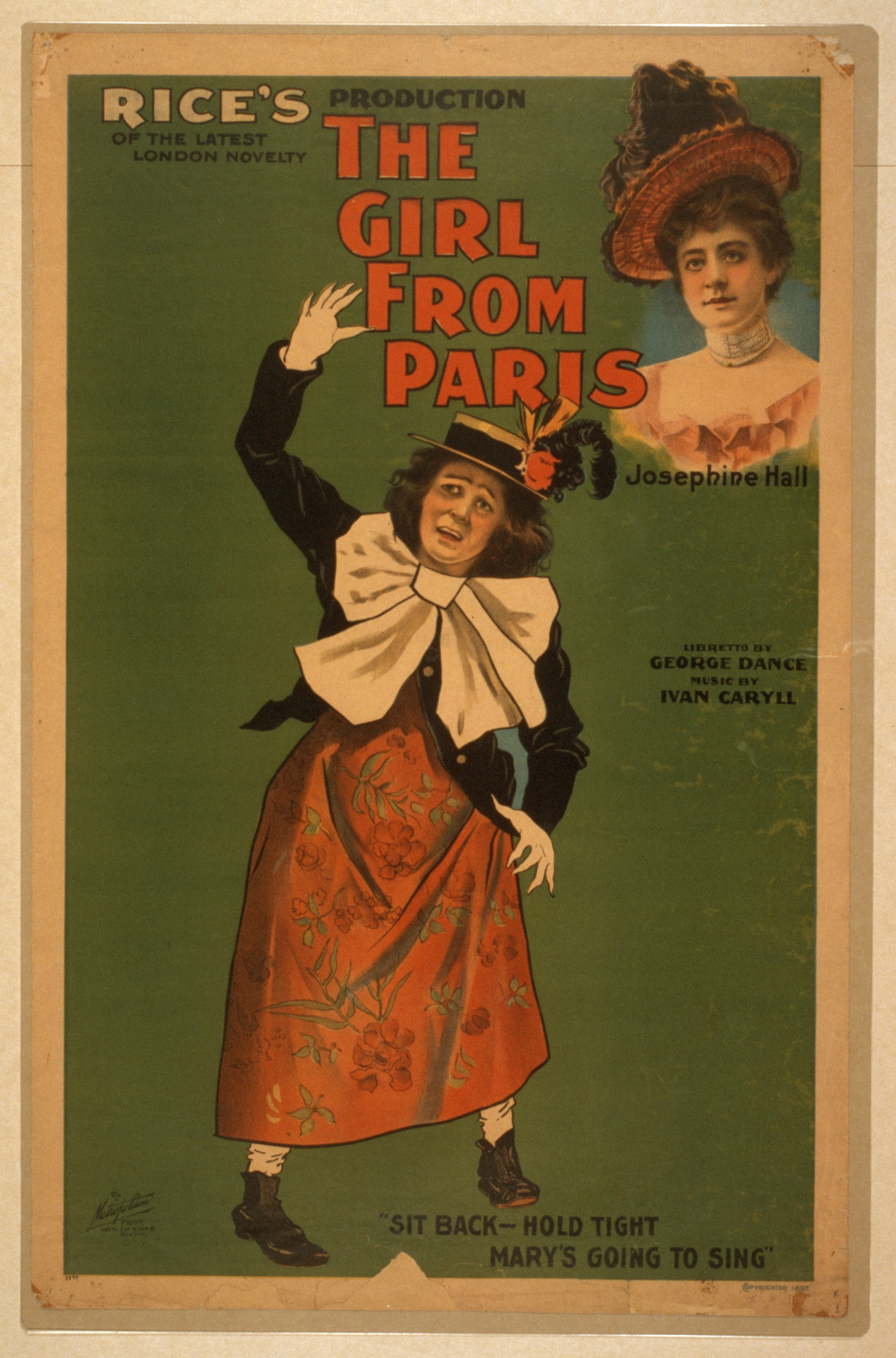
- 1896 Broadway poster
- Music: Ivan Caryll
- Lyrics: George Dance
- Book: George Dance
- Productions: 1894 Northampton, England; 1896 West End; 1896 Broadway

The Gay Parisienne is an Edwardian musical comedy in two acts with a libretto by George Dance. It premiered at the Opera House in Northampton, England, in October 1894, with music by Ernest Rousden. It was revived in London (after a tryout in a smaller London theatre in March 1896) on 4 April 1896, with music by Ivan Caryll, where it ran for 369 performances at the Duke of York's Theatre, starring W. H. Denny as Major Fossdyke, Frank Wheeler as Auguste and Ada Reeve as Julie.

The piece toured internationally, adapted in New York with new songs and material by Edgar Smith and Nat. D. Mann as The Girl from Paris, opening on 8 December 1896, at the Herald Square Theatre and running for 266 or 281 performances (sources differ) and then touring. This was the first of about 250 productions in America directed by Frank Smithson, many of them for Broadway. Smithson also portrayed Major Fossdyke in the Broadway cast, and Josephine Hall, as the servant Ruth, achieved fame for her performance of the song "Sister Mary Jane's Top Note". The Girl from Paris was later revived at Wallack's Theatre in New York. The original version played on the European continent and Australia as The Gay Parisienne.

== Roles ==
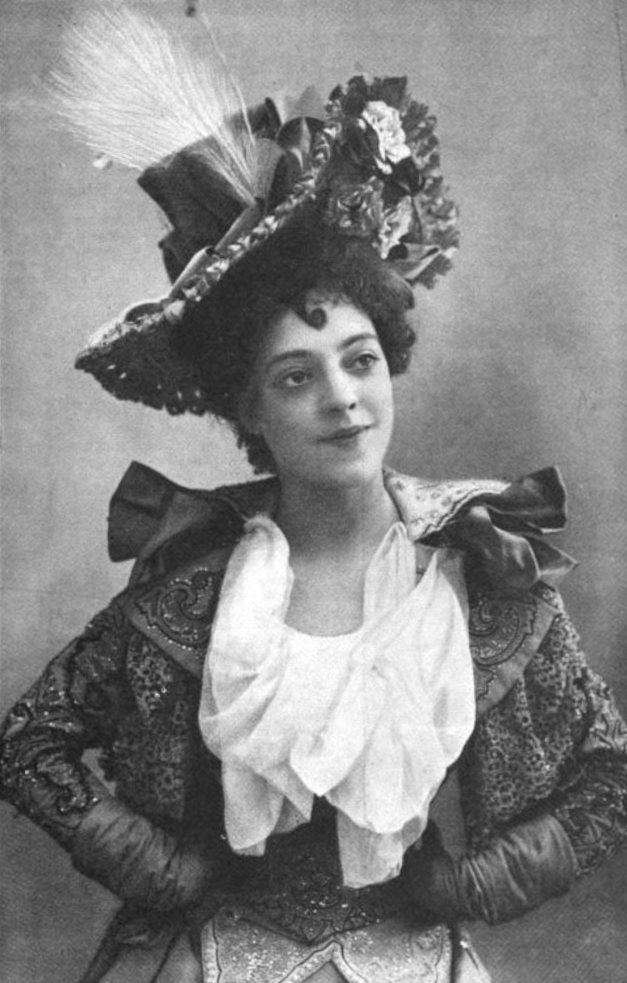
Ada Reeve in the title role

- Mr. Ebenezer Honeycomb – Lionel Rignold
- Mrs. Honeycomb – Lily Belmore
- Amos Dingle, Honeycomb's friend – Hubert Willis
- Nora Honeycomb – Violet Robinson
- Mabel, Nora's friend – Marion Dolby
- Mlle. Julie Bon Bon, The Gay Perisienne – Ada Reeve
- Tom Everleigh, A barrister – Edgar Stevens
- Ruth, Honeycomb's servant – Louie Freear
- M. Auguste Pompier, A French spy – Frank Wheeler
- Major Fossdyke, of the Battersea Butterfly Shooters – W. H. Denny
- Ethel, Angela, Edith, Violet, May, Gladys, Rose and Maud, The Major's daughters – E. Carlton, Violet Ellicott, Rose Montgomery, Ivy Hertzog, Edith Stuart, Edith Bartlett, Maud Hoppe and Edith Mada
- Blatterwater, A gendarme – Mr. Ackerman May
- Gretchen – Harriet Wood
- Hans, Proprietor of the Spa Hotel, Schoffenburgen – Harry Kilburn
- Anna and Fritz, Servants – Edith Milton and Mr. Garth
- Cecil Smyth and Percy Tooting, Ducle's friends – P. Leslie and C. Guildford
- Algernon P. Ducle, An American – James Francis

== Synopsis ==
Mr. Honeycomb is restrained and decorous while in England but abroad, he is unfettered, including on a trip to Paris. Mlle. Julie Bon-Bon of Paris sues him for breach of promise. Afraid of his wife's wrath, Honeycomb flees to Switzerland and is reported drowned. His supposed widow seeks his remains, accompanied by her friend, Major Fossdyke. Meanwhile, Honeycomb sees them together in Switzerland, and pretending righteous anger, he turns the tables.

== Musical numbers ==
Act I

- Hail for the Thames on a Summer's Day—Chorus
- So Take You a Warning—Ebenezer Honeycomb and Chorus
- Somebody—Tom Everleigh and Nora Honeycomb
- The Battersea Butterfly Shooters—Major Fossdyke and Chorus
- I'm All the Way from Gay Paree—Mlle. Julie Bon Bon and Auguste Pompier
- Then Off We Go
- Tweedledum and Tweedledee—Ebenezer and Julie
- Cock-a-doodle—Julie, Auguste, Mrs. Honeycomb and Ebenezer
- Hail, the Hero of the Day—Chorus

Act II

- Isn't It Wonderful—Chorus
- The Festive Continong—Tom, Percy Tooting, Cecil Smyth and Algernon P. Ducle
- First and Third—Ebenezer and Julie
- Sister Mary Jane's Top Note—Ruth and Chorus
- Oh, Tender Remembrance—Nora and Chorus
- Tootle, Tootle—Mrs. Honeycomb, Major Fossdyke, Ruth and Auguste
- Ding-Dong
- Upon the Stage Let's Have a Fling—Ruth and Major Fossdyke
- Carnival—Chorus
- Just for a Kiss
- The Girl from Paris
- He Took It In a Good-natured Way
