= Percy Reeve =

English composer and music critic

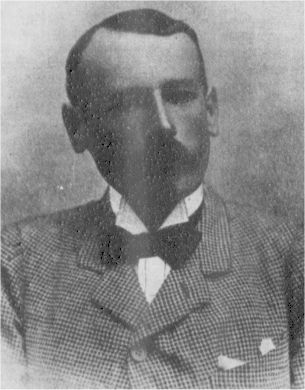
Reeve in 1899

Percy Reeve (born 21 December 1855; date of death not known) was an English composer and music critic. Reeve wrote several successful operettas, often as companion pieces to longer works, as well as music for other theatrical pieces and serious music during the last two decades of the 19th century. As a music critic, he wrote extensively for Punch, The Saturday Review and other publications.

== Life and career ==
He was born in Harley Street, London, the son of a clergyman. He was educated at Eton and the London Academy of Music. In 1877 he was appointed to a civil service post in the Lord Chancellor's office, composing music in his spare time.

Reeve's operetta A Private Wire (1883) ran for more than nine months at the Savoy Theatre as a Curtain raiser to Iolanthe. The same year, he wrote Love & Music, a book of poetry. He later composed the music for "Ruddy George, or Robin Redbreast", at Toole's Theatre (1887; a burlesque of Gilbert and Sullivan's Ruddigore) to a libretto by H. G. F. Taylor. In 1888, Reeve wrote about his old school in "An Eton Half Holiday". His operetta The Crusader and the Craven (1890), with words by W. Allison, had a long run at the Globe Theatre (opening as an afterpiece to an operatic adaptation of The Black Rover) due to its "bright and taking music", despite a libretto described by a later critic as "almost heroically banal", with lines such as, "I am a fierce crusader, a terror to each foe, to infidel invader, I carry death and woe". He contributed to Cupid & Co. in 1894. Reeve also wrote music for burlesques at the Gaiety Theatre and incidental music for West End plays, as well as serious chamber works, and songs to texts by a wide range of authors, from Théophile Gautier to E. Nesbit to Henry Pottinger Stephens.

Reeve was also a prolific musical journalist, contributing to a wide range of publications including Punch, The Saturday Review and The Daily Telegraph. In 1896 he was appointed editor of The Lute, a music magazine. After Reeve's death, Lord Northcliffe recalled him in The Musical Times: "He was on my staff for a time, as musical critic; sensitive little man, with beautiful hands – irritable!"

As a fluent French speaker, he was responsible for the English translation used by F. C. Burnand, and the lyrics, for Edmond Audran's Miss Helyett (1890), staged successfully in London as Miss Decima in 1891.
