= George Dance (dramatist) =

English librettist, lyricist and theatrical manager (1857–1932)

George Dance, c. 1900

Sir George Dance (14 October 1857 – 22 October 1932) was an English lyricist and librettist in the 1890s and an important theatrical manager at the beginning of the 20th century.

Dance wrote several hit musicals, including The Gay Parisienne (1894) and A Chinese Honeymoon (1899), one of the most successful musicals in history until the 1940s. In the early years of the 20th century, he became one of the most successful theatrical managers in the United Kingdom, managing many productions both on the West End and on tour.

== Biography ==
Dance was born in Nottingham, England, the son of Isaac Dance (1824–1880) a pipe maker. Dance was educated at the National School, Sneinton, Nottingham. He married Grace Spong in 1898, and the couple produced two sons (Eric and James) and a daughter (Phyllis, later Mrs. Bertram Merritt). His son Eric, who died in a Japanese prison camp during World War II, contributed a large part of his inheritance towards the building of the Oxford Playhouse, which opened in 1938.

=== Career ===
Early in his career, Dance was a journalist and prolific songwriter. Some of his most famous songs were for the music hall, including "Girls are the Ruin of Men", one of Vesta Tilley's successes, "Come Where Me Booze is Cheaper", "Angels without Wings" (also sung by Tilly), and "His Lordship Winked at the Counsel" (sung by Harry Rickards).

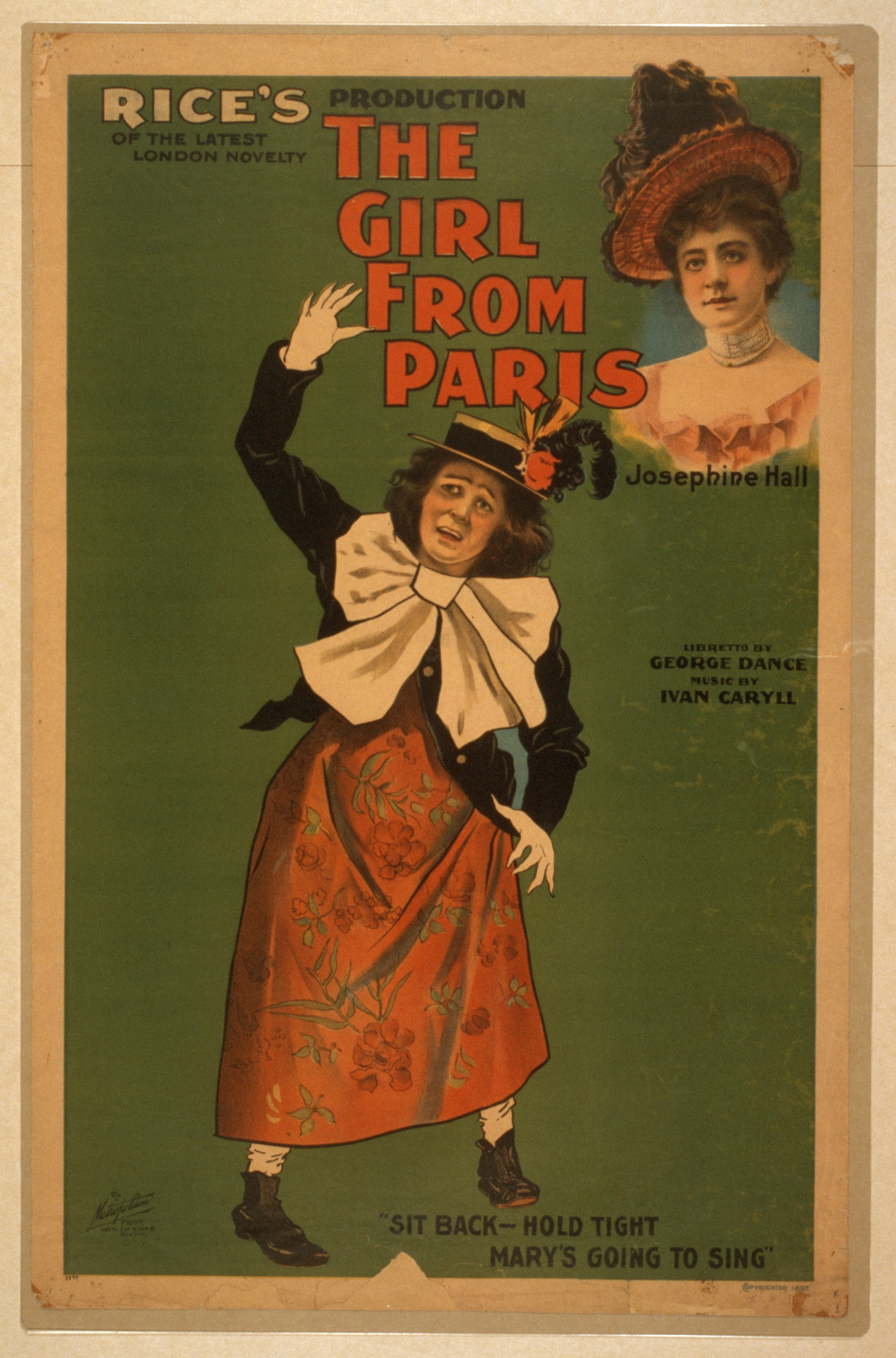
Poster from The Girl from Paris, 1897

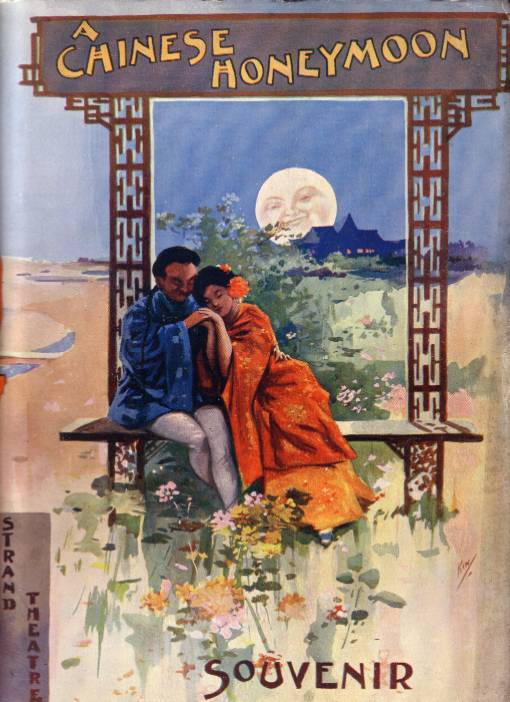
2nd Anniversary Souvenir of A Chinese Honeymoon

In the 1890s, he turned to writing libretti for light operas and musical comedies and producing musical comedies. His works included:

- The Nautch Girl, or, The Rajah of Chutneypore – 1891, a comic opera with lyrics by himself and Frank Desprez, and music by Edward Solomon at the Savoy Theatre (200 performances).
- Ma mie Rosette – 1892, a comic opera adapted from the French of Prevel and Liorat, with music by Paul Lacome and Ivan Caryll, featuring Courtice Pounds, Frank Wyatt, Jessie Bond and R. Scott Fishe.
- A Modern Don Quixote – 1893.
- The Gay Parisienne – 1894 (in Northampton); revived with music by Ivan Caryll at the Duke of York's Theatre in 1896 (369 performances); revived in New York as The Girl from Paris in 1897 (281 performances); toured internationally.
- Buttercup and Daisy – 1895, with music by Arthur Richards and others.
- Lord Tom Noddy – 1896, with music by Frank Osmond Carr at the Garrick Theatre, starring Little Tich (62 performances).
- The Lady Slavey – operetta in two acts; with lyrics by Hugh Morton and music by Gustave Adolph Kerker; Casino Theatre, New York 3 February 1896 (128 performances).
- The Gay Grisette – 1898, musical comedy with music by Carl Kiefert.
- The Ladies' Paradise – 1901, with music and lyrics by Ivan Caryll.
- A Chinese Honeymoon – musical comedy in two acts, with music by Howard Talbot; Theatre Royal, Hanley, in 1899; and at Royal Strand Theatre, London, beginning in 1901 (1,075 performances).

Dance made a fortune on A Chinese Honeymoon and its historic run. He then became one of the most successful theatrical managers in the United Kingdom, often having as many as 24 companies on tour at once. He was behind the scenes financially at many of the big West End theatres in the days preceding World War I, including the Adelphi Theatre, the Gaiety Theatre, London, Daly's Theatre and the Prince of Wales Theatre. He also directed theatre companies at the Alhambra Theatre and the Kingsway Theatre and many Stoll Theatres Corporation productions.

Dance was knighted in the 1923 Birthday Honours in recognition of his services to the theatre, which included a gift of £30,000 for the reconstruction of the Old Vic and stabilisation of that theatre as a permanent Shakespeare repertory theatre.

Dance died at home in London in 1932 at the age of 75. His estate was valued at over 150,000 pounds.
