= Procida Bucalossi and Ernest Bucalossi =

British-Italian composer and orchestral arranger

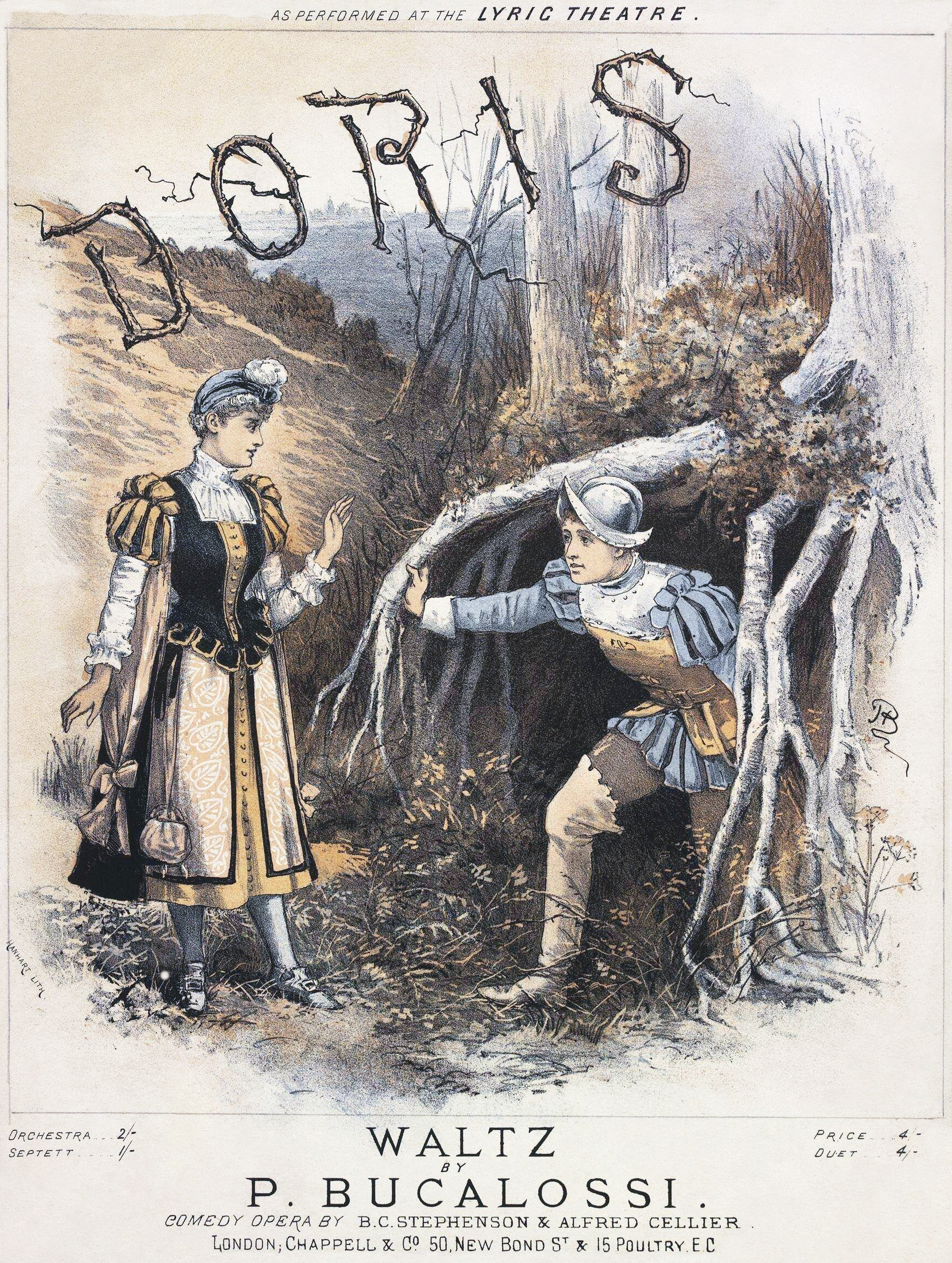
Cover of a waltz arrangement of music from the opera Doris by Procida Bucalossi

Procida Bucalossi (1832–1918) and his son Ernest Bucalossi (27 May 1863 – 15 April 1933) were British-Italian light music composers and orchestral arrangers. It is difficult to differentiate their compositions and arrangements, which are often simply credited as Bucalossi.

Procida Bucalossi is primarily known for his dance arrangements (Lancers, Polka, Quadrille, Waltz) of Savoy Operas, particularly those of Gilbert & Sullivan. As a composer, Procida had success with a comic operetta Les Manteaux Noirs (The Black Cloaks) which ran at the Avenue Theatre between June and December 1882. Other compositions attributed to Procida include "Ciribiribin", the "P&O Polka" and songs titled "The Midnight Hour" and "Love, I Will Love You Forever".

Ernest Bucalossi went to work for the D'Oyly Carte company in the early 1880s and succeeded his father as conductor at the Prince of Wales's Theatre in 1881. Until 1928, he was musical director at a variety of London theatres. Ernest is today best known for his "Grasshopper's Dance", and the rest of his compositions have slipped into obscurity. He primarily composed dances and descriptive pieces for light orchestra: the waltzes "Queen of the North", "Pastorella", "La Gitana" and "Valse-Berceuse" amongst others, the march "Pennon and Plume", a barn dance "The Careless Cuckoos", the polka "Midnight Chimes", the descriptive piece "A Hunting Scene" and incidental music to A Kiss for Cinderella.
