= Richard D'Oyly Carte =

English theatre manager and producer (1844–1901)

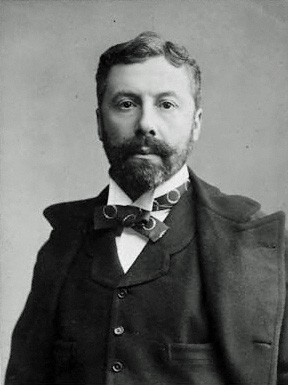
Richard D'Oyly Carte

Richard D'Oyly Carte (/dɔɪliː kɑːrt/; 3 May 1844 – 3 April 1901) was an English talent agent, theatrical impresario, composer, and hotelier during the latter half of the Victorian era. He built two of London's theatres and a hotel empire, while also establishing an opera company that ran continuously for over a hundred years and a management agency representing some of the most important artists of the day.

Carte started his career working for his father, Richard Carte, in the music publishing and musical instrument manufacturing business. As a young man he conducted and composed music, but he soon turned to promoting the entertainment careers of others through his management agency. Carte believed that a school of wholesome, well-crafted, family-friendly, English comic opera could be as popular as the risqué French works dominating the London musical stage in the 1870s. To that end he brought together the dramatist W. S. Gilbert and composer Arthur Sullivan and nurtured their collaboration on a series of thirteen Savoy operas. He founded the D'Oyly Carte Opera Company and built the state-of-the-art Savoy Theatre to host the Gilbert and Sullivan operas.

Eight years after opening the Savoy Theatre, Carte built the Savoy Hotel next to it, and later acquired other luxury hotels. In 1891 he erected the Palace Theatre, London (originally called the Royal English Opera House), which he intended to be the home of a new school of English grand opera, but this ambition was not realised beyond the production of a single work by Sullivan, Ivanhoe. Nevertheless, his partnership with Gilbert and Sullivan, and his careful management of their operas and relationship, created a series of works whose success was unprecedented in the history of musical theatre. His opera company, later run by his widow Helen and then by his son, Rupert, and granddaughter, Bridget, promoted those works for more than a century, and they are still performed regularly today.

== Early years ==
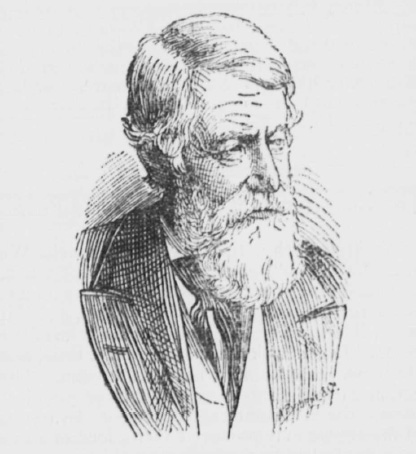
Carte's father, Richard

Carte was born at his parents' house in Greek Street, Soho, in the West End of London on 3 May 1844; he was the eldest of six children. (Note: Carte's younger siblings were Blanche (1846–1935), Viola (1848–1925), Rose (1854–1940), Henry Williams (1856–1926) and Eliza (1860–1941).) His father, Richard Carte, was a flautist, and his mother was the former Eliza Jones (1814–1885); they had eloped, to the disappointment of her father, Thomas Jones, a clergyman. Carte was of Welsh and probably Norman ancestry; D'Oyly is a Norman French name which the biographer Arthur Jacobs emphasises was in this case "a forename (not part of a double surname)". (Note: The name derived from Carte's mother's grandmother, Elizabeth D'Oyly, who came from a line of country squires in Suffolk; they are thought to have been descended from the Norman Barons D'Oyly who fought under William the Conqueror at Hastings, although this cannot be conclusively proved. A rumour circulated, beginning in the 1880s, that "Richard D'Oyly Carte" was an assumed name. There is no truth in it: his birth registration (Q2 Apr–May–Jun 1844) shows his birth name as Richard D'Oyly Carte. The misinformation was repeated in A Gilbert and Sullivan Dictionary (1936, OCLC 917800614) and has been reproduced in subsequent publications.) To supplement his income as a performer, Carte's father joined the firm of Rudall, Rose & Co., musical instrument makers and music publishers, in 1850. After he became a partner in the business, it changed its name to Rudall, Rose, Carte and Co. and later to Rudall, Carte & Co. (Note: Rudall, Carte and Co was still trading in the West End a hundred years later, and finally closed in 1958.) The family moved away from Soho when Carte was a boy. He was brought up in their large detached house in Dartmouth Park in north London. His cultured mother exposed her family to art, music and poetry, and young Carte studied the violin and then the flute at an early age. The family spoke French at home two days a week, and his parents often took their children to the theatre.

He was educated at University College School from 1856 to 1860. In January 1861, he achieved First Class level in the matriculation examination for University College London, but did not take up the place; in deference to his parents' wishes he joined his father's business, along with his brother, Henry. As the name Richard Carte was by now well known in, and beyond, the musical profession, Carte dropped the use of his own first name and styled himself "D'Oyly Carte" or, more formally, "R. D'Oyly Carte". He studied music and composed some pieces, which he dedicated to the actress Kate Terry. He also acted in amateur theatricals.

== Career ==
=== Theatrical beginnings ===
Between 1868 and 1877, Carte wrote and published the music for several of his own songs and instrumental works, (Note: Carte's Parlour songs include: "Come Back to Me", words by Carte; "Diamond Eyes", words by L. H. F. du Terraux; "A Faded Flower", words by Desprez; "The Maiden's Watch", words by Amy Thornton; "The Mountain Boy"; "Pourquoi?" Chansonette; "Questions", words by Desprez; "The Setting Sun" (with obbligato flute accompaniment); "Stars of the Summer Night", words by Henry Wadsworth Longfellow; "Three Roses", words by Adelaide Procter; "Twilight", Canzonet; "Waiting", words by Procter; "Wake, Sweet Bird" (with obbligato flute accompaniment); and "Why so pale and wan, fond lover". The Era said of the first of these, "Mr. D'Oyly Carte's music is a vast deal better than his words. The song ... musically speaking, is a creditable production." A review of "Waiting" found it "quite above the average of songs, both as to words and music. Miss Procter's pathetic stanzas are set to strikingly original music".) as well as three short comic operas: Doctor Ambrosias – His Secret (1868), (Note: Libretto adapted from Tom Noddy's Secret, a one-act farce (1800) by Thomas Haynes Bayly. First performed at St George's Hall (1868).) Marie (1871), (Note: Librettist Edward Spencer Mott. First performed at the Opera Comique, London on 26 August 1871;) and Happy Hampstead (1876). (Note: Libretto by Frank Desprez; Carte used the pen name Mark Lynne. Happy Hampstead was first performed on a provincial tour and then played at the Royalty Theatre in 1877.) On tour in 1871 he conducted Cox and Box by Arthur Sullivan and F. C. Burnand, in tandem with English adaptations of two one-act pieces by Offenbach, The Rose of Auvergne and Breaking the Spell, in which Carte's client Selina Dolaro starred. (Note: The composer's brother, Fred Sullivan, managed the tour and played Cox; Richard Temple played Bouncer, in Cox and Box.) Carte's musical talent would be helpful later in his career, as he was able to audition singers himself from the piano.

During the late 1860s and early 1870s, from within his father's firm in Charing Cross and, by late 1874, from a nearby address in Craig's Court, Carte began to build an operatic, concert and lecture management agency. His two hundred clients eventually included Charles Gounod, Jacques Offenbach, Adelina Patti, Mario, Clara Schumann, Antoinette Sterling, Edward Lloyd, Mr. and Mrs. German Reed, George Grossmith, Matthew Arnold, James McNeill Whistler and Oscar Wilde. Hesketh Pearson said of Carte: "His acute business sense was aided by a frank and agreeable manner: he could not only see where money was to be made but how to make it. He took what other people thought were risks, but he felt were certainties. ... He knew everyone worth knowing ... and his practical judgement was as sure as his sense of artistry."

=== Founding his opera company ===
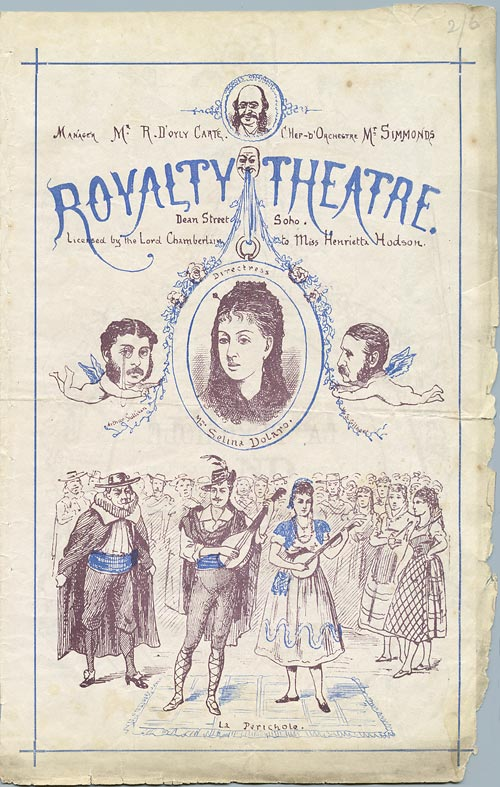
Programme for Trial by Jury, 1875

In 1874, Carte leased the Opera Comique, a theatre off the Strand, where he presented Charles Lecocq's new opéra bouffe Giroflé-Girofla, given in French by the company who had premiered the work three months earlier in Brussels. It did poor box-office business, and had to be closed after two weeks. He followed it with a modest success, The Broken Branch, an English adaptation of Gaston Serpette's La branche cassée. Carte announced his ambitions on the front of the programme for the latter: "It is my desire to establish in London a permanent abode for light Opera." The Observer commented, "Mr D'Oyly Carte is not only a skilful manager, but a trained musician, and he appears to have grasped the fact that the public are beginning to become weary of what is known as a genuine opéra bouffe, and are ready to welcome a musical entertainment of a higher order, such as a musician might produce with satisfaction".

Carte later said it was "the scheme of my life" to found a school of high-quality, family-friendly English comic opera, in contrast to the crude burlesques and adaptations of French operettas that dominated the London musical stage at that time. His experience in writing operettas had convinced him that his own creative talents were inadequate for the task. He later wrote to the dramatist W. S. Gilbert, "I envy your position but I could never attain it. If I could be an author like you I would certainly not be a manager. I am simply the tradesman who sells your works of art". Furthermore, in 1874 Carte did not yet have the resources to make his idea into reality, and after his season at the Opera Comique, he terminated his lease.

In 1875 Carte became the business manager of the Royalty Theatre, under the direction of his client, the popular singing actress Selina Dolaro who was the licensee of the theatre and star of its production of Offenbach's La Périchole. To fill out the evening (as long programmes were the fashion in Victorian theatre), he needed another piece. He remembered a libretto for a one-act comic opera that W. S. Gilbert had written and shown to him in 1873, called Trial by Jury. Meanwhile, Sullivan's popular 1867 opera, Cox and Box, had been revived at the Gaiety Theatre in 1874, and Carte had already asked him to write a piece for the Royalty. Carte knew that Gilbert had worked with Sullivan to create Thespis in 1871, and he now suggested that Sullivan could write the music for Trial by Jury. Trial by Jury, a comic treatment of an English courtroom, was an unexpected hit, outrunning La Périchole, and becoming the first step in Carte's scheme to establish a new genre of English comic opera.

Helen Carte, formerly Helen Lenoir, Carte's assistant and second wife

In June 1875 the Royalty closed for the summer, and Dolaro took her company on tour. While Trial by Jury and La Périchole were playing at the Gaiety Theatre, Dublin in September, Carte met Michael Gunn, a co-owner of the Gaiety. Gunn became a close friend of Carte's, later served as a manager in his theatrical company and was a shareholder and director in his hotel business. Even after the initial production of Trial by Jury Carte continued to produce continental operetta, touring in the summer of 1876 with a repertoire consisting of English adaptations of French opéra bouffe (Offenbach's La Périchole, and La Grande-Duchesse de Gérolstein, Lecocq's La fille de Madame Angot and Léon Vasseur's La Timbale d'argent), paired with two one-act English after-pieces (Happy Hampstead and Trial by Jury). Carte was the musical director of this travelling company.

In February 1877 Carte, organising a company for a provincial tour of a successful London farce, auditioned a novice actress called Helen Lenoir. He engaged her for a small role, but after a few weeks she left the tour and returned to London where she secured an office post in Carte's agency. She gradually assumed a key role in his business affairs and his personal life. Frank Desprez, the editor of The Era, wrote: "Her character exactly compensated for the deficiencies in his."

Encouraged by the success of Trial by Jury, Carte had been attempting since 1875 to raise money for either a revival of Thespis or a new piece. In 1877 he finally found four backers and formed the "Comedy Opera Company" to produce new works by Gilbert and Sullivan, along with those of other British authors and composers. This allowed Carte to lease the Opera Comique and to give Gilbert and Sullivan firm terms for a new opera. The first comic opera produced by the new company was Gilbert and Sullivan's The Sorcerer in 1877, with a plot involving a tradesmanlike London magician and his patented love potion. Gilbert, Sullivan and Carte were able to select their own cast, instead of using the players under contract to the theatre where the work was produced, as had been the case with their earlier works. They chose talented actors, few of whom were well-known stars; Carte's agency provided many of them. The reception of the piece showed that Carte had been right that there was a promising future in family-friendly English comic opera.

The Sorcerer was followed by H.M.S. Pinafore in 1878. It opened to great enthusiasm but within days of the premiere London experienced an unusually strong and protracted heat wave, and business in the ill-ventilated Opera Comique was badly affected. Takings dropped to £40 a night, and Carte's directors in the Comedy Opera Company advocated cutting their losses and closing the show. After promotional efforts by Carte and Sullivan, who programmed some of the Pinafore music when he conducted a season of promenade concerts at Covent Garden, the opera became a hit. Carte convinced Gilbert and Sullivan that when their original agreement with the Comedy Opera Company expired in July 1879, a business partnership among the three of them would be to their advantage. Each put up £1,000 and formed a new partnership under the name "Mr Richard D'Oyly Carte's Opera Company". Under the partnership agreement, once the expenses of mounting the productions had been deducted, each of the three partners was entitled to one third of the profits.

On 31 July 1879, the last day of their agreement with Carte, the directors of the Comedy Opera Company attempted to repossess the Pinafore set by force during a performance, causing a celebrated fracas. Carte's stagehands managed to ward off their backstage attackers and protect the scenery and props. The Comedy Opera Company opened a rival production of H.M.S. Pinafore in London, but it was not as popular as the D'Oyly Carte production and soon closed. Legal action over the ownership of the rights ended in victory for Carte, Gilbert and Sullivan. From 1 August 1879, the new company, later called the D'Oyly Carte Opera Company, became the sole authorised producer of the works of Gilbert and Sullivan.

=== Early opera successes; property interests ===
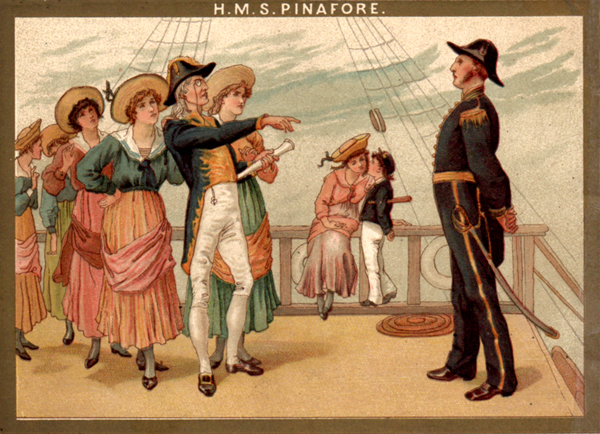
Scene from H.M.S. Pinafore

H.M.S. Pinafore was so successful that Carte soon sent two companies out to tour the provinces. (Note: The company playing at the cities and larger towns was headed by W. S. Penley; that playing the smaller towns was headed by Richard Mansfield.) The opera ran for 571 performances in London, the second-longest run in musical theatre history up to that time. (Note: The longest-running piece of musical theatre was the operetta Les Cloches de Corneville, which held that distinction until the record-breaking run of Dorothy in 1886.) Over 150 unauthorised productions sprang up in America alone, but because American law then offered no copyright protection to foreigners, Carte, Gilbert and Sullivan were not able to demand royalties from, or to control the artistic content of, these productions. Sullivan commented that in the US there was a belief "that a free and independent American citizen ought not to be robbed of his right of robbing someone else".

To try to counter this copyright piracy and make some money from the popularity of their opera in America, Carte travelled to New York with the authors and the company to present an "authentic" production of Pinafore, beginning in December 1879, as well as American tours. Lenoir made fifteen visits to America in the 1880s and 1890s to promote Carte's interests, superintending arrangements for American productions and tours of each of the new Gilbert and Sullivan operas. Beginning with Pinafore, Carte licensed the J. C. Williamson company to produce the works in Australia and New Zealand.

In an effort to head off unauthorised American productions of their next opera, The Pirates of Penzance, Carte and his partners opened it in New York on 31 December 1879, prior to its 1880 London premiere. They hoped to forestall further "piracy" by establishing the authorised production and tours in America before others could copy it and by delaying publication of the score and libretto. They succeeded in keeping for themselves the direct profits of the venture, but they tried without success for many years to control the American performance copyrights over their operas. The Pirates was an immediate hit in New York, and later London, becoming one of the most popular Gilbert and Sullivan operas. To secure the British copyright, Lenoir arranged an ad hoc performance at the Royal Bijou Theatre, Paignton, Devon, by the smaller of Carte's two Pinafore touring companies, the afternoon before the New York premiere.

Savoy Theatre, 1881

The next Gilbert and Sullivan opera, Patience, opened at the Opera Comique in April 1881 and was another big success, usurping Pinafore's position as the longest running piece in the series with the second-longest run in musical theatre history to that date. Patience satirised the self-indulgent aesthetic movement of the 1870s and '80s in England. To popularise the opera in America, in 1882 Carte sent one of the artistes under his management, the young poet Oscar Wilde, on a lecture tour to explain to Americans what the aesthetic movement was about. Carte told an interviewer at that time that he had fifteen theatrical companies and performers touring simultaneously in Europe, America and Australia.

Carte had been planning for several years to build a new theatre to promote English comic opera and, in particular, the Gilbert and Sullivan operas. With profits from the Gilbert and Sullivan operas and his concert and lecture agency, he bought property along the Strand in 1880 with frontage onto the Thames Embankment, where he built the Savoy Theatre in 1881. (Note: Carte chose the name in honour of the Savoy Palace, which had been built on the site in the thirteenth century by Peter, Count of Savoy. It later passed to John of Gaunt but was destroyed in the Peasants' Revolt in 1381.) It was a state-of-the-art facility, setting a new standard for technology, comfort and decor. It was the first public building in the world to be lit entirely by electric lights and seated nearly 1,300 people (compared to the Opera Comique's 862).

Patience was the first production at the new theatre, transferring there on 10 October 1881. The first generator proved too small to power the whole building, and though the entire front of house was electrically lit, the stage was lit by gas until 28 December 1881. At that performance, Carte stepped on stage and broke a glowing lightbulb before the audience to demonstrate the safety of the new technology. The Times concluded that the theatre "is admirably adapted for its purpose, its acoustic qualities are excellent, and all reasonable demands of comfort and taste are complied with." Carte and his manager, George Edwardes (later famous as manager of the Gaiety Theatre), introduced several innovations at the theatre including free programme booklets, the orderly "queue" system with numbered tickets for the pit and gallery (an American idea), tea served at the interval and a policy of no tipping for cloakroom or other services. Daily expenses at the theatre were about half the possible takings from ticket sales. The last eight of Gilbert and Sullivan's comic operas were premiered at the Savoy, and all their operas came to be known as Savoy operas.

Savoy Hotel viewed from the Thames, 1890s

The Savoy Hotel, designed by the architect Thomas Edward Collcutt, opened in 1889. Financed by profits from The Mikado, it was the first hotel lit by electric lights and the first with electric lifts. In the 1890s, under its famous manager, César Ritz, and chef Auguste Escoffier, it became a well-known luxury hotel and would generate more income and contribute more to the D'Oyly Carte fortunes than any other enterprise, including the opera companies. Carte later acquired and refurbished Claridge's (1893), The Grand Hotel in Rome (1896), Simpson's-in-the-Strand (1898) and The Berkeley (1900).

=== Peak years for the opera company ===
During the years when the Gilbert and Sullivan operas were being written Carte also produced operas and plays by other writing teams, as well as other works to fill the Savoy Theatre in between new operas. Many of these were companion pieces to the Gilbert and Sullivan operas. Others were new full-length pieces either for the Savoy or for Carte's touring companies, which played the Gilbert and Sullivan operas and the new works extensively. Carte and Lenoir also continued to run his management agency. As an example of their level of activity, an 1881 souvenir programme commemorating the 250th performance of Patience in London and its 100th performance in New York records that, in addition to these two productions of Patience, Carte was simultaneously managing many other projects. These included two companies touring with Patience, two touring with other Gilbert and Sullivan operas, one touring with the operetta Olivette (co-produced with Charles Wyndham), one with Claude Duval in America, a production of Youth running at a New York theatre, a lecture tour by Archibald Forbes (a war correspondent) and productions of Patience, Pirates, Claude Duval and Billee Taylor in association with J. C. Williamson in Australia, among other things.

Iolanthe, Carte's first new production at the Savoy, 1882

Carte also introduced the practice of licensing amateur theatrical societies to present works for which he held the rights, increasing the works' popularity and the sales of scores and libretti, as well as the rental of band parts. This had an important influence on amateur theatre in general. Cellier and Bridgeman wrote in 1914 that, prior to the creation of the Savoy operas, amateur actors were treated with contempt by professionals. After the formation of amateur Gilbert and Sullivan companies licensed to perform the operas, professionals recognised that the amateur societies "support the culture of music and the drama. They are now accepted as useful training schools for the legitimate stage, and from the volunteer ranks have sprung many present-day favourites." Cellier and Bridgeman attributed the rise in quality and reputation of the amateur groups largely to "the popularity of, and infectious craze for performing, the Gilbert and Sullivan operas". The National Operatic and Dramatic Association was founded in 1899. It reported, in 1914, that nearly 200 British societies were producing Gilbert and Sullivan operas that year.

After Patience, Carte produced Iolanthe, which opened in 1882. During its run, in February 1883, he signed a five-year partnership agreement with Gilbert and Sullivan, obliging them to create new operas for him upon six months' notice. Sullivan had not intended to immediately write a new work with Gilbert, but he suffered a serious financial loss when his stockbroker went bankrupt in November 1882 and felt the long-term contract necessary for his security. The Gilbert scholar Andrew Crowther comments, "Effectively, [the contract] made [Gilbert and Sullivan] Carte's employees – a situation which created its own resentments." The partnership's next opera, Princess Ida, opened in January 1884. Carte soon saw that it was running weakly at the box office and invoked the agreement to call upon his partners to write a new opera. The musical establishment was continually exhorting Sullivan to abandon comic opera in favour of serious music, (Note: For example, The Times, 27 May 1878, p. 6, favourably reviewing H.M.S. Pinafore, nevertheless added, "we cannot suppress a word of regret that the composer on whom before all others the chances of a national school of music depend should confine himself ... to a class of production which, however attractive, is hardly worthy of the efforts of an accomplished and serious artist.") and after he was knighted in 1883, the pressure increased. He soon regretted signing the five-year contract. In March 1884, Sullivan told Carte that "it is impossible for me to do another piece of the character of those already written by Gilbert and myself."

During this conflict and others during the 1880s, Carte and Helen Lenoir frequently worked to smooth over the partners' differences using a mixture of friendship and business acumen. Sullivan asked to be released from the partnership on several occasions. Nevertheless, Carte was able to coax eight comic operas out of his partners between 1879 and 1896. When Princess Ida closed after a comparatively short run of nine months, for the first time in the partnership's history, a new opera was not ready. Gilbert first suggested a plot in which people fell in love against their wills after taking a magic lozenge – a scenario that Sullivan had previously rejected. Gilbert eventually came up with a new idea and began work in May 1884.

Programme cover for original production of The Mikado, 1885

Carte produced the first revival of The Sorcerer, together with Trial by Jury, and matinees of The Pirates of Penzance played by a cast of children, while he waited for his partners to finish writing the new work. This became the partnership's most successful opera, The Mikado, which opened in March 1885. The piece satirised British institutions by setting them in a fictional Japan and took advantage of the Victorian craze for the exotic and "picturesque" Far East. The Mikado became the partnership's longest-running hit, lasting for 672 performances at the Savoy Theatre, and supplanting Patience as the second-longest-running work of musical theatre up to that time. It was extraordinarily popular in the US and worldwide and remains the most frequently performed Savoy Opera. The partnership's next opera was Ruddigore, which opened in January 1887. The piece, though a financial success, was a relative disappointment after the extraordinary run of The Mikado. When Ruddigore closed after 288 performances over nine months, Carte mounted revivals of earlier Gilbert and Sullivan operas at the Savoy for almost a year. After another attempt by Gilbert to persuade Sullivan to set a "lozenge plot", Gilbert met his collaborator half way by writing a serio-comic plot for The Yeomen of the Guard, which premiered in October 1888. The opera ran for over a year, with strong New York and touring productions. This was a happy time for Carte, with a long-running opera, new marriage and new hotel and opera house under construction. When Carte asked his partners for a new work, Sullivan again expressed reluctance to write another comic opera, asking if Gilbert would write a "dramatic work on a larger musical scale". Gilbert declined but offered a compromise that Sullivan ultimately accepted: the two would write a light opera for the Savoy, and at the same time, Sullivan could work on a grand opera that Carte would produce at a new theatre he was planning to build to present British grand opera. The new comic opera was The Gondoliers, which opened in December 1889 and became one of the partnership's greatest successes, with an initial run of 554 performances.

During these years, Carte was not just the manager of the theatre. He was a full participant in the producing partnership with Gilbert and Sullivan, involved in casting and finding designers; in charge of publicity; directing and hiring designers for the non-Gilbert works, including the many companion pieces (sometimes with the help of assistants); and casting, directing and rehearsing the touring companies, among other duties. According to Henry Lytton, "Mr. Carte was a great stage manager. He could take in the details of a scene with one sweep of his eagle eye and say unerringly just what was wrong." The quality of Carte's productions created a national and international taste for them, and he sent touring companies throughout the British provinces, to America (generally managed by Helen), Europe and elsewhere. Queen Victoria honoured the company by calling for a Royal Command Performance of The Gondoliers at Windsor Castle in 1891. (Note: Following the libretto closely, the queen noticed additions to the text made by some of the actors and asked Carte to explain why this was done. Carte replied that they "are what we call 'gags'". The queen answered that she had always understood that "gags were things that were put by authority into people's mouths." Carte rejoined, "These gags, Your Majesty, are things people put into their own mouths without authority.") Bernard Shaw, writing in The World in October 1893, said:

Those who are old enough to compare the Savoy performances with those of the dark ages, taking into account the pictorial treatment of the fabrics and colors on the stage, the cultivation and intelligence of the choristers, the quality of the orchestra, and the degree of artistic good breeding, so to speak, expected from the principals, best know how great an advance has been made by Mr. D'Oyly Carte.

=== Later years ===
Carte's Royal English Opera House, 1891, during the run of Ivanhoe

On 22 April 1890, during the run of The Gondoliers, Gilbert discovered that maintenance expenses for the theatre, including a new £500 carpet for the front lobby of the theatre, were being charged to the partnership instead of borne by Carte. Gilbert angrily confronted Carte, but Carte refused to reconsider the accounts. Even though the amount of the charge was not great, Gilbert felt that it was a moral issue involving Carte's integrity, and he could not look past it. Gilbert stormed out and wrote to Sullivan that "I left him with the remark that it was a mistake to kick down the ladder by which he had risen". Helen Carte wrote that Gilbert had addressed Carte "in a way that I should not have thought you would have used to an offending menial." Matters deteriorated further, and Gilbert brought a lawsuit. Sullivan sided with Carte, who was building the Royal English Opera House, the inaugural production of which was to be Sullivan's forthcoming grand opera. Gilbert won the dispute and felt vindicated, but his actions had been hurtful to his partners, and the partnership disbanded.

Carte's first production at the Royal English Opera House was of Sullivan's only grand opera, Ivanhoe, which opened in January 1891. It played for an initial run of 155 performances, a record for an opera. When it finally closed in July, Carte had no new work ready to play at the opera house, and so it had to close. The opera house re-opened in November 1891 with André Messager's La Basoche at first alternating in repertory with Ivanhoe, and then La Basoche played alone, closing in January 1892. Carte again had no new opera to present at the house, and the venture soon failed. Sir Henry Wood, who as young man had been répétiteur for the production, recalled in his autobiography, "If D'Oyly Carte had had a repertory of six operas instead of only one, I believe he would have established English opera in London for all time. Towards the end of the run of Ivanhoe I was already preparing The Flying Dutchman with Eugène Oudin in the name part. He would have been superb. However, plans were altered and the Dutchman was shelved." Carte leased the theatre to Sarah Bernhardt for a season and finally abandoned the project. He sold the opera house at a loss to the impresario Sir Augustus Harris. It was then converted into a music hall, the Palace Theatre of Varieties, and later became the Palace Theatre.

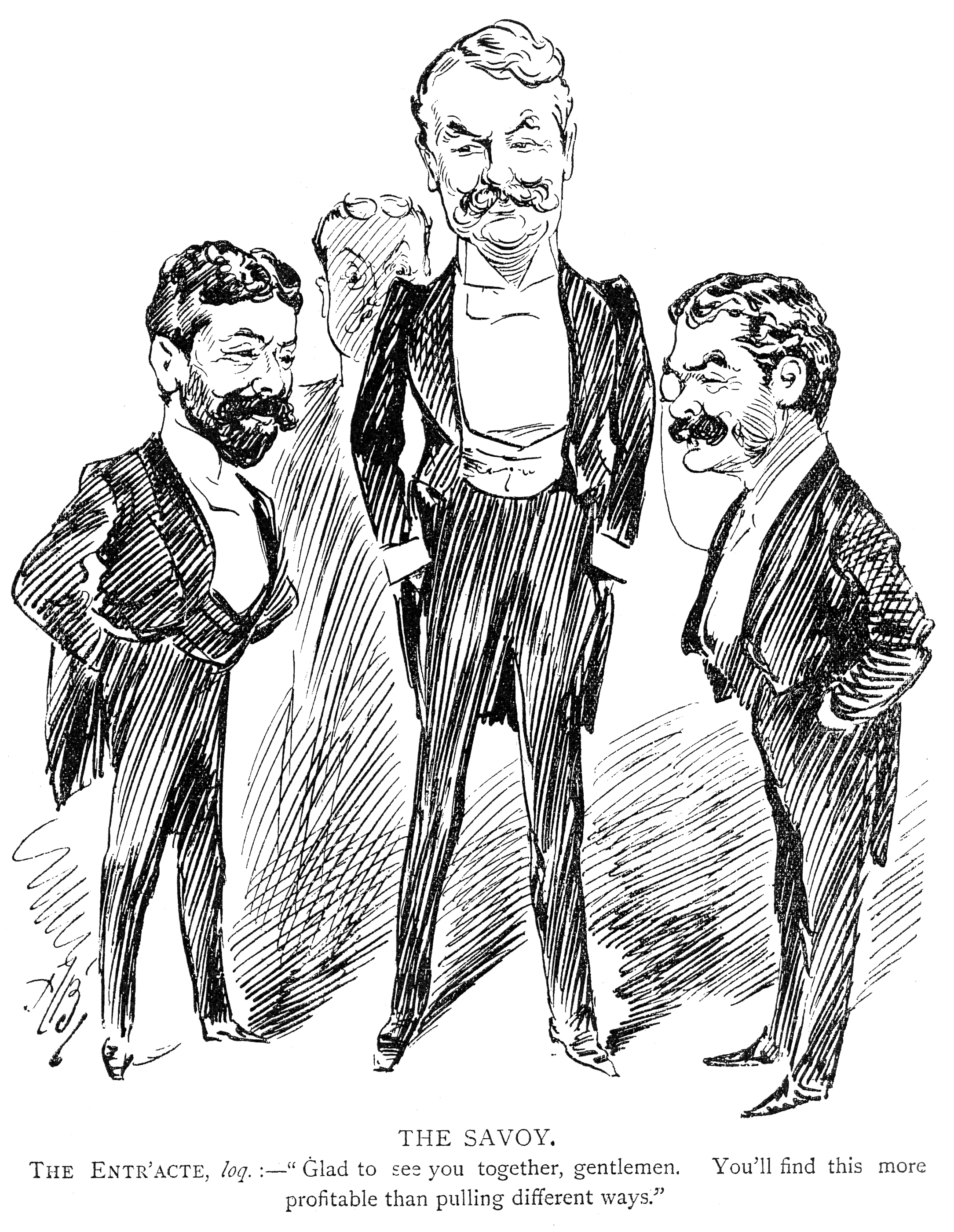
The Entr'acte expresses its pleasure that Gilbert and Sullivan are reunited.

Because of the carpet quarrel, Gilbert had vowed to write no more for the Savoy. When The Gondoliers closed in 1891, Carte needed new authors and composers to write works for the Savoy Theatre. He turned to old friends George Dance, Frank Desprez and Edward Solomon for his next piece, The Nautch Girl, which ran for a satisfying 200 performances in 1891–92. Carte then revived Solomon and Sydney Grundy's The Vicar of Bray, which ran through the summer of 1892. Next came Grundy and Sullivan's Haddon Hall, which held the stage until April 1893. While Carte presented new pieces and revivals at the Savoy, his touring companies continued to play throughout Britain and in America. In 1894, for example, Carte had four companies touring Britain and one playing in America.

Gilbert's aggressive, though successful, legal action had embittered Carte and Sullivan, but the partnership had been so profitable that Carte and his wife eventually sought to reunite the author and composer. After several attempts by the Cartes, the reconciliation finally came through the efforts of Tom Chappell, who published the sheet music to their operas. In 1893, Gilbert and Sullivan produced their penultimate collaboration, Utopia, Limited. While that was being prepared, Carte staged Jane Annie, by J. M. Barrie and Arthur Conan Doyle, with music by Ernest Ford. Despite the popularity of Barrie and Conan Doyle, the show was a flop, closing after only 51 performances.

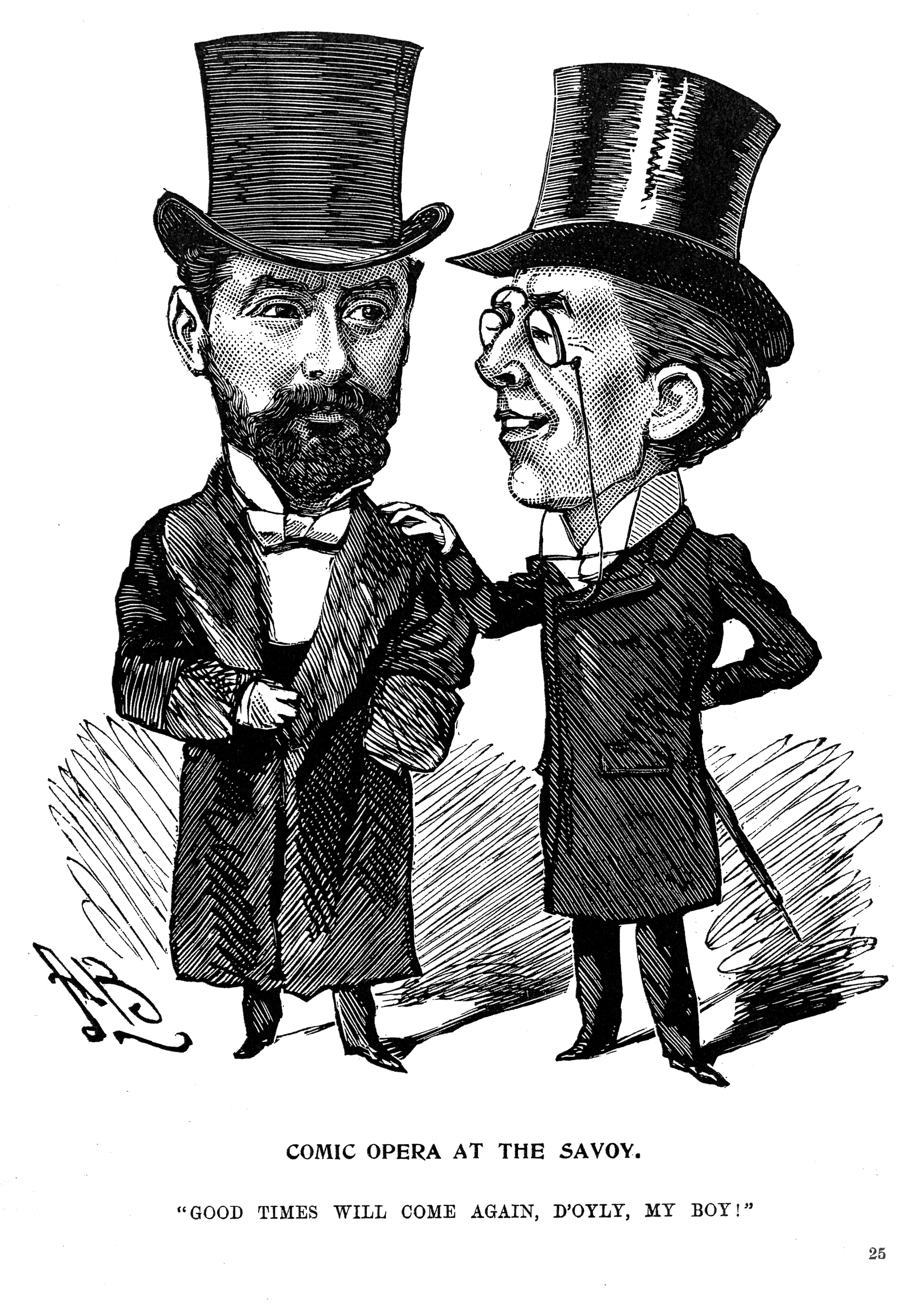
George Grossmith comforts Carte after failure of The Grand Duke

Utopia was Carte's most expensive production to date, but it ran for a comparatively disappointing 245 performances, until June 1894. Carte then played first Mirette, by Messager, then The Chieftain, by F. C. Burnand and Sullivan. These ran for 102 and 97 performances, respectively. The company then toured the London suburbs, and the Savoy was leased to other managements until November, when Carte presented a revival of The Mikado. This was followed in 1896 by The Grand Duke, which ran for 123 performances and was Gilbert and Sullivan's only financial failure. The Gondoliers turned out to be Gilbert and Sullivan's last big hit, and after The Grand Duke, the two men never collaborated again. At the Savoy, Carte produced His Majesty (1897), The Grand Duchess of Gerolstein (1897), The Beauty Stone (1898) and The Lucky Star (1899), as well as revivals of the Gilbert and Sullivan operas.

Though the 1890s brought Carte more disappointments than hits in the theatre, his hotel business prospered and grew. He acquired Simpson's-in-the-Strand and Claridge's Hotel, both of which he entirely rebuilt. There was one grave setback, in 1897, when he had to dismiss his manager, Ritz, and his star chef, Escoffier, for financial misconduct. Carte's choice as successor to Ritz was George Reeves-Smith, manager and part-owner of the Berkeley Hotel. To secure his services, Carte bought the Berkeley in 1900 and promoted Reeves-Smith to be managing director of the whole Savoy Group. Carte had used the same method, a year earlier, to secure a new maître d'hôtel. He was determined to engage M. Joseph, proprietor of the Marivaux Restaurant in Paris, then at the height of its fame. Carte was seriously ill, but he insisted on being carried to the boat-train. In Paris he bought the Marivaux and returned with Joseph to the Savoy.

Throughout the later 1890s, Carte's health was in decline, and Helen assumed more and more of the responsibilities for the opera company. She profitably managed the theatre and the provincial touring companies. In 1894, Carte had hired his son, Rupert, as an assistant. While Carte was ill, in 1897, Rupert assisted Mrs Carte and Gilbert with the first revival of The Yeomen of the Guard at the Savoy. The Savoy put on a number of shows for comparatively short runs during this period, including Sullivan's The Beauty Stone, which ran for only 50 performances, in 1898. In 1899, Carte finally had a new success with Sullivan and Basil Hood's The Rose of Persia, which ran for 213 performances. Neither Carte nor Sullivan lived to see the production of the next piece by Hood, The Emerald Isle, for which Edward German completed Sullivan's unfinished score.

== Personal life ==
Carte's family: clockwise from top left, Blanche, Helen, Lucas, and Rupert

Carte was married twice. His first wife was Blanche Julia Prowse (1853–1885), the daughter of William Prowse, a piano manufacturer, music publisher and booking agent. As a teenager, she had participated in amateur theatricals with Carte. They married in 1870 and had two sons, Lucas (1872–1907) and Rupert. Blanche died of pneumonia in 1885, and in 1888, Carte married his assistant, Helen Lenoir. Their wedding took place in the Savoy Chapel, with Arthur Sullivan as the best man. Rupert received training in an accounting firm and then became his father's assistant in 1894. Lucas, who was not involved in the family businesses, became a barrister. He was appointed private secretary to Lord Chief Justice Charles Russell in 1899 in connection with the Venezuelan boundary arbitration in Paris. He contracted tuberculosis of which he died at the age of 34. (Note: Lucas was born on 27 December 1872 and was educated at Winchester College and Magdalen College, Oxford. He was called to the bar in 1897. He was appointed private secretary to Lord Chief Justice Charles Russell in 1899. After he contracted tuberculosis, he worked for the rest of his life on issues relating to the disease and died on 18 January 1907.)

Carte's London house was at the Adelphi, not far from the Savoy. Passionate about the visual arts as well as the performing arts, Carte invited his friend, the artist James McNeill Whistler, to decorate the house. Whistler had the entire billiard room painted the colour of the billiard cloth, and elsewhere painted his favourite yellow with his own hand. Equally enthusiastic for technological innovation, Carte installed a lift, the first in a private house in England. Around 1890, he bought a small island in the River Thames, between Weybridge and Shepperton, called Folly Eyot, which he renamed D'Oyly Carte Island. He wanted to use the island as an annex to his new Savoy Hotel, but the local authorities refused to grant him a drinks licence for the property. Instead, he built Eyot House, a large house and garden on the island, that he used as a residence and where he entertained guests. In later years, Carte displayed his macabre sense of humour by keeping a crocodile on the island. (Note: Baily speculates that Carte's sense of humour was a bond with Gilbert just as his "cultured musical mind" was a bond with Sullivan.)

== Death and legacy ==
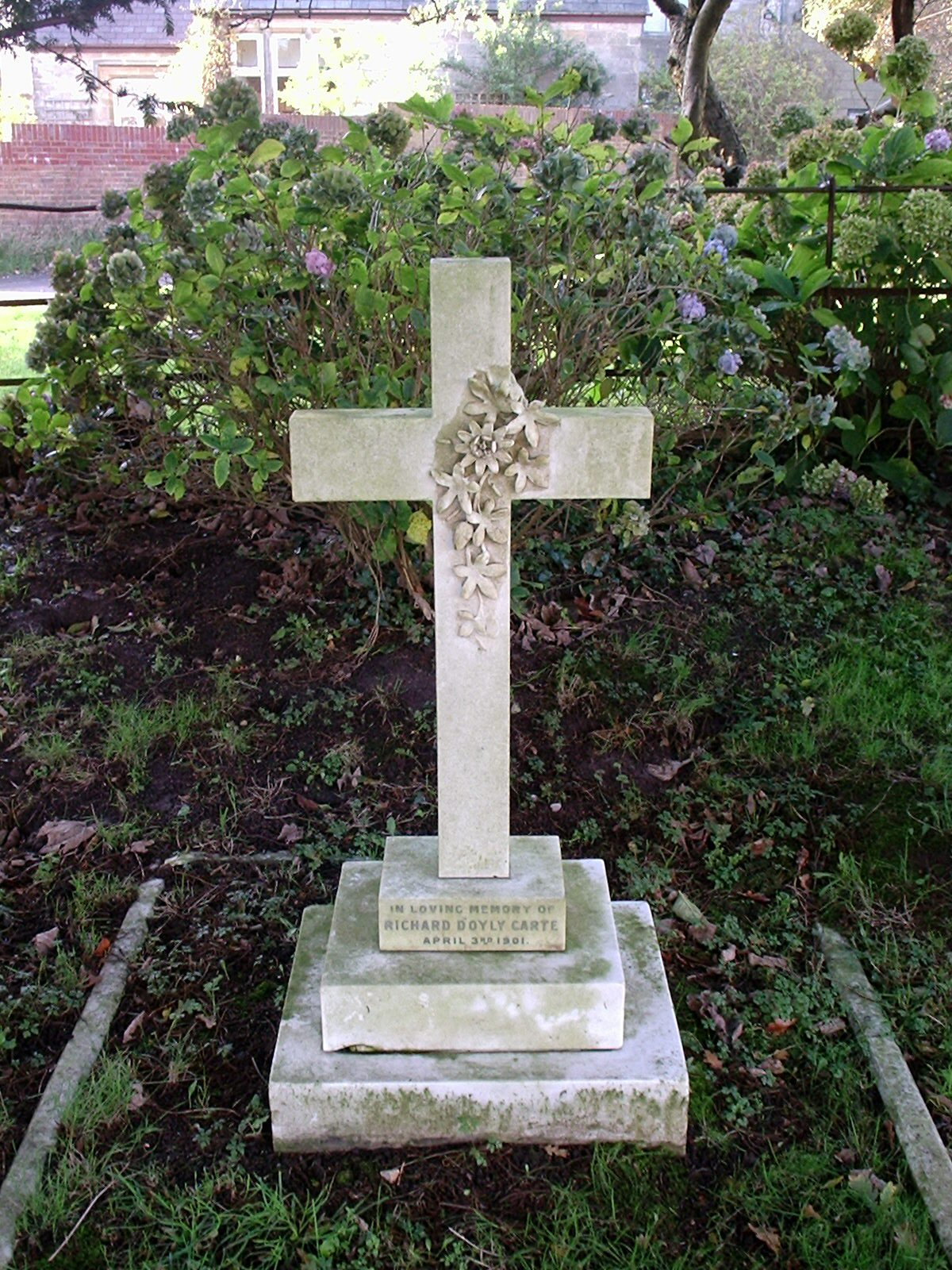
Carte's grave at St Andrews church, Fairlight

Carte died at his London home from dropsy and heart disease in 1901, just short of his 57th birthday. He is buried in the churchyard of St Andrew's in Fairlight, East Sussex, near his parents' graves. A memorial service was held at the Chapel Royal of the Savoy, where a memorial stained glass window was later dedicated to him. He left an estate valued at £250,000.

Carte was instrumental in bringing the British theatre from its low status in the mid-Victorian age to a position of respectable eminence, with knighthoods for actors, such as Henry Irving, and for dramatists, including Gilbert. (Note: Baily quotes Gilbert's description of mid-19th century productions as "crude, unintelligent, and sometimes frankly improper") Bernard Shaw wrote of Carte's theatrical legacy, "Mr D'Oyly Carte founded a new school of English comic opera; raised operatic inscenation to the rank of a fine art; and finally built a new English Opera House and made a magnificent effort to do for English grand opera what he had done for comic opera." In Carte's obituary, The Times noted, "By his refined taste he raised the reputation of the mise en scène of the Savoy operas to a very high pitch. He set a high standard". Beyond this, however, Carte's influence, through the production of the Savoy operas, heavily influenced the course of the development of modern musical theatre.

Carte was also a prime mover in making hotels respectable and respected: in the words of the Oxford Dictionary of National Biography: "Led by the prince of Wales [the Savoy] became the meeting place for London high society and the nouveaux riches of the British empire.... [The] food and the ambience lured people from the clubs to dine in public and give great parties there. It allowed ladies, hitherto fearful of dining in public, to be seen in full regalia in the Savoy dining and supper rooms."

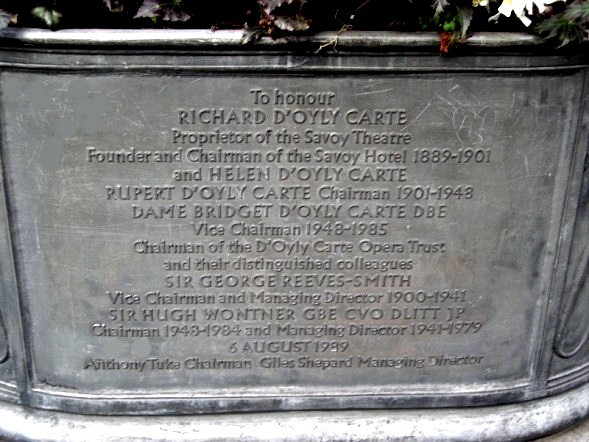
Planter in the Embankment Gardens behind the Savoy Hotel

Carte left the theatre, opera company, hotels and his other business interests to Helen. Her London and touring companies continued to present the Savoy Operas in Britain and overseas. In 1901 she leased the Savoy Theatre to William Greet, overseeing his management of a revival of Iolanthe and several new comic operas. Rupert became chairman of the Savoy Hotel by 1903, which Helen continued to own. In late 1906, Helen staged a Gilbert and Sullivan repertory season at the Savoy Theatre. The season, and the following one, which were both directed by Gilbert, earned excellent reviews and sold well, revitalising the company. After the second repertory season concluded in 1909 the company did not perform in London again until 1919, only touring throughout Britain during that time.

At her death in 1913, Helen passed the family businesses to Carte's son, Rupert. He maintained the hotel business, disposing of the Grand Hotel in Rome, but expanding the group in London. The Savoy Group remained under the control of the Carte family and its associates until 1994. Carte's hotels have remained among the most prestigious in London, with the London Evening Standard calling the Savoy "London's most famous hotel" in 2009.

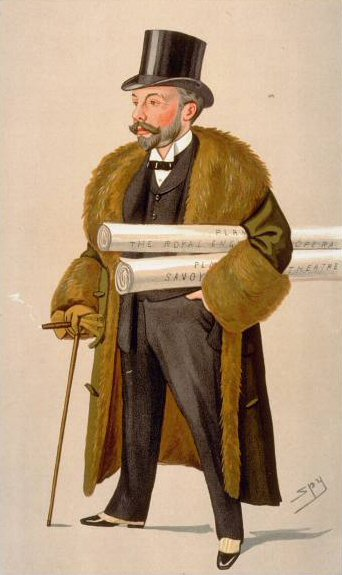
"Spy" cartoon in Vanity Fair

Rupert D'Oyly Carte refreshed the opera company's productions and added London seasons, beginning in 1919, as well as provincial and foreign tours. In 1948 Rupert died, leaving a strong company to his daughter Bridget D'Oyly Carte. However, the rising costs of mounting professional light opera without any government support eventually became too much for the company. Bridget was forced to close the company in 1982. Nevertheless, the Gilbert and Sullivan operas continue to be produced frequently today throughout the English-speaking world and beyond, and Carte's vision of wholesome light operas that celebrate Great Britain endures.

== Notes, references and sources ==
=== Sources ===
- Ainger, Michael (2002). Gilbert and Sullivan – A Dual Biography. Oxford: Oxford University Press. ISBN 978-0-19-514769-8.
- Baily, Leslie (1966) [1956]. The Gilbert and Sullivan Book (second ed.). London: Spring Books. OCLC 3651931.
- Baldwin, Peter (2014). The Copyright Wars : Three Centuries of Trans-Atlantic Battle. Princeton: Princeton University Press. ISBN 978-1-4008-5191-1.
- Bargainnier, Earl F. (1989). "W. S. Gilbert and American Musical Theatre". American Popular Music: Readings from the Popular Press. Timothy E. Scheurer (ed). Bowling Green, Ohio: Bowling Green State University Press. ISBN 978-0-87972-466-5.
- Barrington, Rutland (1908). Rutland Barrington by Himself. London: Grant Richards. OCLC 7745426.
- Bettany, Clemence (1975). D'Oyly Carte Centenary. London: D'Oyly Carte Opera Company. OCLC 910206945.
- Bigio, Robert (2010). Rudall, Rose, Carte & Co: The Art of the Flute in Britain. London: Tony Bingham. ISBN 978-0-946113-09-5.
- Bradley, Ian (1996). The Complete Annotated Gilbert and Sullivan. Oxford: Oxford University Press. ISBN 978-0-19-816503-3.
- Cellier, François; Cunningham Bridgeman (1914). Gilbert and Sullivan and Their Operas. Boston: Little Brown. OCLC 1020412682.
- Dark, Sidney; Grey, Rowland (1923). W. S. Gilbert: His Life and Letters. Ayer Publishing. ISBN 978-0-405-08430-0.
- Gaye, Freda, ed. (1967). Who's Who in the Theatre (fourteenth ed.). London: Sir Isaac Pitman and Sons. OCLC 5997224.
- Goodman, Andrew (1988). Gilbert and Sullivan's London. London: Spellmount Ltd. ISBN 978-0-946771-31-8.
- Jacobs, Arthur (1986). Arthur Sullivan – A Victorian Musician. Oxford University Press. ISBN 978-0-19-282033-4.
- Jones, J. Bush (2003). Our Musicals, Ourselves. Lebanon, New Hampshire: Brandeis University Press. ISBN 978-1-58465-311-0.
- Joseph, Tony (1994). D'Oyly Carte Opera Company, 1875–1982: An Unofficial History. London: Bunthorne Books. ISBN 978-0-9507992-1-6.
- Laurence, Dan H., ed. (1989). Shaw's Music – The Complete Musical Criticism of Bernard Shaw. Max Reinhardt, Volume II. ISBN 978-0-370-30249-2.
- Lytton, Henry (1922). Secrets of a Savoyard. London: Jarrold. OCLC 1069586939.
- Pearson, Hesketh (1957). Gilbert: His Life and Strife. Methuen. OCLC 912035807.
- Rollins, Cyril; R. John Witts (1962). The D'Oyly Carte Opera Company in Gilbert and Sullivan Operas: A Record of Productions, 1875–1961. London: Michael Joseph. OCLC 504581419.
- Seeley, Paul (2019). Richard D'Oyly Carte. London: Routledge. ISBN 978-1-351-04589-6.
- Stedman, Jane W. (1996). W. S. Gilbert, A Classic Victorian & His Theatre. Oxford University Press. ISBN 978-0-370-30249-2.
- Traubner, Richard (2003). Operetta: A Theatrical History. London: Routledge. ISBN 978-0-415-96641-2.
- Winn, Christopher (2010). I Never Knew That about the River Thames. London: Ebury Press. ISBN 978-0-091-93357-9.
- Young, Percy (1971). Sir Arthur Sullivan. London: Dent. ISBN 978-0-460-03934-5.
