= Eaton Faning =

English composer and teacher

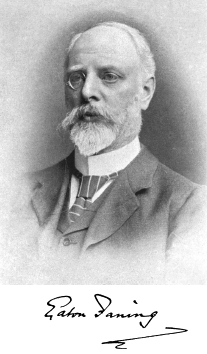
Faning in 1901

Joseph Eaton Faning (20 May 1850 – 28 October 1927), known as Eaton Faning, was an English composer and teacher. The son of a music teacher, he became the organist of a church at the age of twelve. He attended the Royal Academy of Music, where his teachers included Arthur Sullivan. He was an outstanding student, winning many awards. He joined the staff of the Academy in 1874 and later taught at the Guildhall School of Music, the Royal College of Music and Harrow School.

As a composer, Faning's works ranged from operettas, including a one-act Savoy Opera, to church music, including a Mass and a Magnificat. He also composed orchestral music including a symphony, and was best known for his songs, of which the most popular was the part-song The Vikings.

== Biography ==
=== Early years ===
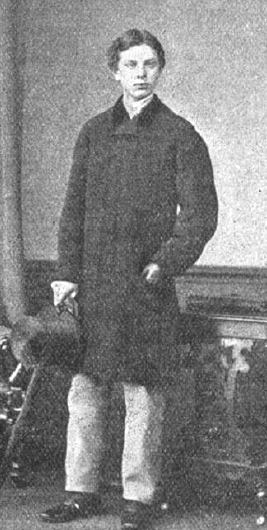
Faning aged 16

Faning was born in Helston, Cornwall, where his father, Roger Faning, was a music teacher. Faning received his first instruction in music (piano and violin) from his parents. At the age of five he made his first public appearance at a local function, when he played a violin solo on a tiny fiddle. When he was nine years old, his father died, and the family moved to Ipswich, Suffolk. Faning sang alto in the choir of a local church and studied the organ and the violin with local teachers. At the age of twelve, he became organist of All Saints' Church Holbrook, a village seven miles from Ipswich, where he had to walk when the carrier's cart was not available. He subsequently studied under Lindley Nunn, organist of St. Mary-le-Tower, Ipswich, who appointed Faning his deputy. This post was of the greatest practical value to the young musician. He played at the daily evening service for five years, and was deputy trainer of the choir, which consisted of sixty voices.

In April 1870, just before his twentieth birthday, Faning entered the Royal Academy of Music as a student. He studied composition under Sterndale Bennett (then Principal) and Arthur Sullivan, and, with other professors, singing, piano, cello and organ. He later recalled how much he learnt from Bennett about form, and from Sullivan about orchestration. His first appearance at an Academy concert was as a pianist, when he played Beethoven's Moonlight Sonata in October 1870. In 1871 he was awarded the Academy's bronze medal, and the silver medal the following year. As a student, he sang in the chorus at the Royal Albert Hall when Richard Wagner conducted, and he visited Bayreuth and Dresden. He later prepared the Royal Choral Society in Wagner's Parsifal for two concert performances at the Royal Albert Hall in 1884.

Faning began composing while a student, producing an overture and two string quartets in 1871, and a symphony in 1872. In 1873 he was elected an extra Mendelssohn Scholar, and in 1876 he obtained the Charles Lucas Medal for composition for his setting of the Magnificat. Sir John Stainer heard the work and selected it for performance at the Festival of the Sons of the Clergy in 1878, and the publishers Novello & Co printed an edition of the score. During his Academy years, he was organist successively of St. Thomas's Church, Paddington and St. John's Church, Lewisham. He conducted two amateur musical societies and "Mr. Eaton Faning's Select Choir," a professional group that sang at Boosey's London Ballad Concerts.

=== Composer and teacher ===
Savoy Theatre programme for Faning's Mock Turtles

Faning was appointed to the staff of the Academy in 1874 as a sub-professor of harmony, an assistant professor of the piano in 1877, and full professor a year later. In 1877 he was elected an Associate, and in 1881 a Fellow of the Academy, its highest honour for a former student. On 18 July 1877, the Academy hosted the performance of Faning's comic operetta in one act, The Two Majors. The libretto, by Edward Rose, was adapted from one of W. S. Gilbert's "Bab Ballads". Sullivan "took a warm and practical interest" in the composition of Faning's score. The piece was described by The Musical Times as "highly amusing and capital … with its clever parodies of some of the absurdities of Italian opera … capitally rendered, under the composer's direction". Another critic praised the music and the staging, though adding that as it was a student performance, "there was a necessary elongation of those garments over which the Lord Chamberlain traditionally keeps such jealous watch and ward." The success of Faning's piece led the faculty of the Academy to establish an operatic class.

In October 1881, Faning's second comic operetta, Mock Turtles, was produced at the Savoy Theatre as a curtain-raiser to Gilbert and Sullivan's Patience. It ran in tandem with Patience and then Iolanthe until March 1883. The D'Oyly Carte Opera Company also toured the piece in the British provinces. In 1882 Faning wrote his third short operetta The Head of the Poll, presented by the German Reeds, with a libretto by Arthur Law. The reviews were good, though they concentrated on the libretto, praising the music in passing as "very spirited", "pretty" and "merry and melodious". In the same year Faning's overture The Holiday was played at the promenade concerts, Covent Garden.

In August 1882 Faning married Caroline Pare Galpin. They had one son and three daughters. Faning composed a comic "Savage Dance" (intermezzo) for orchestra, and he conducted it, dressed "in the garb of a savage", for The Savage Club entertainment at the Royal Albert Hall in July 1883. This was a fund-raising concert for the Royal College of Music in the presence of the Prince and Princess of Wales. His other compositions ranged from Buttercups and Daisies, a pastoral cantata for children's voices (1892), a Mass in B minor, works for solo piano, and a variety of songs and choral works. His two most popular songs were "I've something sweet to tell you," and a part song (originally with piano accompaniment, later orchestrated), "The Vikings".

In addition to his professorship at the Royal Academy of Music, Faning was a professor of the piano at the Guildhall School of Music from 1882; a professor of the piano and harmony, and conductor of the choral class at the National Training School of Music. He remained in those posts when the School became the Royal College of Music in 1883, continuing there until 1887. In 1885, Faning accepted the post of director of music of Harrow School, where music was given great importance. He had a staff of six assistant music masters, and remained at Harrow until 1901. Faning received the degree Doctor of Music from Trinity College, Cambridge, in January 1900.

He retired to Brighton, where he died at the age of 77.
