= Ages Ago =

Musical entertainment by W. S. Gilbert and Frederic Clay

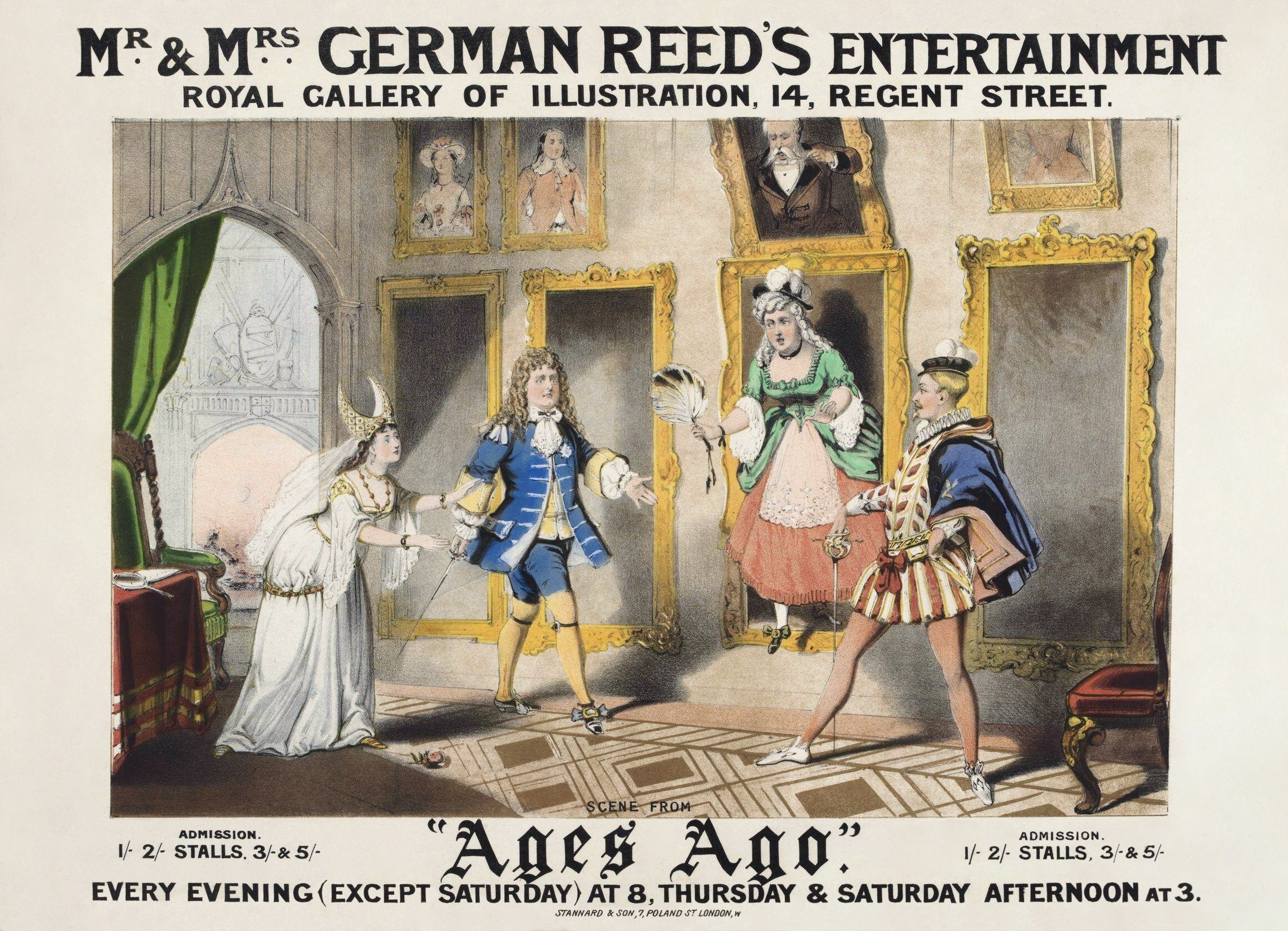
Poster advertising Ages Ago, 1869

Ages Ago, sometimes stylised as Ages Ago! or Ages Ago!!, is a musical entertainment with a libretto by W. S. Gilbert and music by Frederic Clay that premiered on 22 November 1869 at the Royal Gallery of Illustration. It marked the beginning of a seven-year collaboration between Gilbert and Clay. The piece was a critical and popular success and was revived many times, including at St. George's Hall, London in 1870 and 1874, and in New York in 1880.

== Background ==
By the 1850s, the London stage had fallen into disrepute. Shakespeare's plays were staged, but most of the entertainments consisted of poorly translated French operettas, risque Victorian burlesques and vulgar broad farces. To bring family-friendly entertainment back to the theatre, Thomas German Reed and his wife Priscilla opened their Gallery of Illustration in 1855 and brought in Gilbert in 1869 as one of their many playwrights. The Gallery of Illustration was a 500-seat theatre with a small stage that only allowed for four or five characters with accompaniment by a piano, harmonium and sometimes a harp.

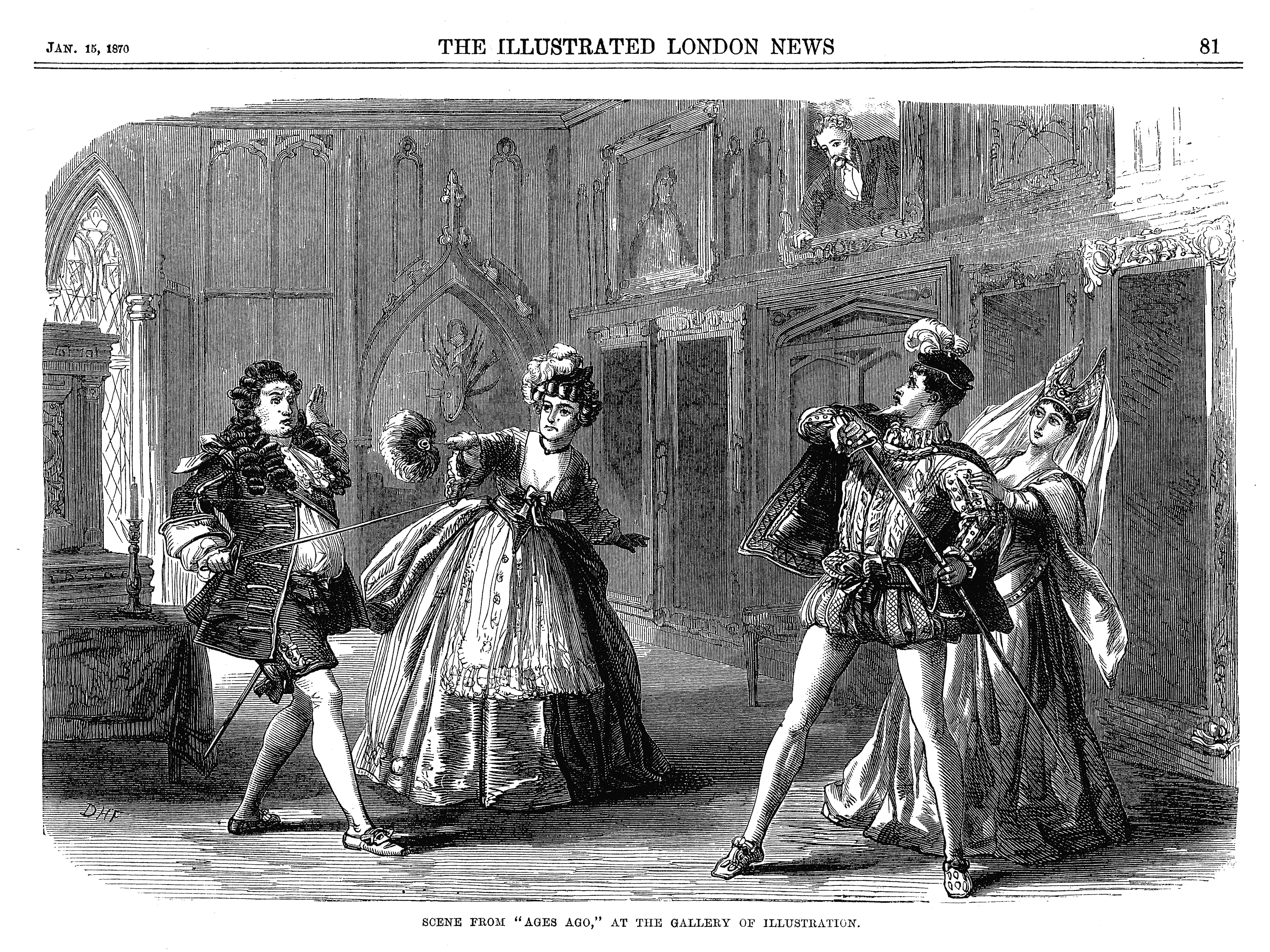
A scene from Ages Ago, The Illustrated London News, 15 January 1870

After Gilbert's first offering for the Gallery of Illustration – No Cards, with music by Reed, Gilbert paired with Clay on Ages Ago, the first of a successful series of collaborations between the author and composer that would continue for the next seven years. In the eight months between the productions of No Cards, and Ages Ago, Gilbert's dramatic style had developed. Ages Ago, with its double-layered plot and its complex relationships among the characters, is more sophisticated than No Cards, which was a simple farce. In addition, the lyrics move the plot forward more than in the earlier work.

Ages Ago earned praise from the critics, outran its companion piece, the popular Cox and Box, and was frequently revived over the next decade. It was Gilbert's and the Gallery's greatest success to that date, running for 350 performances from November 1869 to June 1870. A review in the Penny Illustrated Paper described the piece as "a very brilliant, sparkling operetta, full of ingenious fun in the plot and dialogue, and exhibiting a good deal of grace and freshness in the music. ... The piece went off most successfully, a satisfactory proof that extravaganzas written without vulgarity can be relished by the public. The dialogue is smart as well as polished, and contains several hits on current town topics, not one of which misses fire."

The work was revived at St. George's Hall in 1870 and again in 1874, among others. At the 1874 revival, Mrs. German Reed, Leonora Braham, Alfred Reed, Stanley Betjeman, Corney Grain, and the piece itself all received warm praise from the Era's critic. New York's reopened Broadway Opera House was inaugurated in 1880 with a double bill of Ages Ago and Charity Begins at Home. Ages Ago has been revived from time to time by amateur companies. In 2014, a production at the International Gilbert and Sullivan Festival, in the Harrogate Theatre, was billed as the first professional production in 130 years.

Gilbert produced four more pieces for Reed, including A Sensation Novel in 1871 and Eyes and No Eyes in 1875. He also wrote several comic operas with Clay, the last of which was Princess Toto in 1876. Thomas German Reed played Ebenezer Tare, while his wife played Mrs. MacMotherly. The piece also introduced Fanny Holland, who would play in many pieces for the German Reeds for years to come.

At a rehearsal for Ages Ago, Clay formally introduced the composer Arthur Sullivan to Gilbert. The two later collaborated on fourteen comic operas that became the most enduring pieces of musical theatre from the Victorian era. Gilbert would later reuse many ideas and plot elements from these earlier works in the Gilbert and Sullivan operas, and, in particular, the idea of the portraits coming to life in Ages Ago is reused in Ruddigore (1888).

== Synopsis ==
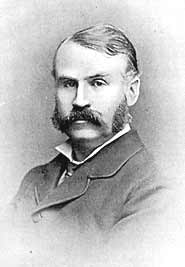
W.S. Gilbert in about 1870

In the haunted Scottish Castle of Glen Cockaleekie, where the title deed to the castle, much like in Brigadoon, is only found once every hundred years, Sir Ebenezer Tare has decided that, as "possession is nine-tenths of the law," he might as well be in possession of the castle until such time as the deed shows up again. Being the type of a Victorian money-grubbing elderly relative, he refuses to let his niece Rosa marry her poor suitor, Columbus Hebblethwaite, who is staying for the night. The Scottish housekeeper, Mrs. MacMotherly, has second sight. She tells a tale of the original wicked Sir Roger Bohun (similarly to Dame Hannah's tale in Gilbert and Sullivan's later Ruddigore).

That night, the paintings of the castle's former owners come to life and step out of their frames (as would happen again in Ruddigore). However, a problem ensues: They were all painted at different ages, so Lord Carnaby, painted in the early 18th century at age 65, lusts after his grandmother (Lady Maud), painted by Leonardo da Vinci in the 15th century at age 17. Lady Maude finds more in common with Sir Cecil Blount, painted in the 16th century by Michelangelo at age 20. Eventually, though, and after some wrangling, Dame Cherry (painted by Joshua Reynolds in the late 18th century at age 56) and Lord Carnaby settle into middle-aged affection, while the "old" young people pair off romantically and get a painting of Brown, a solicitor, to marry them.

At daybreak, they return to their frames, leaving the deed behind, which gives the property to Hebblethwaite, the poor suitor. He strikes a deal whereby if uncle Tare permits Rosa to marry him, then he will allow Tare to stay on at the castle, and all ends happily.

== Roles ==
- Sir Ebenezer Tare of the firm of Tare and Tret, Alderman and Tallow Chandler, later Lord Carnaby Poppytop (baritone) – Thomas German Reed
- Rosa (his niece), later Lady Maud (soprano) – Fanny Holland
- Mrs. MacMotherly, later Dame Cherry Maybud (contralto) – Priscilla German Reed
- Mr. Columbus Hebblethwaite, later Sir Cecil Blount (tenor) – Arthur Cecil
- Angus McTavish (Steward), later Brown (bass) – Edward Connell
- Lady Maud de Bohun, Born 1445
  - Came into possession 1469 (Costume: Tenth year of Edward IV)
  - Painted by Leonardo da Vinci 1472 (Aged 17)
  - Died 1473 (Louis XI)
- Sir Cecil Blount, Born 1540 (Costume: Second year of Elizabeth I)
  - Painted by Michelangelo 1560 (Aged 20)
  - Came into possession 1569 (Henry II to IV)
  - Died 1579
- Lord Carnaby Poppytop, Born 1648
  - Came into possession 1669 (Costume: Last year of Queen Anne's reign)
  - Painted by Godfrey Kneller 1713 (Aged 65)
  - Died 1720
- Dame Cherry Maybud, Born 1730
  - Came into possession 1769 (Costume: Twenty-fifth year of George III)
  - Painted by Sir Joshua Reynolds 1785 (Aged 55)
- Brown – Born about 1830 (Costume: Late 19th century Cockney Dress)

== Musical numbers ==
The music is written for piano, harmonium and harp. The published libretto omits three songs (Goodbye Goodbye, When Nature Sleeps, and Eh! What is That Ye Say) which are usually included in the sheet music. The online Gilbert and Sullivan Archive states, "It is likely that there was additional dialogue accompanying these beginning songs, but if so this is now lost."

The following numbering of the songs follows that of the vocal score. The libretto does not include the songs through number 4, and numbers the song labelled as song 5 below as song 1. Thus, to determine the number given to a song in the printed libretto, subtract 4 from the number assigned to that song below.

- No. 1. "Prelude"
- No. 2. Goodbye, Goodbye – Rosa, Mrs. Mac Motherly, and Steward
- No. 3. When nature sleeps – Rosa, Mrs. Mac Motherly
- No. 4. Eh! What is that ye say – Mrs. MacMotherley (with Rosa and Tare)
- No. 5. Ha! What was that / Permit me a short explanation: Tare, Rosa, Hebblethwaite and Company.
- No. 6. It does perplex, annoy and vex – Hebblethwaite, Rosa and Company
- No. 7. We fly to fields of fancy – Mrs. MacMotherly, Hebblethwaite, Tare and Steward
- No. 8. Entr'acte and Recit: I breathe, I live – Lady Maud
- No. 9. Moments so fleeting – Lady Maud
- No. 10. Would you know that maiden fair – Lady Maud and Sir Cecil
- No. 11. In pity tell, O Lady mine – Lady Maud and Sir Cecil
- No. 12. I stand on my authority – Lady Maud, Sir Cecil and Lord Carnaby
- No. 13. At twenty-three Lord Carnaby – Lord Carnaby and Dame Cherry
- No. 14. 'Tis Done, the spell is broken – Lady Maud, Dame Cherry, Sir Cecil, Lord Carnaby and Mr. Brown
- No. 15. The subject drop (Finale, reprise of "It does perplex, annoy and vex") - Rosa, Mrs. MacMotherly, Hebblethwaite, Tare, Steward.
