= Happy Arcadia =

Operetta by W. S. Gilbert and Frederic Clay

Rutland Barrington as Strephon in an 1895 revival of Happy Arcadia

Happy Arcadia is a musical entertainment with a libretto by W. S. Gilbert and music originally by Frederic Clay that premiered on 28 October 1872 at the Royal Gallery of Illustration. It was one of four collaborations between Gilbert and Clay between 1869 and 1876. The music is lost. The piece is a satire on the genre of pastoral plays in which the characters, who each wish that they could be someone else, have their wish granted, with unhappy results.

Gilbert and Sullivan later produced a comic opera, Iolanthe, in which two of the characters, Strephon and Phyllis, are "Arcadian" shepherds. Phyllis, like Chloe, is torn between two suitors. The character of Lycidas also anticipates the character of Archibald Grosvenor in another Gilbert and Sullivan opera, Patience, who is cursed with perfect beauty.

== Background ==
This work is the fifth in a series of six one-act musical plays written by Gilbert for Thomas German Reed and his wife Priscilla between 1869 and 1875. The German Reeds presented respectable, family-friendly musical entertainments at their Gallery of Illustration beginning in 1855. The German Reeds did not call their venue a theatre because, at that time, the theatre in Britain had gained a poor reputation as an unsavory institution and was not attended by much of the middle class; Shakespeare was played, but most theatrical entertainments consisted of poorly translated French operettas, risque burlesques and incomprehensible broad farces. The Gallery of Illustration was a 500-seat theatre with a small stage that only allowed for four or five characters with accompaniment by a piano, harmonium and sometimes a harp.

The title of Happy Arcadia is an oxymoron, as the inhabitants of this fictional Arcadia are anything but happy. Arcadia was a legendary site of rural perfection, first described by the Ancient Greeks, that was a popular setting for writers of the 19th century and artists such as Jean-Antoine Watteau. Happy Arcadia is a satire on the genre of pastoral plays, which were set in an ideal world. The piece has a typical Gilbertian topsy-turvy plot in which magic items grant wishes, and each of the characters uses his or her wish to become someone else. The magic items cause the sort of transformation that fascinated Gilbert throughout his career and that he used in all his "lozenge plot" works, including The Sorcerer, Foggerty's Fairy and The Mountebanks. Theatre historian Kurt Gänzl noted that "the highlight of the show was a scene in which, various jealousies having arisen, everyone is simultaneously wishing he were one of the others – and consequently everyone is! [demonstrating Gilbert's] favourite theme of change of identity or personality."

As the original score is long lost, others have created their own, and Jonathan Strong's adaptation of Sullivan's non-Gilbert and Sullivan music may be heard on the video of the work by the Boston Massachusetts-based group, Royal Victorian Opera Company.

Gilbert (who directed and designed his own shows) was busy in the days leading up to the opening of Happy Arcadia: Four days before Happy Arcadia opened, Gilbert's one-act farce, A Medical Man, opened at St. George's Hall, although it had been published in 1870. The original production of Happy Arcadia played from 28 October 1872 to 2 May 1873. A revival, produced by and starring Rutland Barrington, played at St George's Hall from 15 July 1895 to 10 August and again from 4 November until 30 November 1895. Although Happy Arcadia was one of the later pieces by Gilbert for the German Reeds, it was a step backwards in terms of dramatic development.

== Synopsis ==
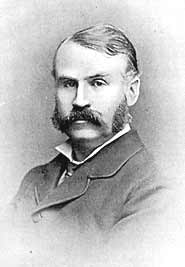
W.S. Gilbert in about 1870

Chloe and Strephon are "completely and intensely miserable. Bored beyond expression." They hate their lambs and flageolets. Chloe: "I always pinch my lamb when nobody's looking." Strephon: "And I always play out of tune when nobody's listening". They irritably agree to break off their engagement. Chloe's parents are also miserable. Her father was a criminal who evaded punishment by fleeing to Arcadia and is now tired of living a life of innocence. He would happily return to a life of iniquity if he could do so without being sentenced to penal servitude. Meanwhile, Strephon's lodger, Astrologos, owes him three months' rent, but as an Arcadian, Strephon can't ask him to pay it, since Arcadians don't care about money. Astrologos notes that he has four magic items, a stick, a ring, a cloak, and a cap, each of which grants one wish, but that he has used up the wishes.

Daphne has news: The handsome, wealthy, gifted Lycidas has determined to renounce the vanities of a worldly life and is going to become an Arcadian, and he has taken a fancy to Chloe. Strephon protests that Chloe is betrothed to him, and that, to put up a fight, he'll resign from Arcadia. Lycidas appears, saying he will live in Arcadia, and he asks to be left alone with Chloe. Strephon reluctantly withdraws, and Lycidas asks Chloe to "be mine". Strephon returns with a stick, and Lycidas withdraws, agreeing to return in half an hour. Strephon says that he is no longer an Arcadian and will smash Lycidas if he presumes to address Chloe again.

Astrologos has departed, leaving a package for Strephon containing the four magic items. The instructions say, "Distribute them as you think fit". Strephon decides to auction off three of the items. Each item is auctioned off for four pence. Daphne, left alone, inadvertently wishes that she were in Strephon's shoes, and she immediately changes into Strephon. Meanwhile, Colin has turned into Daphne – as a woman, he would be able to get away with crimes. Chloe has changed into Colin, hoping to be "a grumpy... old bear like papa," to be out from between her two suitors. Strephon has turned into Chloe. Everyone is distressed by their transformations, and the idea occurs to them that if they exchange magic items, they will each get another wish. They do so and wish to return to their original forms, which they do, and they all happily embrace. Lycidas returns, declaring that Arcadia is no place for him, and he is leaving. They auction all the items to Lycidas, and all ends happily.

== Roles and casts of 1872 and 1895 productions ==
| Role | 1872 casting | 1895 casting |
|---|---|---|
| Strephon – A happy Arcadian, betrothed to Chloe (tenor) | Arthur Cecil | Rutland Barrington |
| Colin – A virtuous old peasant, father of Chloe (baritone) | Alfred Reed | Charles Wibrow |
| Daphne – An elderly Arcadian, Chloe's mama (married to Colin) (contralto) | Priscilla German Reed | Fanny Holland (then Emily Cross, then Marion German Reed) |
| Chloe – A happy Arcadian, betrothed to Strephon (soprano) | Fanny Holland | Maria Garcia (replaced by Chrystal Duncan) |
| Astrologos – A blighted bogey (speaking role) | R. Corney Grain | George Traill (then Roland Carse) |
| Lycidas – The handsomest man in all the world (unknown vocal range) | R. Corney Grain | Hilton St Just |

== Musical numbers ==
- 1. Duet. "Let us sing" (Strephon and Chloe)
- 1b. Song. "When I was seventeen" (Daphne; only appears in early versions of the libretto)
- 2. Song. "Only a Woman" (Colin) [begins "From the first it was always the same"]
- 3. Scene. "Fair love" (Strephon, with interjections by Astrologos)
- 4. Song. "There's naught but care, and toil, and strife. (Strephon)
- 5. Entrance of Lycidas: "Welcome to this spot" (Chloe, Daphne, Strephon, Colin), "Far away from care and strife" (Lycidas) and "On the banks of every stream" (Ensemble)
- 5b. Ballad: "The Way of Wooing" (Chloe; only appears in early versions of the libretto)
- 6. Quartette. "Good people all, attend, attend to me" (Strephon and ensemble)
- 7. Identity quartette. "The question of identity, Suppose we now discuss" (Colin, Chloe, Daphne, Strephon)
- 8. Finale. "In this innocent little vale" (Strephon and ensemble; reprises "Good people all, attend, attend to me")
