= Our Island Home =

Musical entertainment by W. S. Gilbert and Thomas German Reed

Drawing from script of Our Island Home

Our Island Home is a one-act musical entertainment with a libretto by W. S. Gilbert and music by Thomas German Reed that premiered on 20 June 1870 at the Royal Gallery of Illustration. The piece has five characters and is "biographical", in that the characters in the original production played themselves, except that they were given personalities opposite to their actual personalities.

== Background ==
This work is the third in a series of six one-act musical plays written by Gilbert for Thomas German Reed and his wife Priscilla between 1869 and 1875. The German Reeds presented respectable, family-friendly musical entertainments at their Gallery of Illustration beginning in 1855, at a time when the theatre in Britain had gained a poor reputation as an unsavory institution and was not attended by much of the middle class. Shakespeare was played, but most of the entertainments consisted of poorly translated French operettas, risque Victorian burlesques and incomprehensible broad farces. The Gallery of Illustration was a 500-seat theatre with a small stage that only allowed for four or five characters with accompaniment by a piano, harmonium and sometimes a harp.

Our Island Home takes its name from Alfred Tennyson's poem "The Lotos-Eaters". It is set on the shore of an island in the Indian Ocean. German Reed had hoped that Arthur Sullivan would set the music for the piece and had written to ask him. Sullivan requested a higher price than the Reeds could afford, and so Reed wrote the music himself.

This work introduced a number of the characters that Gilbert would use consistently in his later operas, including the overbearing, mature contralto and the meek, submissive baritone. Many of the elements in the piece are precursors to similar elements in Gilbert and Sullivan's famous 1879 opera, The Pirates of Penzance. The pirate "chief", Captain Bang, became the Pirate King in Pirates. Bang was also a precursor to the Frederic character, having been mistakenly apprenticed to a pirate band as a child by his deaf nursemaid. Similarly, Bang, like Frederic, has never seen a woman before. Also, he is affected by so keen a sense of duty as an apprenticed pirate that he is prepared to slaughter his own parents until the discovery of the passage of his twenty-first birthday frees him from his articles of indenture.

Captain Bang also exhibits elements of H.M.S. Pinafore's Captain Corcoran and Sir Joseph, rolled into one:

I'm a hardy sailor, too;
I've a vessel and a crew
When it doesn't blow a gale
I can reef a little sail.
I never go below
And I generally know
The weather from the lee,
And I'm never sick at sea.

The original performers in Our Island Home played themselves. However, in a typical Gilbertian twist, their personae were the opposite of those in real life. As they were personally known to many in their audiences, this was a very successful "in-joke".

== Roles ==
- Priscilla German Reed (contralto)
- Thomas German Reed (baritone)
- Fanny Holland (soprano)
- Arthur Cecil (tenor)
- Captain Bang, A Pirate chief (R. Corney Grain, later Edward (Alfred) Reed)

== Synopsis ==
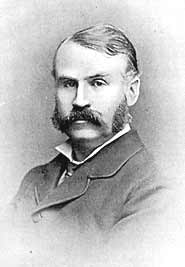
W.S. Gilbert in about 1870

The German Reeds' theatre company find themselves on a desert island, having been thrown off their ship on their way back home after an Asiatic tour of Ages Ago for insisting on presenting the work every night on board the ship. The overbearing Mrs. Reed divides the island in quarters and, unfortunately, awards the only fertile part of the island to the despotic Mr. Cecil, who forces the others to rhyme or sing to him (and cook for him) to be fed. He also terrifies the others with his evil glance. Cecil has a soft life and everything he wants... except anchovy paste.

Fortunately, a cask washes up onshore filled with anchovy paste. The German Reeds strike a more equitable deal with Cecil: He gets the paste, and they switch sides on the island. Cecil's part of the island turns out to be made of solid gold. Just then, a ship arrives, and with it, the melodramatic Captain Bang: "Oh, tremble! I'm a Pirate Chief; Who comes upon me comes to grief." Bang explains that he is bound by his duty under his pirate indentures to execute his four new acquaintances. He explains his history:

I was the only son of a kind indulgent father and a kind indulgent mother, whose only care was to gratify my smallest whim. On my seventh birthday my kind father asked me what I would like to be. I had always a hankering for a sea-life; at the same time I didn't want to leave them for long, for oh, I was an affectionate son. So I told them I should like to be a pilot. My kind papa consented and sent me with my nurse to the nearest sea-front, telling her to apprentice me to a pilot. The girl – a very good girl, but stupid – mistaking her instructions, apprenticed me to a pirate of her acquaintance and bound me over to serve him diligently and faithfully until I reached the age of twenty-one. We sailed that evening, and I have never seen my native land since.

German Reed recognises Captain Bang as his long lost son. Nevertheless, Bang explains that by his articles of apprenticeship, he is bound to slaughter every prisoner he takes, and his indentures do not expire until the next day. However, based on the party's present longitude, it is determined that Bang has just turned 21. Bang agrees to take them all home on his ship.

== Musical numbers ==
- 1. Carol – "Rise, pretty one, awaken" (Mr. Reed, Mrs. Reed and Miss Holland)
- 2. Duet – "Oh Mr. Cecil, Sir, how can you?" (Miss Holland and Mr. Cecil)
- 3. Trio – "Hurrah, a sail!" (Mrs. Reed, Miss Holland and Mr. Cecil)
- 4. Quartette – "Cask Catch"
- 5. Quartette – "Memorandum of agreement"
- 6. Song – "Oh, tremble! I'm a Pirate Chief" (Captain Bang)
- 7. Finale – "Hurrah, a sail!"
