= Corney Grain =

British entertainer (1844–1895)

Richard Corney Grain
- Richard Corney Grain, 1880s
- Born: 26 October 1844; Teversham
- Died: 16 March 1895 (aged 50); London
- Occupations: entertainer, songwriter

Richard Corney Grain (26 October 1844 – 16 March 1895), known by his stage name Corney Grain, was an entertainer and songwriter of the late Victorian era.

== Biography ==
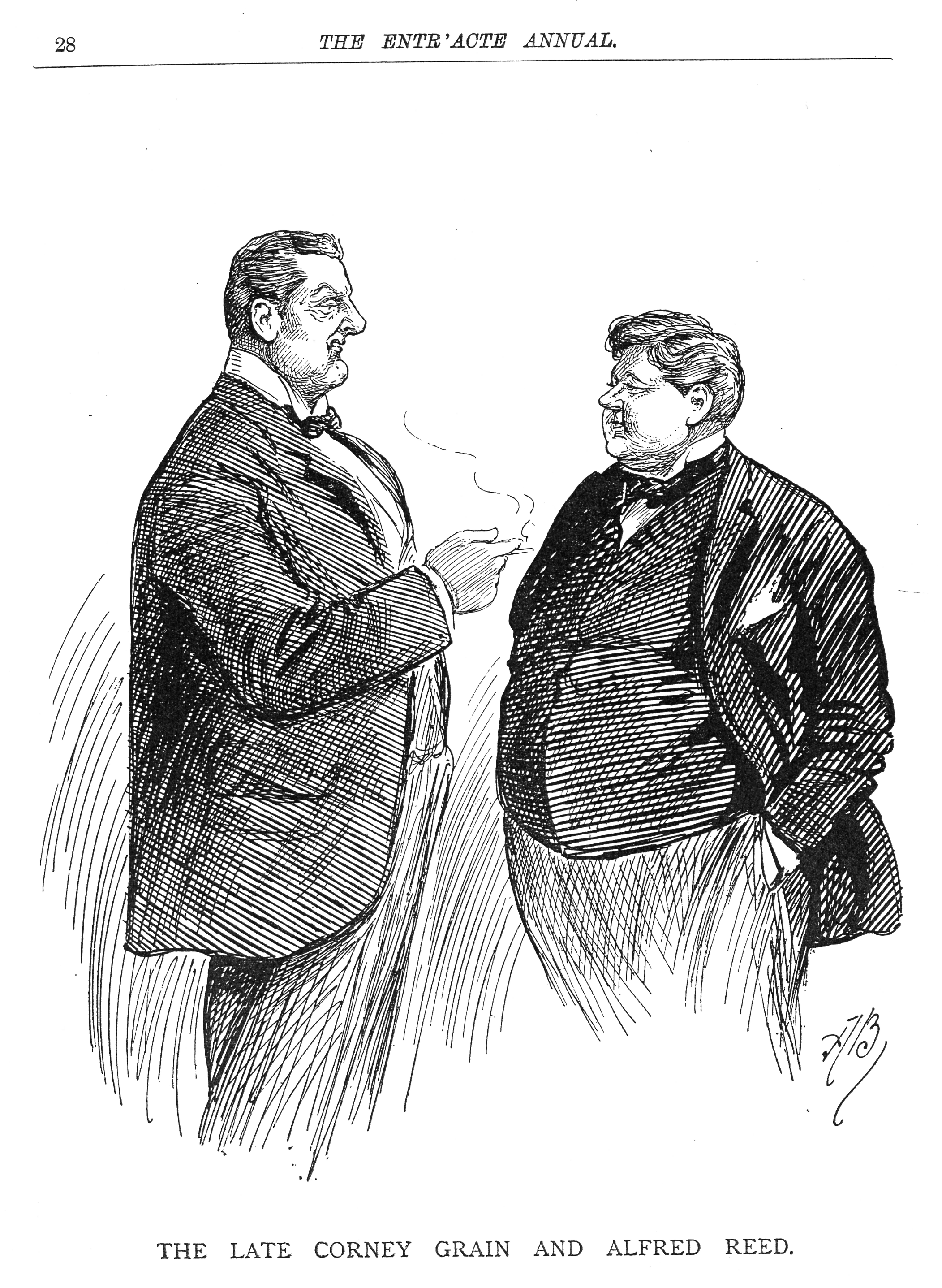
Corney Grain (left) and Alfred German Reed (right) portrayed in Entr'acte in 1895, the year they both died

Born at Teversham in Cambridgeshire, Grain was the youngest son of John Grain, a farmer, and his wife, Mary Anne. His sister, Harriet Ann, was the mother of the barrister and judge Sir Travers Humphreys. Grain received what he referred to as "an average middle-class education". In 1858, at the age of 14, he attended school in Germany. Returning to Britain with an interest in the Law, he enrolled as a student of the Inner Temple on 27 April 1863, and was called to the Bar on 30 April 1866. For a while he practised law on the Western Circuit. However, he had theatrical leanings, and sang and acted in private.

=== Career ===
Deciding to give up a legal career and try his hand on the stage, on 16 May 1870 Grain joined what was known as the German Reed Entertainments, at the Gallery of Illustration, appearing in a sketch of his own called The School-Feast. At the same time, Grain entertained privately, performing his comic musical sketches at the piano for fashionable parties and other venues.

Grain remained with the German Reeds until the end of his life and, after the death of another German Reed stalwart, John Orlando Parry, Grain became the company's principal comedian and sketch artist. He moved with the company to St George's Hall, toured with it in the provinces, and in 1877, after the retirement of Priscilla German Reed, became the partner of the German Reeds' son, Alfred German Reed (1847–1895), who shared the management of the company with his mother from 1871. Over twenty-five years, Grain wrote between fifty and sixty entertainments for the company, consisting of social sketches and songs with piano accompaniment. His songs included "The Masher King of Piccadilly" and "The Four-Horse Sharrybang". His private performances of comic sketches also remained fashionable throughout his career. His last sketch was Music à la mode.

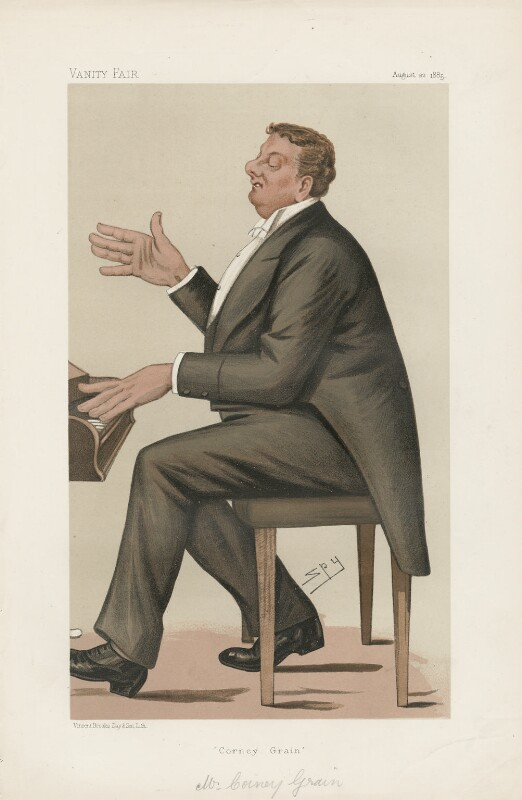
Richard Corney Grain as depicted by 'Spy' in Vanity Fair in 1885

Grain was a large man with exceptionally large and expressive hands. On occasion he took part in comediettas or other dramatic performances, but he claimed that he did not enjoy acting and was not very good at it. W. S. Gilbert disagreed, asking him to perform in several of his pieces at the Gallery of Illustration between 1869 and 1875, including his absurdist comedy with the German Reeds, Happy Arcadia, as "the handsomest man in the world", because of Grain's comical appearance. Similarly in Gilbert's A Sensation Novel, he played the "spirit of romance". He also played in Gilbert's Our Island Home, Ages Ago and Eyes and No Eyes (amusingly, as Pierrot). Grain was a great friend and rival of Gilbert and Sullivan performer and fellow sketch-artist, George Grossmith.

His autobiography, Corney Grain, by Himself, first appeared in Murray's Magazine and was later issued as a book in 1888. He died of "epidemic influenza" on 16 March 1895, at his home in Marylebone, London. His death, six days after that of Alfred German Reed, ended the German Reed Entertainments, which had been popular for forty years.
