= Eyes and No Eyes =

One-act musical entertainment by W. S. Gilbert and Thomas German Reed

1896 score published by Joseph Williams

Eyes and No Eyes, or The Art of Seeing is a one-act musical entertainment with a libretto by W. S. Gilbert and music originally by Thomas German Reed. The story concerns two sisters who love flirtatious twin brothers (though it is not certain which loves which). The sisters lose their uncle's wedding cloak. To avoid his anger, they persuade him that the cloak is magically visible only to true lovers and invisible to flirts.

The entertainment premiered in 1875 at St. George's Hall in London. The original music was lost, and twenty years later new music was composed by "Florian Pascal" (a pseudonym for Joseph Williams Jr. (1847–1923), a music publisher who acquired the copyright to the show). It was then published, but not immediately performed.

== Background ==
This work is the last in a series of six one-act musical plays written by Gilbert for Thomas German Reed and his wife Priscilla between 1869 and 1875. The German Reeds presented respectable, family-friendly musical entertainments beginning in 1855, at a time when the theatre in Britain had gained a poor reputation as an unsavoury institution and was not attended by much of the middle class. Shakespeare was played, but most of the entertainments consisted of poorly translated French operettas, risqué Victorian burlesques and incomprehensible broad farces.

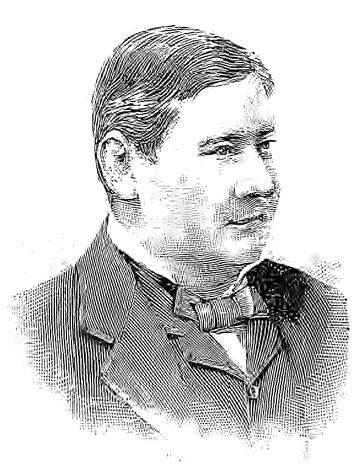
Alfred Reed, son of Thomas German Reed

Gilbert took his title from a children's story, "Eyes and No Eyes; or, The Art of Seeing", in a 1799 collection of early children's literature, Evenings at Home. The didactic children's story compares one child's recollection of a boring walk with another's description of the many interesting things he saw on the same walk by slowing down to pay attention to his surroundings. Gilbert's libretto is loosely based on Hans Andersen's 1837 story, "The Emperor's New Clothes". Gilbert wrote in a programme note: "Hans Andersen has a tale in which two persons, for reasons of their own, pretend that an imaginary and non-existent garment is visible only to true and faithful men. As a natural consequence every one pretends that he can see it. On this hint the piece is founded." Both stories would have been familiar to Gilbert's audience. As the theatrical newspaper The Era commented, "Everyone must remember the nursery story of 'Eyes and No Eyes', but how few there are who appear to profit by the lesson it teaches!"

Although written before Gilbert and Sullivan's 1875 opera Trial by Jury, this work was not staged until after Trial had become a hit. During this period, both Gilbert and Arthur Sullivan were still producing a considerable amount of work separately. Sullivan's The Zoo also premiered in 1875. Eyes and No Eyes was originally played in a triple bill with Corney Grain's musical sketch, R.S.V.P., and the play Very Catching by F. C. Burnand. After the first run, Eyes and No Eyes was revived by Reed in October 1875.

Eyes and No Eyes is the most tightly written of Gilbert's libretti for the German Reed Entertainments. The story uses characters from the Harlequinade. The opening scene of the piece reveals Clochette alone, singing as she sits at the spinning wheel. Gilbert and Sullivan would reuse this idea in the opening scene of their 1888 opera, The Yeomen of the Guard. Like Gilbert's 1871 entertainment, A Sensation Novel, the work was rescored by Pascal two decades later in a style reminiscent of early Debussy, but unlike his score for A Sensation Novel, it seems to fit this work well.

== Productions ==
Eyes and No Eyes premiered on 5 July 1875 at St. George's Hall in London and ran for only a month. The piece is still occasionally played by amateur societies, and 21st century stagings include those at the International Gilbert and Sullivan Festival in 2006, by Light Opera of New York in 2008 in New York City and by All-in-One Productions at the 2018 Edinburgh Festival Fringe as part of the Free Fringe.

== Roles ==
- Cassandre, a wealthy farmer, in love with Nicolette (bass) – Alfred Reed
- Columbine, his niece (mezzo-soprano) – Fanny Holland
- Clochette, his niece (soprano) – Leonora Braham
- Arlequin (baritone) – Alfred Bishop
- Pierrot, his twin brother (tenor) – R. Corney Grain
- Nicolette, an old coquette (contralto) – Priscilla German Reed

Note, some of the character names are those of the stock characters of the Harlequinade. Others suggest French romances.

== Synopsis ==
Clochette and Columbine are sisters living in the house of their uncle, Cassandre, who is engaged to be married to Nicolette. The sisters are beloved by twin brothers, Arlequin and Pierrot, but the two men say they love them equally and cannot decide which one each adores more.

Clochette is sitting at her spinning wheel, working on her wedding linen ("As I at my wheel sit spinning") before being interrupted by the arrival of Nicolette, who claims that she fascinates and destroys all who set their eyes on her ("Yes, yes, I am that miserable beauty"). She says that she has fascinated away the sisters' lovers, Pierrot and Arlequin, much to Clochette's annoyance. The brothers arrive after Nicolette leaves and discuss being twins ("Of our parents each child is a son"). Clochette confronts them about their flirting, but they see no problem because they flirt with all women. This does not entirely placate her, but she is waiting for Columbine to arrive, bringing a cloak for her uncle's wedding dress.

Columbine arrives, and the twins switch their affections over to her, but she is distracted. She has lost the cloak, and in a conversation repeatedly interrupted by the twins' professions of love ("Well, here's a very pretty state of things"), worries that her uncle will be angry when he finds his money gone and the cloak lost. The twins leave briefly, and the sisters devise a plan to protect themselves. Observing that their uncle and the others are all very flirtatious, they decide to pretend that the non-existent cloak is magically "visible only to true lovers, and absolutely invisible to flirts of every degree". When Pierrot and Arlequin return, they test out the ruse on them, pretending to admire it on each other, challenging the twins to describe it and letting them come up with justifications each time they get it wrong. Although convinced that it is real, the brothers admit to each other in private that they couldn't see it, but blame themselves for their flirting.

After everyone leaves, Uncle Cassandre enters and contemplates his engagement to Nicolette, an "acquired taste". He has spent thirty years learning to love all her odious attributes. Nicolette arrives, and they flirt. He remarks that while he is fifty-eight, she "is eight and twenty still" ("When you were eight-and twenty"). Columbine enters and persuades them that the magic cloak is visible only to true lovers. (Cut song: "When I was going along the road") Too nervous to "show" them the cloak, however, she states that Clochette has it. After the older couple leaves, Clochette enters, having found the lost cloak. Columbine is afraid that their uncle will beat her when he hears of the deception. Clochette has a bright thought: "Tell him you made a mistake, and that it’s visible to flirts and coquettes but invisible to true lovers." This they do ("Now, Columbine, the magic cloak produce"), and sure enough, Cassandre and Nicolette pretend not to be able to see the cloak. The brothers return, having "reformed", and are overjoyed to be able to see the cloak, sending Cassandre into a rage over what he thinks is evidence of their unfaithfulness. Now the twins and the older pair both demand to know what is the true nature of the magic. Thinking fast, the girls reply, "Well, uncle, in a kind of way you’re both right. It’s visible to true lovers under thirty, and invisible to true lovers over thirty." Everyone is satisfied by this (after Nicolette admits she was over thirty as of "the day before yesterday") and the uncle offers the girls to the boys. He flips a coin to decide which boy gets which girl. Once assigned, the boys complain that each loves the other girl, and the girls feel the same ("Agony and foul despair!"). The girls surreptitiously switch, and all ends happily.

== Musical numbers ==
- Introduction
- No. 1. "As I at my wheel sit spinning" (Clochette)
- No. 2. "Yes, yes, I am that miserable beauty" (Nicolette)
- No. 3. "Of our parents each child is the son" (Clochette, Pierrot, and Arlequin)
- No. 4. "Well, here's a very pretty state of things" (Clochette, Columbine, Pierrot and Arlequin)
- No. 4b. Untitled exit music for Pierrot and Arlequin (Instrumental, based on their section of the previous song)
- No. 5. "When you were eight and twenty" (Cassandre and Nicolette)
- No. 5b. Cut Song: "As I was going along the road" (Columbine)
- No. 6. "Now, Columbine, the magic cloak produce" (Cassandre, Nicolette, Columbine, and Clochette)
- No. 7. Finale — "Agony and fell despair"

== Reception ==
Reviews of the piece were mixed. The Era said, "The entertainment is certainly not equal to many other efforts of the same accomplished author, but it furnished considerable amusement to the audience." The Graphic devoted only 74 words to its review, but it praised the piece as "eminently amusing" and commented that the music was "as usual extremely lively." The Observer wrote, "It is ... disappointing to find the development of the little story marked by barrenness of incident and monotony of humour. The musical illustrations ... are not in Mr. German Reed's happiest or most original vein."
