= Royal Gallery of Illustration =

19th-century performance venue in London

Coordinates: 51.5089°N 0.1339°W

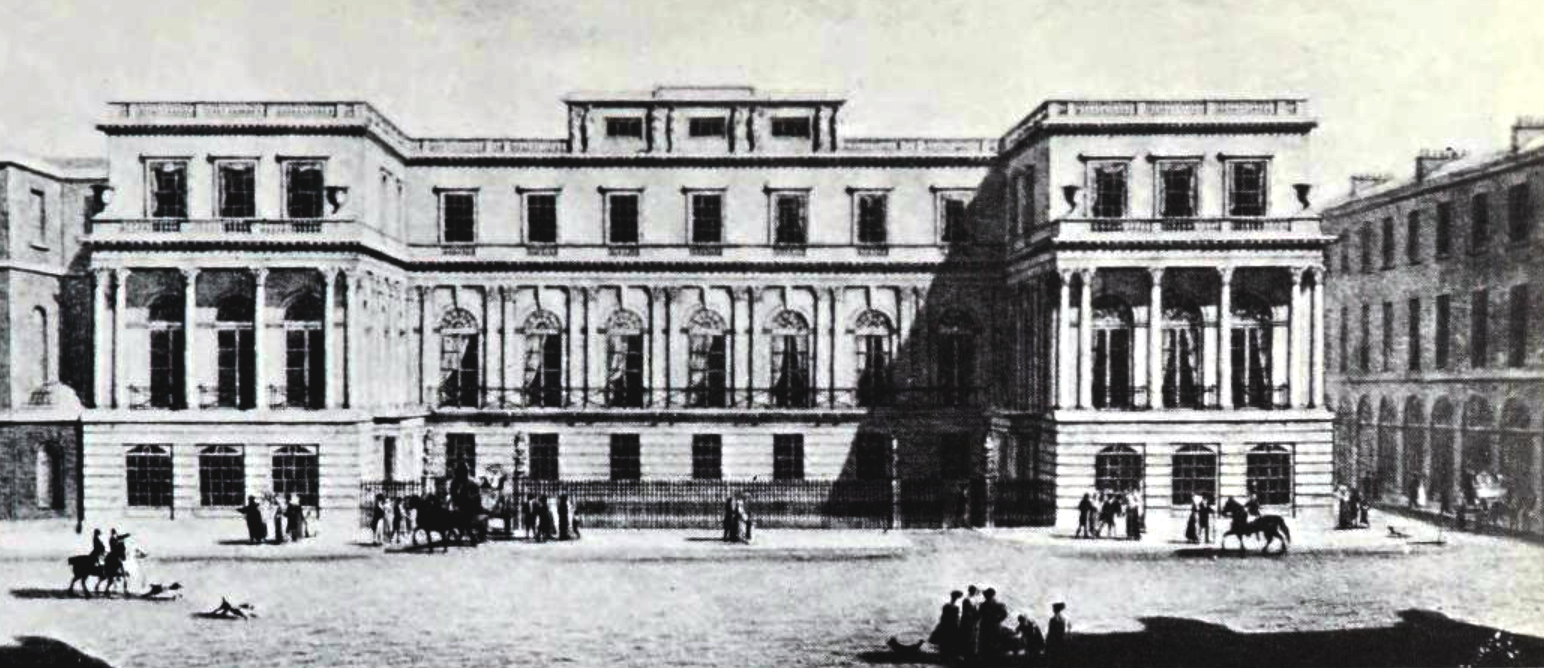
The Gallery of Illustration (right half of block)

The Royal Gallery of Illustration was a 19th-century performance venue located at 14 Regent Street in London. It was in use between 1850 and 1873.

The gallery was built in the 1820s by the architect John Nash as part of his own house, to display his considerable collection of paintings. In 1850 the building was named the Gallery of Illustration, and between then and 1855 it housed a diorama created and run by the theatrical scene-painters Thomas Grieve and William Telbin.

From 1856 to 1873 the gallery was in the hands of the singer and actress Priscilla Horton and her husband German Reed. Their entertainments developed from songs and comedy with piano accompaniment to programmes of short plays and operettas. In deference to respectable mid-Victorian doubts about the propriety of theatres, the Reeds called their productions "entertainments", and avoided the use of the words "theatre", "play" and other theatrical terms. Under the Reeds the gallery played an important part in the development of a new generation of authors, composers and performers. Among the writers whose works the Reeds staged were W. S. Gilbert and F. C. Burnand, and their composers included Arthur Sullivan, Frederic Clay and Alfred Cellier. The performers Arthur Cecil, Corney Grain and Fanny Holland made their names at the gallery early in their careers.

The lease of the building expired in 1873, and it ceased to be used as a performance venue. The Reeds moved to another theatre, and the gallery became a banqueting hall.

== History ==
=== 1824–1855 ===
Nash's original gallery

The gallery was built by the architect John Nash, designer of Regent Street, Regent's Park, and other urban improvements undertaken to the commission of King George IV. The gallery was part of Nash's own residence at 14 Regent Street, completed in 1824. It originally housed copies of paintings by Raphael in the Vatican, which Nash arranged, with papal permission, to be copied by top Roman artists of the time. He allowed members of the public to view the gallery by appointment. After his death the pictures were sold. (Note: They were acquired by the Victoria and Albert Museum.) The house was bought by an auctioneer called Rainy, who made it his business premises and used the gallery to display his wares in the 1830s and 1840s.

In 1850 the theatrical scene-painters Thomas Grieve and William Telbin took on the lease of the building. They opened it in March as the Gallery of Illustration, offering a diorama display with expert commentary and music. The first show, "Diorama of the Overland Route to India", opened in March 1850 and was a success with critics and public. A reviewer wrote:

This diorama is accompanied by appropriate music, comprising popular melodies from the best English, French, Spanish, Portuguese, Sicilian, Moorish, Egyptian, Arabian, and other sources. The entire journey is graphically described, as well as pictorially delineated, combining both amusement and instruction.

The Morning Chronicle reported in October that the show "continues to attract overflowing audiences to the Gallery of Illustration in Regent-street. Its extensive popularity, however, is no matter for wonder, as the subject treated is perhaps the finest that can be conceived for the purposes of scenic illustration". Grieve and Telbin followed this with "Diorama of Our Native Land" (1851), "Campaigns of the Duke of Wellington" (1852), "Diorama of the Arctic Regions" (1853), and "The Seat of War" (1854). The prefix "Royal" was added to the title of the establishment by late 1852, but it is not clear on what authority, if any.

=== 1856–1873 ===
The Reeds: Priscilla Horton and German Reed

Early in 1856 the singer and actress Priscilla Horton began to perform at the venue. Her entertainments given at St Martin's Hall had been popular, and with her husband, German Reed, (Note: Thomas German Reed dropped his first name in the 1840s.) at the piano and "the pictorial aid of Messrs Grieve and Telbin", she started giving what The Morning Chronicle called "her very clever impersonations" at the Royal Gallery of Illustration. The Reeds continued to perform at the gallery for seventeen years, in what were first billed as "Miss P. Horton's Illustrative Gatherings" and then "Mr and Mrs German Reed's Entertainments". (Note: During the Reeds' tenure the gallery hosted occasional performances by others. In July 1857 it was made available to an amateur group that included Charles Dickens, Mark Lemon and Wilkie Collins for three performances of Collins's romantic drama The Frozen Deep, given in aid of a charity; one performance was attended by Queen Victoria, Prince Albert and Leopold I of Belgium.) They quickly became public favourites: in 1859 The Daily News observed:

Since Messrs Grieve and Telbin have given up painting panoramas of historical events or travelled interest, and since Mr Stocqueler – undoubtedly the clearest, pleasantest, and most succinct lecturer of the day – has confined himself to the superintendence of young gentlemen's military education, the public has come to look upon the Gallery of Illustration as the special home of Mr and Mrs German Reed, and to regard them as the sole persons with any right to be there. When these pleasant entertainers are away on their provincial tour their room is sometimes let to a wandering amusement-provider with a panorama interspersed with comic songs, or some other exhibition, but he obtains but little attention, and the Gallery fades out of the list of amusements to be watched, until its legitimate and favourite occupants return.

In 1860 the Reeds were joined by John Parry, a former concert singer and subsequently an entertainer known for his impressions of popular performers. The historian Jane W. Stedman writes that the Reeds' playbills "settled into a format, which continued even after Parry retired in 1869: a musical monologue to piano accompaniment by Parry ... preceded and/or followed by a musical piece, later two, often farcical, often a pocket operetta".

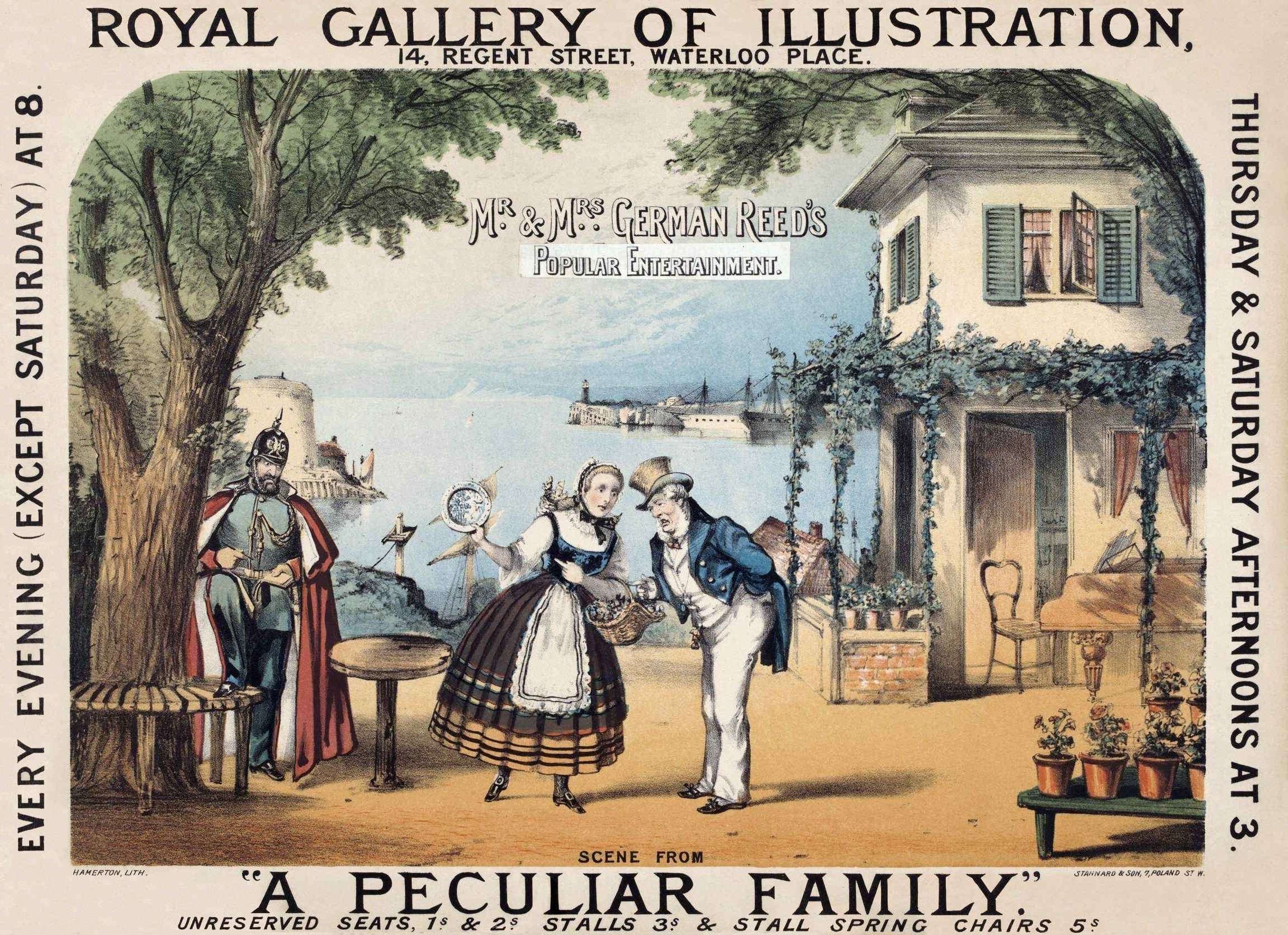
Poster for A Peculiar Family (1865) by William Brough

In the 1850s and 1860s theatres were regarded by a substantial part of society as not respectable. The historian Andrew Crowther writes, "Many who would gladly attend a concert, a lecture or an exhibition at a gallery would not think of setting foot in a theatre". The Reeds did not to refer to the Gallery of Illustration as a theatre, and they called their productions "illustrations" or "entertainments", acts were "parts", and roles were "assumptions", avoiding conventional theatrical terms. Stedman comments that the accompaniment of piano, harmonium, and at times a harp "also emphasized the presumably untheatrical nature of the entertainment". The author F. Anstey recalled that in his Victorian childhood there was no question of being taken to a theatre,

... but we were taken to the old Gallery of Illustrations, which was not considered a theatre, and very delightful it was. The auditorium was narrow and rather stuffy, the seats sloped in a steep rake down to the tiny stage. Gilbert, Burnand, and the à Becketts wrote the plays, which were not called plays but 'illustrations', so that the strictest could see them without offence.

The stage was tiny because the long, narrow gallery could not accommodate a larger one. This restricted the Reeds to a cast of at most five performers. (Note: Ages Ago, No Cards, Our Island Home, A Sensation Novel and Happy Arcadia all feature 5 actors. See, for example Nos. 14 and 15 of Ages Ago, where all five characters appear onstage together.) Much doubling of parts and quick changes were called for. The Era reported on a typical production in July 1868: (Note: The piece was Inquire Within by F. C. Burnand and music by Reed.)

Mrs German Reed personates successively a Scotch housekeeper, Mrs McCraggie; a flirting spinster, Miss Rougemel, with a capital "song about Cheltenham"; and the loquacious busy body Mrs Meddle. Mr German Reed makes a series of rapid changes as an enthusiastic flute-player named Chirriper, with the infirmity of deafness; a speech-making Deputy Lieutenant, Orpheus Rougemel, who sets his oration to music; the accepted lover, Lieutenant Robert Barton, RN; and a fussy elderly solicitor, called William Prynne, who discovers in Miss Rougemel an old sweetheart.

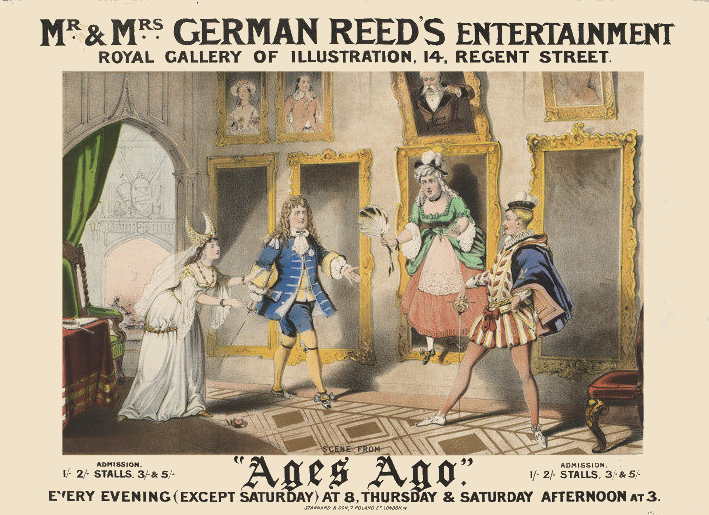
Ages Ago by W. S. Gilbert and Frederic Clay (1869), the gallery's most popular show

Reed experimented with what he called chamber opera – opera di camera – simplified versions of operas for his usual small forces. The first was Jessy Lea (1863), a retelling of L'elisir d'amore, with words by John Oxenford and music by George Macfarren. After seven further productions of the same nature, with original music by Macfarren and Virginia Gabriel and adaptations of Offenbach and Michael Balfe the experiment came to an end.

At the gallery the Reeds staged nine pieces by William Brough, (Note: The Brough works, with music composed or arranged by Reed, were Holly Lodge, and The Enraged Musician (both written with his brother Robert and staged by the Reeds at St Martin's Hall before being revived at the gallery) A Month From Home (1857), My Unfinished Opera (1857), Our Home Circuit 1859), Seaside Studies (1861), The Rival Composers (1861), The Bard and his Birthday (1864), and A Peculiar Family (1865).) seven by F. C. Burnand, (Note: Burnand's works given at the gallery were: Our Yachting Cruise (1866), Inquire Within, Cox and Box (1869, music by Arthur Sullivan), Beggar My Neighbour (1870, an adaptation of Offenbach's Les deux aveugles, My Aunt's Secret (1872, music by James Molloy), Very Catching (1872, music by Molloy) and Mildred's Well (1873, music by Reed).) and five by W. S. Gilbert, (Note: Gilbert's pieces for the gallery were No Cards (1869, music by Reed), Ages Ago (1869, music by Frederic Clay), Our Island Home (1870, music by Reed), A Sensation Novel (1871, music by Reed) and Happy Arcadia (1872, music by Clay).) whose Ages Ago (1869, with music by Frederic Clay) was the Reeds' longest-running and most frequently revived production, narrowly outdistancing Burnand and Arthur Sullivan's Cox and Box. Other authors whose works were presented there included Shirley Brooks, Henry Chorley, James Planché, Robert Reece, T. W. Robertson, Bolton Rowe and Tom Taylor. Among the composers in addition to Reed, Parry, Macfarren, Sullivan, Gabriel and Clay were Alfred Cellier and James Molloy.

The Reeds' lease of the gallery expired at the end of July 1873, and the building ceased to be used as a performance space. The programme for the last night there, on 31 July, comprised Mildred's Well; or A Romance of the Middle Ages by Burnand and Reed, Very Catching by Burnand and Molloy, and Our Garden Party by Corney Grain. The Reeds moved to St George's Hall at the opposite end of Regent Street; the gallery became the banqueting hall of the Pall Mall Restaurant, which occupied the site until 1883, when the building was leased by the new Constitutional Club.

== Legacy ==
The historical importance of the gallery is chiefly its role in the early careers and development of leading authors, composers and performers. Several future stars had their start in the Reeds' company, including Arthur Cecil, Corney Grain and Fanny Holland. Few of the shows presented at the gallery have remained in the repertory. Gilbert's Ages Ago has been revived occasionally. Burnand and Sullivan's Cox and Box was taken up by later managements including the D'Oyly Carte Opera Company, and has continued to be revived regularly in the 21st century.

== Posters ==
Some productions at the Gallery

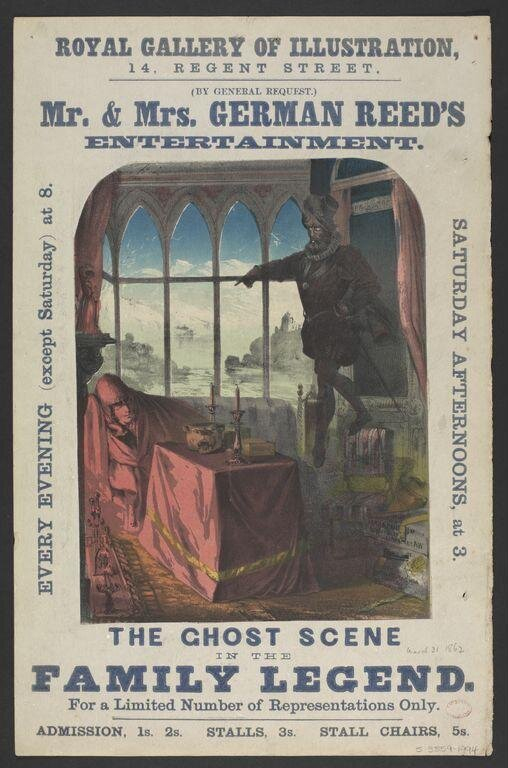
The Family Legend
Tom Taylor
(1862)

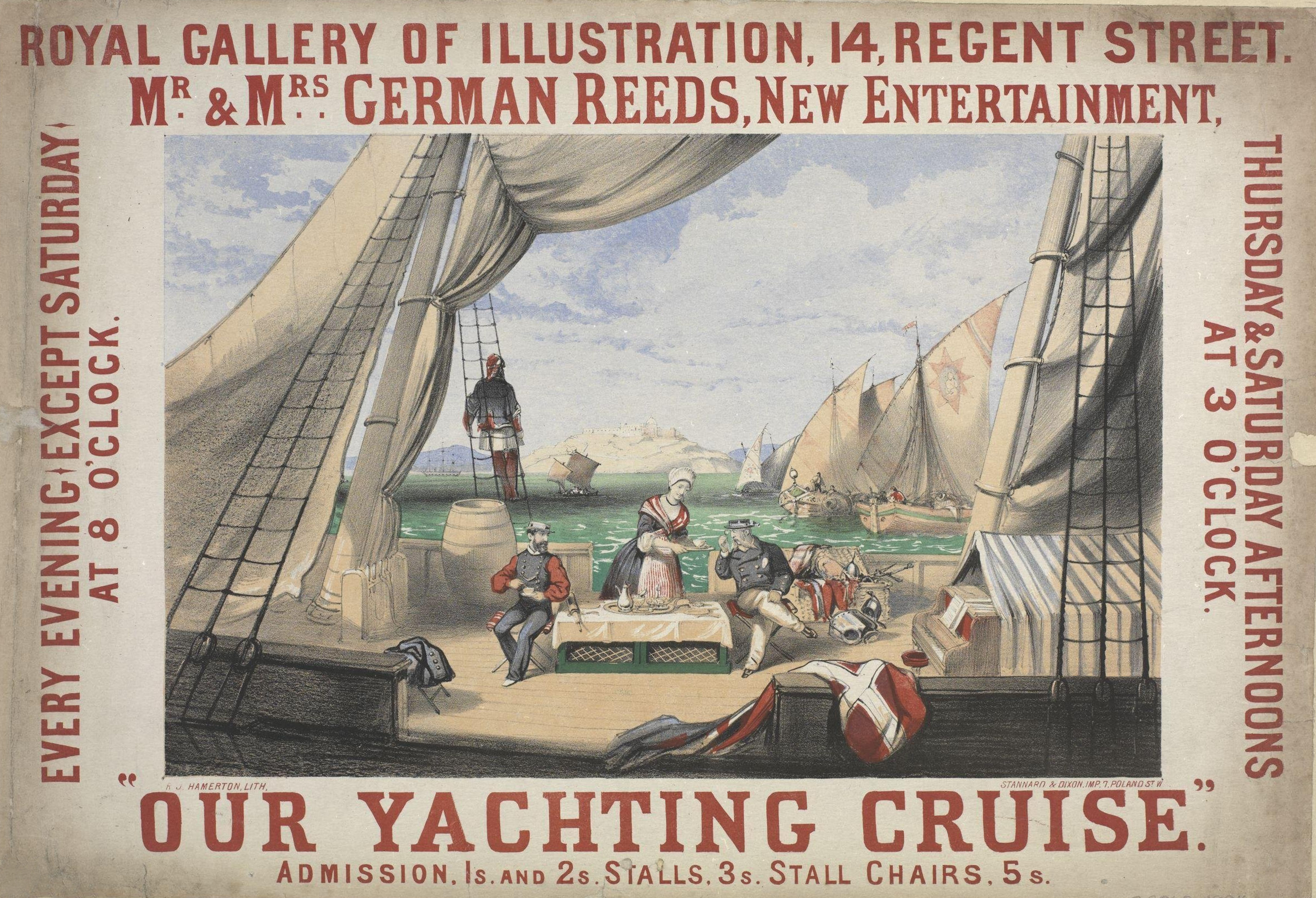
Our Yachting Cruise
F. C. Burnand
(1866)

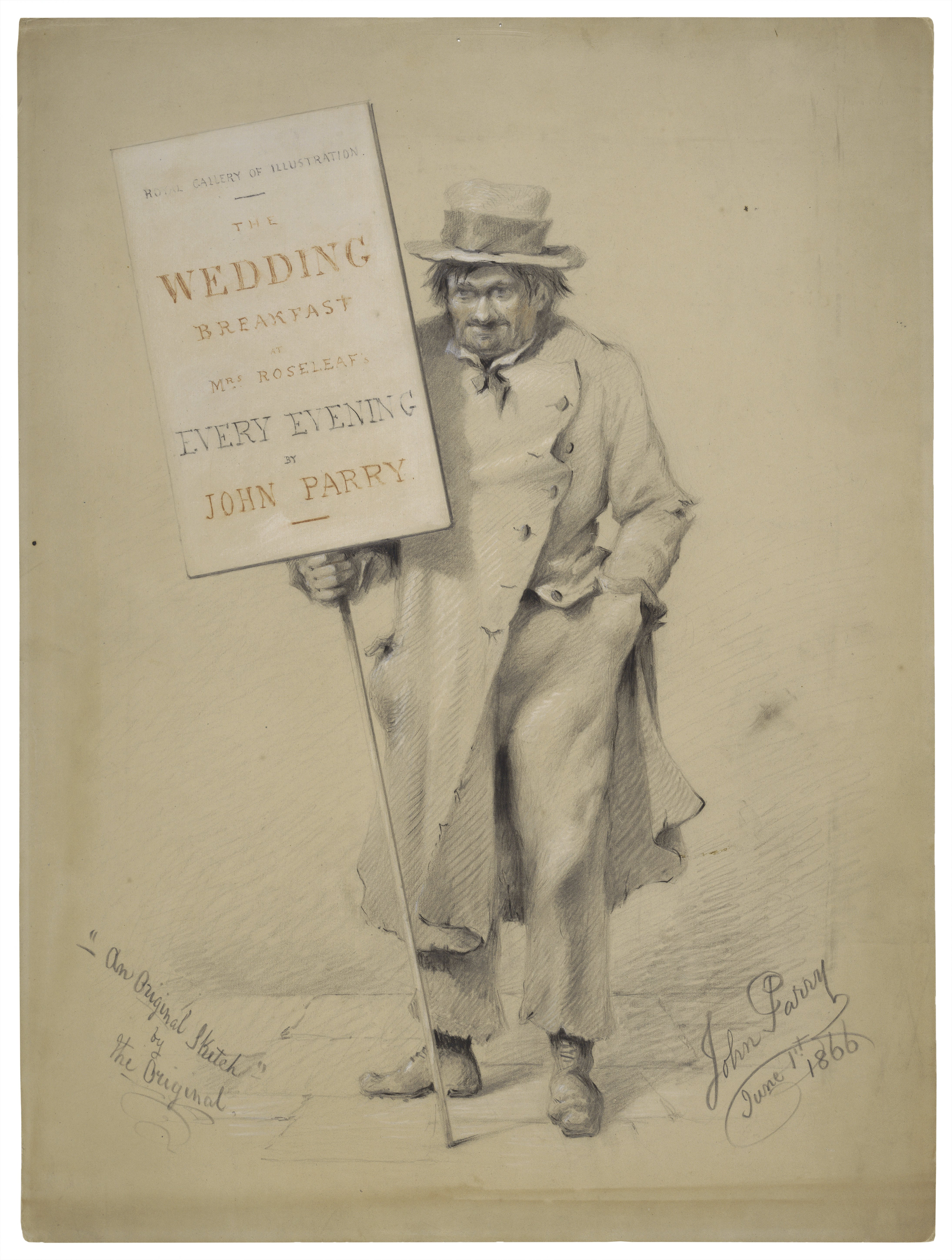
1866 advertisement by John Orlando Parry for his own entertainment, "The Wedding Breakfast at Mrs. Roseleaf's"

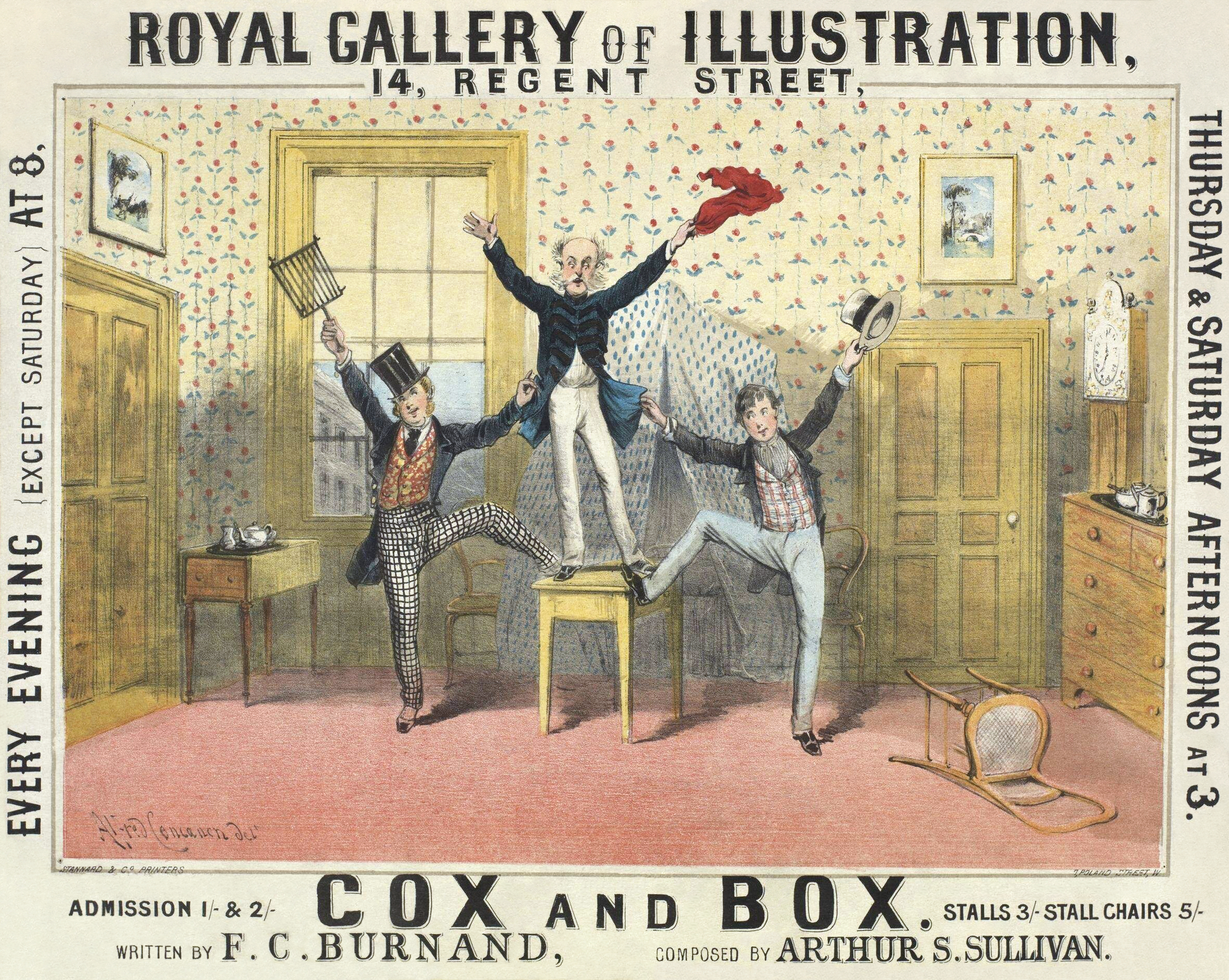
Cox and Box
Burnand and Arthur Sullivan
(1869)

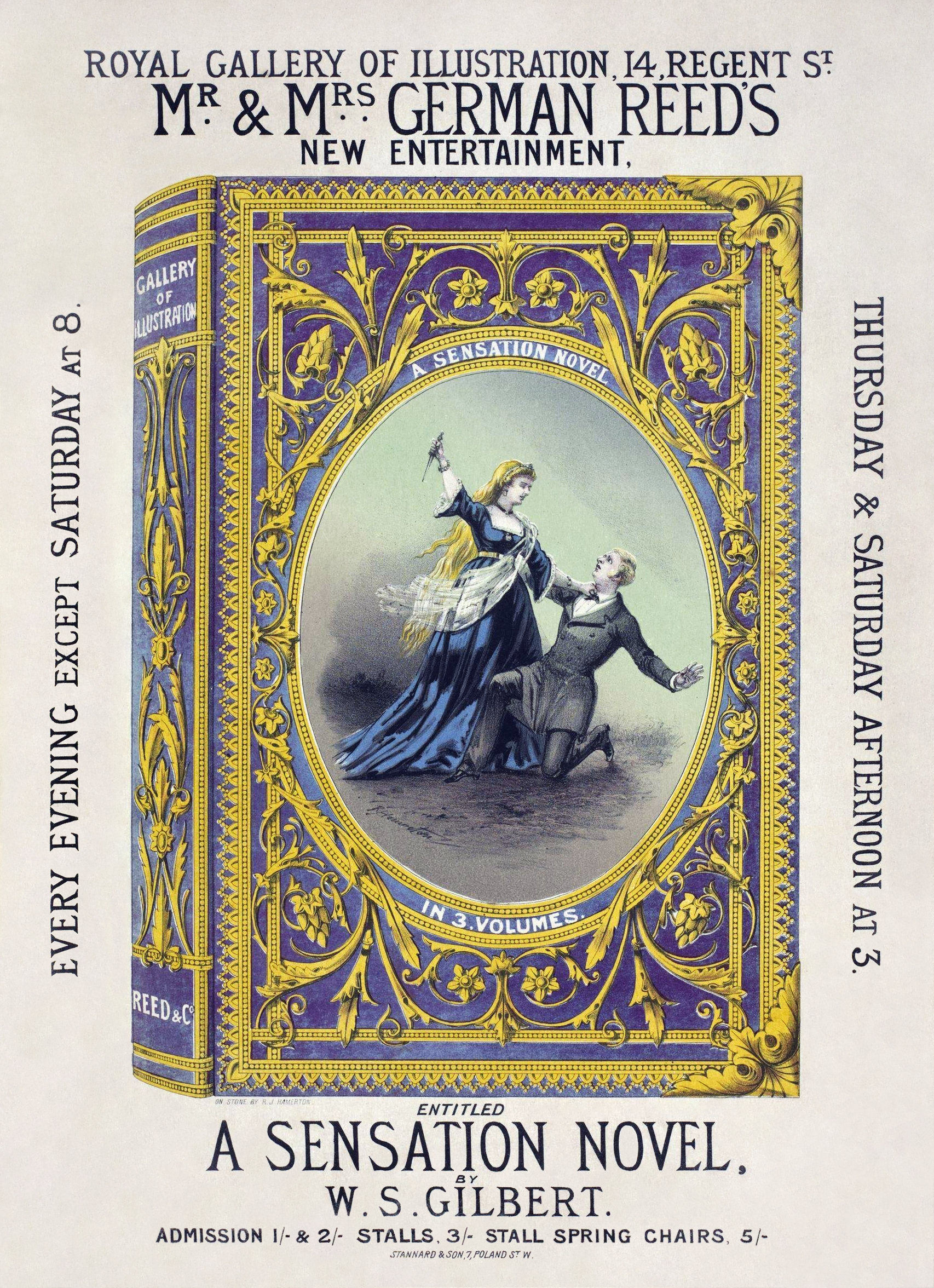
A Sensation Novel
W. S. Gilbert and
German Reed (1871)

== Notes, references and sources ==
=== Sources ===
- Anstey, F. (1936). A Long Retrospect. Oxford: Oxford University Press. OCLC 917214233.
- Crowther, Andrew (2011). Gilbert of Gilbert & Sullivan: His Life and Character. Stroud: The History Press. ISBN 978-0-7524-6385-8.
- Lubenow, William C. (2010). Liberal Intellectuals and Public Culture in Modern Britain, 1815–1914. Woodbridge: Boydell Press. ISBN 978-1-84383-559-2.
- Pugin, Augustus; John Britton (1838). Illustrations of the Public Buildings of London (second ed.). London: Weale. OCLC 664399053.
- Rollins, Cyril; R. John Witts (1962). The D'Oyly Carte Opera Company in Gilbert and Sullivan Operas: A Record of Productions, 1875–1961. London: Michael Joseph. OCLC 504581419.
- Summerson, John (1935). John Nash: Architect to King George IV. London: Allen & Unwin. OCLC 1150082194.
