= John Parry (harpist, born 1776) =

Welsh harpist & composer (1776–1851)

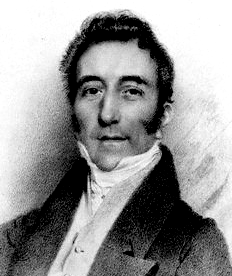

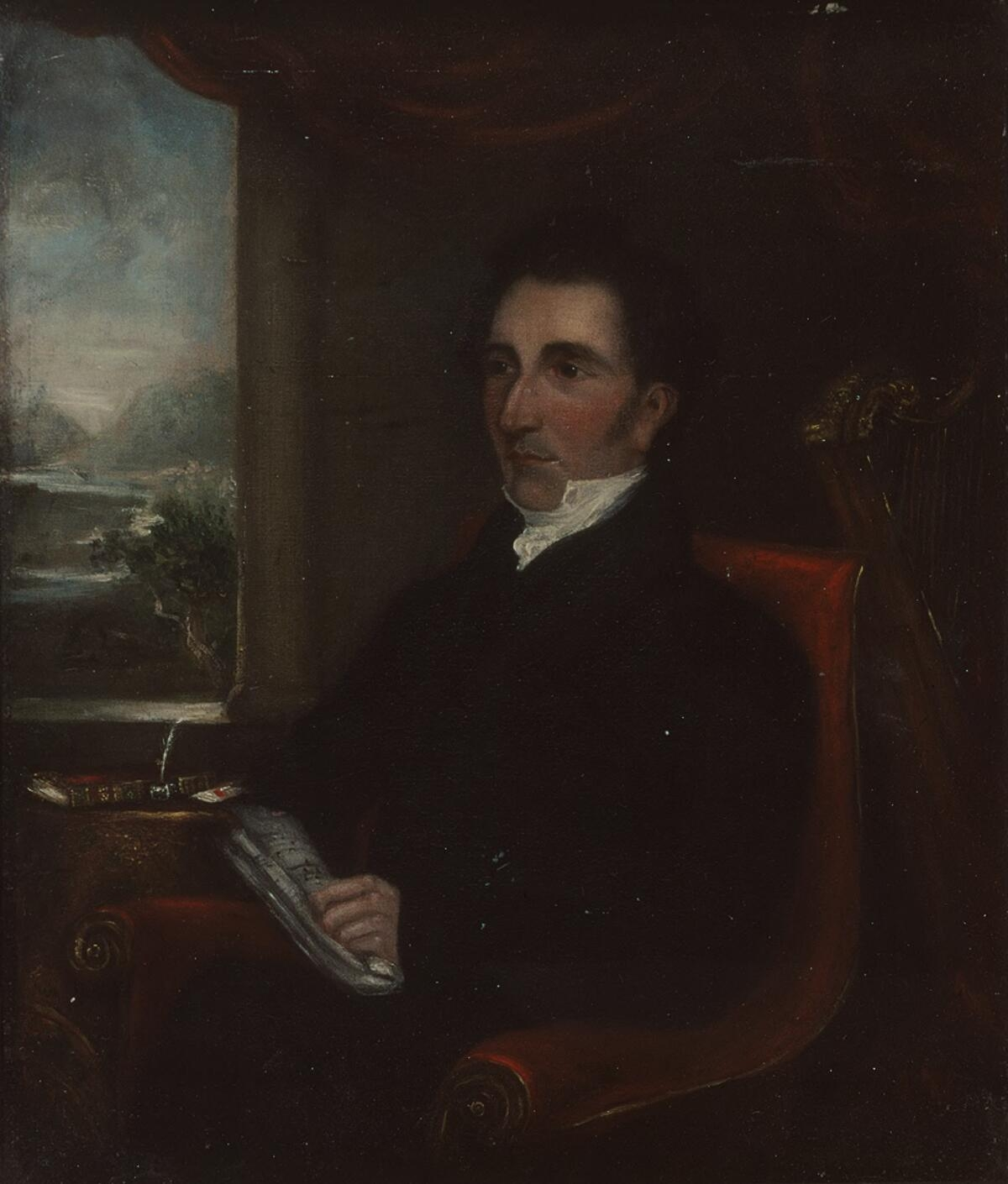

John Parry (18 February 1776 – 8 April 1851), commonly known by his bardic name Bardd Alaw, was a Welsh harpist and composer.

== Biography ==
Parry was born in Denbigh, in northern Wales, the son of a stonemason. He taught himself to play the fife on an instrument that he made himself from a piece of cane, and a dance-master who lived nearby taught him the rudiments of the clarinet, which he used to accompany singers in church.

In 1793, Parry joined the Denbighshire militia's volunteers' band, becoming its conductor in 1797. He became a master of the harp, the clarinet and the flageolet and learned to play many other instruments. In 1807, he left the band and settled in London, where his son, the entertainer John Orlando Parry, was born. At a concert at Covent Garden, in the same year, he performed on two flageolets set together in frame. It is thought that this inspired the flageolet-maker William Bainbridge to invent his double-flageolet. Parry subsequently became this instrument's most famous player, teacher and proponent. By 1809, he began to compose and publish vocal compositions, especially ballads, and simple pieces for the harp and piano, as well as duets for flute and other wind instruments. He also became a facile orchestrator. The same year, he was appointed musical director at Vauxhall Gardens and composed much of the music performed there.

Parry soon published a collection of Welsh melodies, for which the Cambrian Society presented him with a silver medal. He later composed two volumes of Ancient British Airs, with poetry by Mrs. Hemans. Between 1813 and 1818, he composed several songs for public occasions and songs for two musical farces, Fair Cheating and High Notions, writing both the words and music. The name "Bardd Alaw" (professor of music and master of song) was given him at the Welshpool eisteddfod, or Congress of Welsh Bards, at Wrexham in 1821, of which he was musical director. In the same year, he launched Cymdeithas y Canorion, to encourage singing to harp accompaniment. His associates included Lady Llanover, at whose house he was a guest, Felicia Hemans, with whom he collaborated, and Maria Jane Williams, who worked with him on The Welsh Harper. He organized many cymrodorions (Welsh folk festivals).

Also in 1821, he produced, at the English Opera, a successful piece called Two Wives, or a Hint to Husbands. In 1822, he conducted at the congress of the Welsh bards held at Brecon and the meetings of the Welsh bards, held in London, which continued for many years under his direction as registrar of music to the Royal Cambrian Institution. He also wrote parts of several operas and other pieces; adapted the music to an opera of Ivanhoe, performed at Covent Garden Theatre; and composed over three hundred songs, duets, and other pieces, especially for the harp, piano, flageolet, violin and flute, including almost every genre of music. Among other works, he published two volumes of Welsh melodies, with English words; two volumes of Scottish songs; two volumes of catches and glees; two of minstrel songs, for the flute, entitled Corydon and Sapphonia, for the violin. His works also include several volumes of military music; books of instruction for several instruments; two sets of Welsh airs; and The Æolian Harmonies, consisting of selections from the works of the most eminent composers, arranged for wind instruments.

On 24 May 1826, a benefit concert was held on Parry's behalf by the Society of Cymmrodorion, which he had served as its "Registrar of Music". During the 1830s and 1840s he was a regular adjudicator at eisteddfodau.

== Works ==
=== Written ===
- The Ancient Britons’ Martial Music (1804)
- Welsh Melodies (1809)
- An Account of the Rise and Progress of the Harp (1834)
- An Account of the Royal Musical Festival Held in Westminster Abbey in 1834 (1834)

=== Songs ===
- "Jenny Jones"
- "Oh, Let the Kind Minstrel"
- "Norah, the Pride of Kildare"

=== Airs ===
- "Gwenynen Gwent"
- "Ap Shencyn"
- "St. David's Day"

== Sources ==
- Welsh Biography Online
