= John Parry (actor) =

English actor and musician (1810–1879)

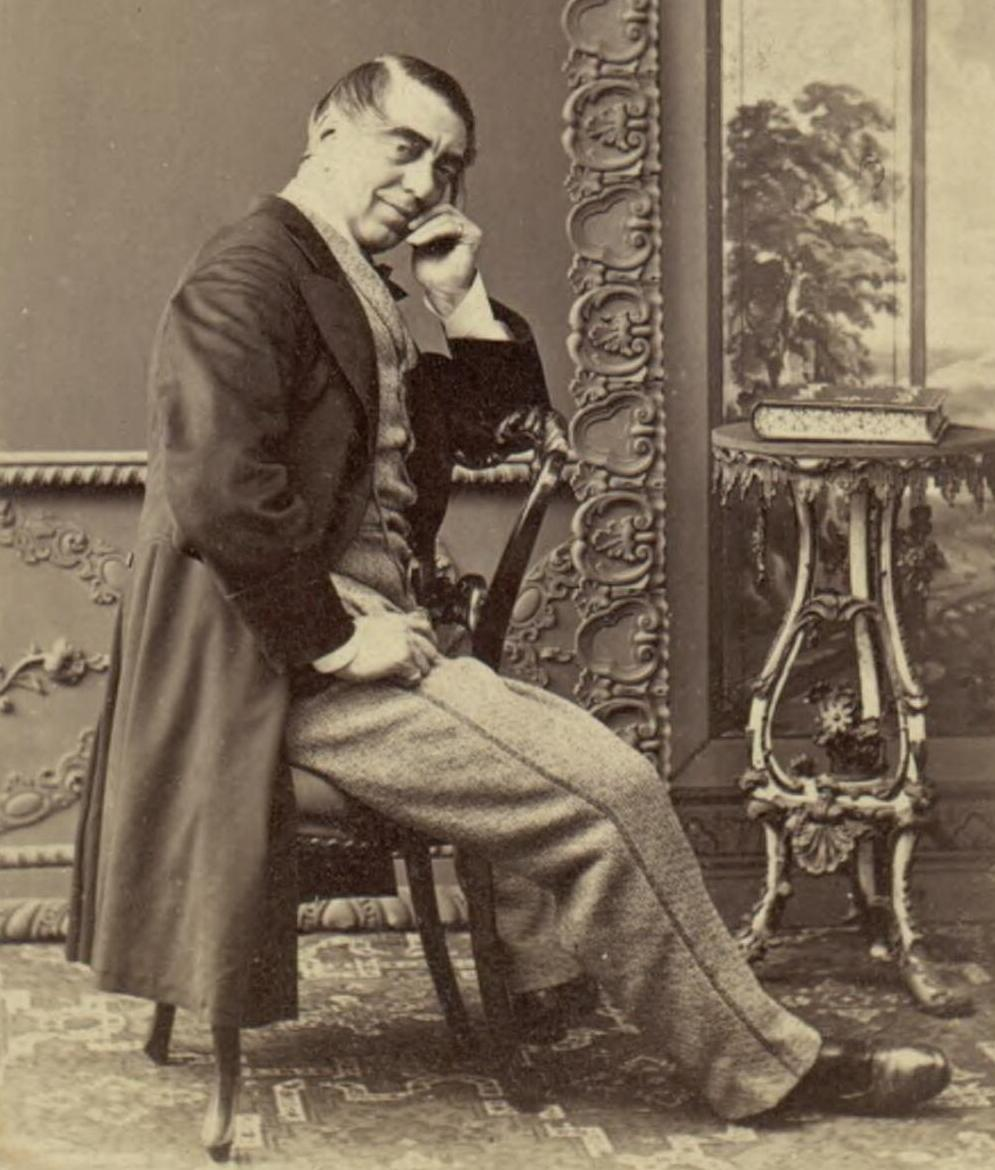
- Parry c. 1870
- Born: 3 January 1810; London, England
- Died: 20 February 1879 (aged 69); East Molesey, Surrey, England
- Occupations: actor, pianist and singer
- Spouse: Anne Combe (m. 1835)
- Children: Maria
- Parent: John Parry

John Orlando Parry (3 January 1810 – 20 February 1879) was an English actor, pianist, artist, comedian, songwriter and singer. As a child of a musician, he studied harp and piano and first performed on the harp in his teens. He began singing professionally in 1830 and both performed and studied singing in Italy in 1833. He also was employed as an illustrator and artist.

Parry returned to England and continued singing and playing. He married in 1835 and began performing in musical theatre in 1836. By 1839 he was becoming known as a comic singer and soon began composing for the stage. In the 1840s he focused on writing songs, concert singing and playing the piano. He later began performing his solo entertainments of comic monologues and songs, accompanying himself at the piano. In 1853, because of the strain of touring and performing, Parry suffered from mental derangement. While recovering, he worked as an organist in Southsea and taught singing.

In 1860, he joined the German Reed Entertainments in London, where he performed for nearly nine years in comic impersonations and musical monologues, writing comic sketches with musical illustrations around his own comic songs and accompanying himself.

== Biography ==
=== Early life and career ===
Parry, the only son of Welsh musician John Parry (known as Bardd Alaw), was born in London and, at an early age, was taught by his father to sing and to play the harp and the piano. He also studied the harp under Robert Bochsa. As Master Parry, in May 1825, he appeared as a performer on the harp. As a baritone vocalist he made his début on 7 May 1830 at the Hanover Square Rooms, in London, on the occasion of Franz Cramer's concert, when he sang Handel's Arm, arm, ye brave! with much success.

Parry was also an illustrator and artist.

After receiving lessons from Sir George Smart in sacred and classical music, he was in demand as a singer at the Antient and Philharmonic concerts, and also at musical festivals in town and country. For him Sigismund Neukomm composed Napoleon's Midnight Review, and several other songs, but his best efforts were in simple ballads. In 1833 he visited Italy, and received instruction from Luigi Lablache at Naples, where he resided some time. At Posilippo he gave a concert in a theatre belonging to impresario Domenico Barbaja, the second part of which comprised a burlesque on Othello, Lablache taking the part of Brabantio; Calvarola, the Liston of Naples, playing the Moor; and Parry as Desdemona, dressed à la Madame Vestris, and singing "Cherry Ripe". He also appeared before the king and queen of the Two Sicilies, and gave imitations of Lablache, Rubini, and Malibran in a mock Italian trio.

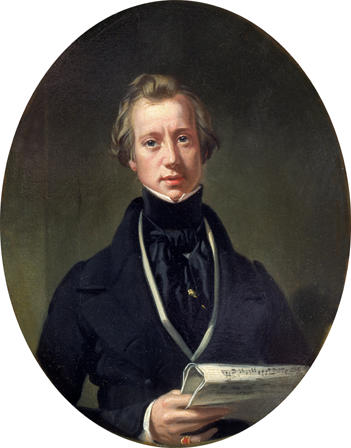
Portrait of Parry, c. 1840

He returned to England in 1834, after perfecting his command of the Italian language. On 28 May 1835 he performed in a state room at St James's Palace for King William IV, Queen Adelaide and other members of the royal family. He accompanied himself on the harp in Lord Burghersh's air "Bendermeer's Stream" and sang a duet with Adelaide Kemble. He married, on 30 June 1835, Anne Combe, the daughter of Henry Combe, a surgeon. They had a daughter, Maria. In July 1836 he gave his first benefit concert at the Hanover Square Rooms, when Malibran sang for him, and he joined her in Mazzinghi's duet When a little farm we keep. Persuaded to try the stage, he came out at the St. James's Theatre, just then built by his father's old friend, John Braham, on 29 September 1836, in a burletta called The Sham Prince, written and composed by his father. He was well received, and on 6 December in the same year he appeared in John Poole's Delicate Attentions, and in a burletta, The Village Coquettes, written by Charles Dickens, with music by John Hullah. Subsequently he was for a brief season at the Olympic Theatre. By 1839, Parry was becoming known as a comic singer, and in 1840 he composed a comic opera called Wanted, a Governess.

=== Concert room and German Reed entertainments ===
Humorous manual written and illustrated by Parry

In 1842 he forsook the stage for the concert-room, and was singing, with Anna Thillon and Josef Staudigl, in pieces written expressly for him by Albert Smith. Parry afterwards accompanied Camillo Sivori, Franz Liszt, Sigismund Thalberg, and others in a concert tour through the United Kingdom, and his powers as a pianist and his originality as a buffo vocalist were widely recognised. In 1849 Albert Smith wrote an entertainment entitled Notes Vocal and Instrumental, which Parry produced on 25 June 1850 at the Store Street Music Hall, Bedford Square, London, and illustrated with large water-colour paintings executed by himself. In it he indulged in monologue, sang in different voices, played the piano, and made rapid changes of his dress. The entertainment proved more acceptable to the audience than any single-handed performance since the time of Charles Mathews the elder. He was afterwards seen at Crosby Hall, Bishopsgate Street, at Willis's Rooms, King Street, St. James's, and in the provinces. On 17 August 1852 he brought out a new solo entertainment at Store Street, called The Portfolio for Children of all Ages, which he continued with much success until August 1853. The strain of this engagement, however, proved excessive, and for a time he suffered from mental derangement. When somewhat recovered, he became organist at St. Jude's Church, Southsea, and gave lessons in singing.

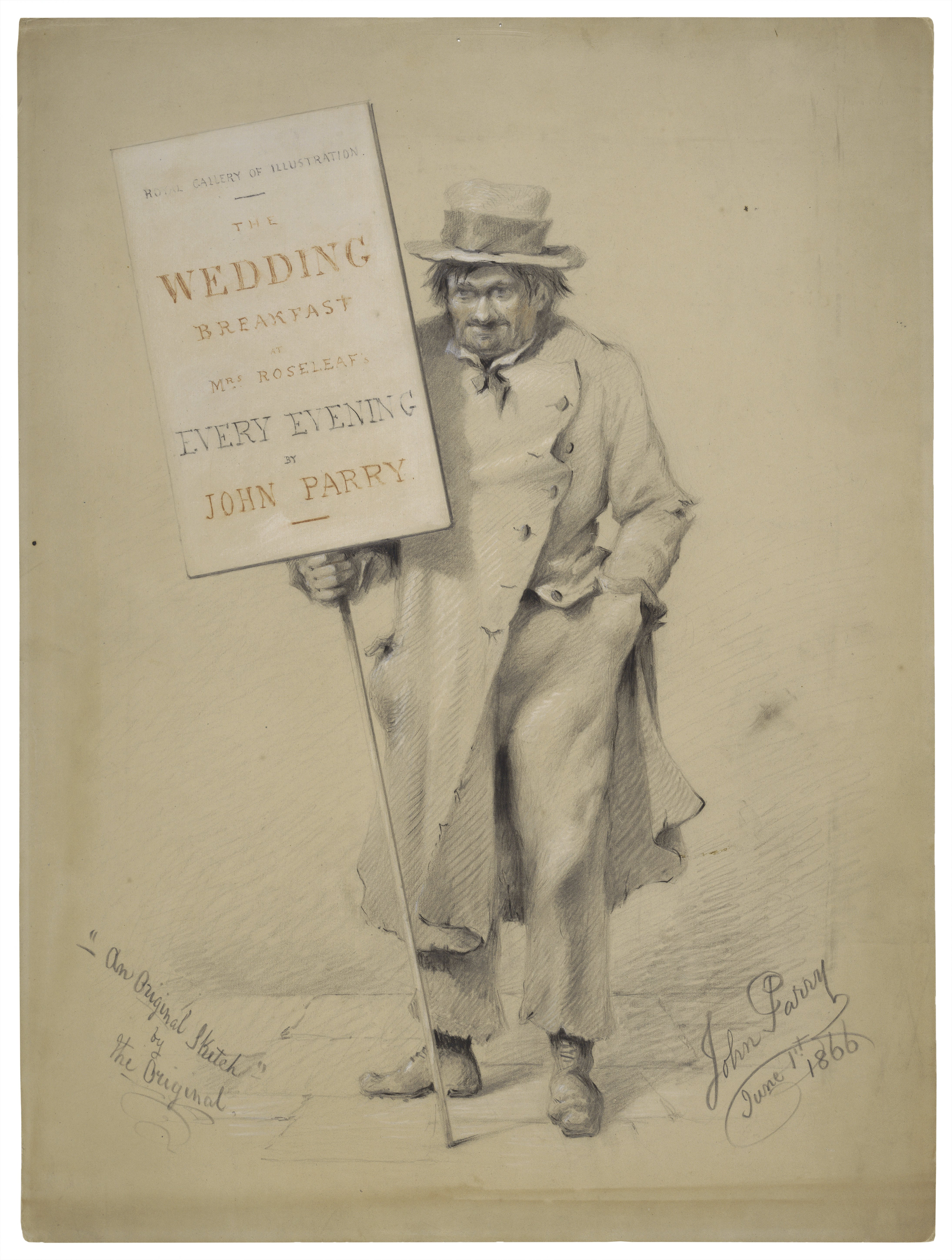
1866 ad, drawn by Parry, for The Wedding Breakfast at Mrs. Roseleaf's at the Royal Gallery of Illustration

On 4 June 1860, he joined Thomas German Reed and his wife at the Royal Gallery of Illustration, Regent Street, London. Here he performed for nearly nine years, presenting a series of droll impersonations and musical monologues that inspired other comedians, including George Grossmith. He built comic sketches with musical illustrations around his own comic songs. He wrote these entertainments, composed his own music, and played his own accompaniments.

=== Retirement ===
On 15 July 1869 a complimentary benefit was given to him by a distinguished party of amateurs at the Lyceum Theatre, and on 7 February 1877 he took a farewell benefit at the Gaiety Theatre, which realised £1,300. His later years were embittered by the loss in 1877, through the defalcations of his solicitor, of the greater part of his forty years' savings.

He died at the residence of his daughter, Pembroke Lodge, East Molesey, Surrey, at the age of 69; he was buried in East Molesey cemetery.

== Works ==
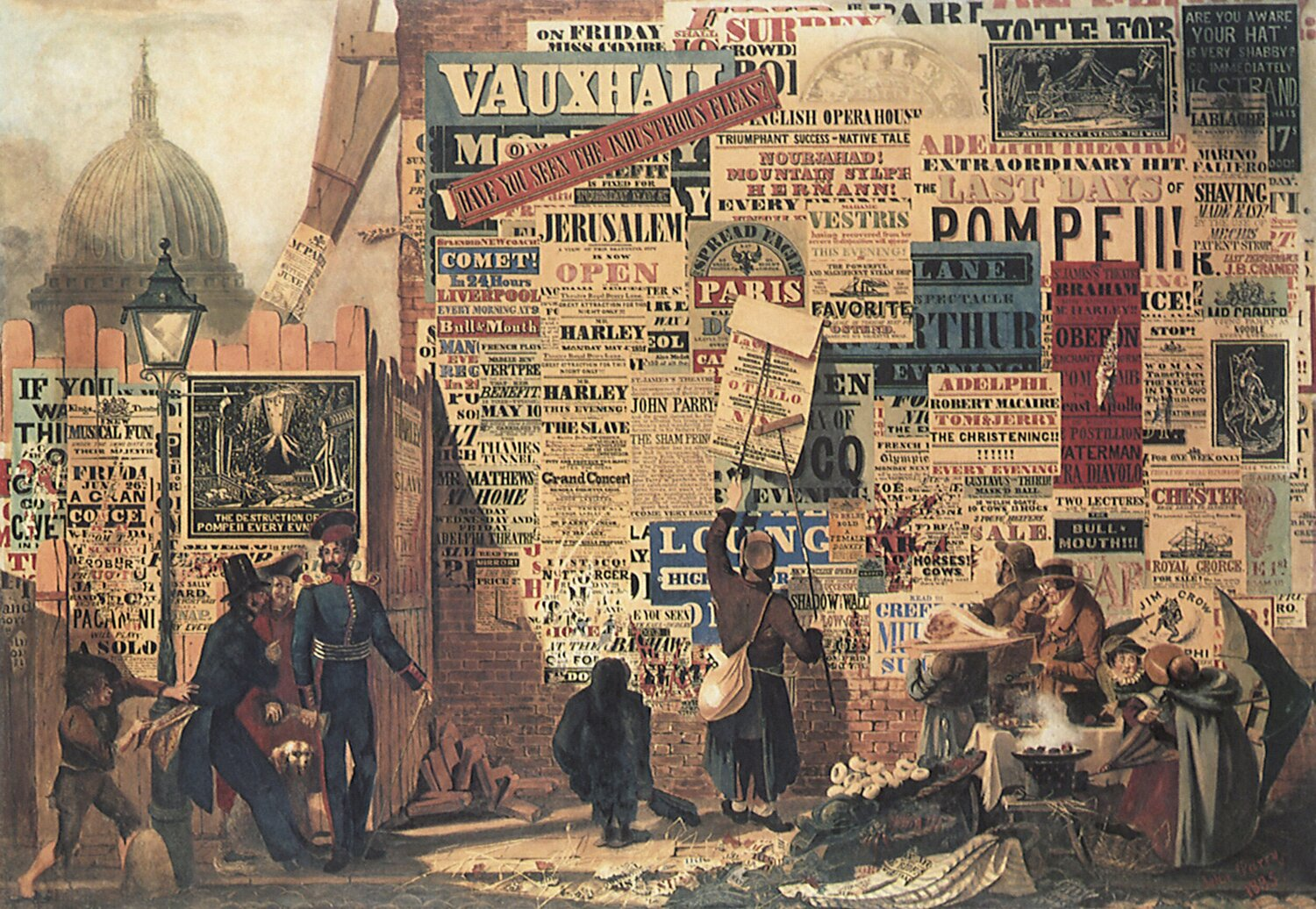
Parry watercolour, 1835

Parry was the composer of numerous songs and ballads, all of which he sang in his own entertainments. The following were printed: Wanted, a Governess (1840), Fair Daphne (1840), Anticipations of Switzerland (1842), The Accomplished Young Lady (1843), My déjeuner à la Fourchette (1844), The Polka explained (1844), Fayre Rosamond (1844), Matrimony (1845), Young England (1845), Miss Harriet and her Governess (1847), The Flying Dutchman (1848), Coralie (1853), Charming Chloe Cole (1854), Oh, send me not away from home (1854), Little Mary of the Dee (1855), In lonely bow'r bemoans the turtle dove (1855), The Tyrolese Fortune-teller (1867), Bridal Bells (1868), Cupid's Flight (1868), Don't be too particular (1868), Take a bumper and try (1874), and The Musical Wife (1878).

Duets: Fond Memory (1855), A B C (1863), Tell me, gentle stranger (1863), We are two roving minstrels (1864), and Flow, gentle Deva (1872). He also wrote the glees, Come, fairies, trip it on the grass (prior to 1851) and Oh! it is that her lov'd one's away (1853), and Parables set to Music, three numbers (1859), besides much music for the piano, including many polkas. The Melodists' Club awarded to Parry prizes for the following songs: The Inchcape Bell, The Flying Dutchman, A Heart to let, Sweet Mary mine, The Gipsy's Tambourine Song, Nant Gwynnant, You know, Constancy, Fair Daphne, and The Days of Yore. Some of his songs were arranged as quadrilles by L. Negri in 1842, and L. G. Jullien's Buffa Quadrilles in 1844 were also composed from the tunes of his vocal melodies.
