= Fanny Holland =

English singer and comic actress

- Portrait of Fanny Holland
- Born: 14 September 1847; London
- Died: 18 June 1931 (aged 83); Bournemouth, Dorset
- Occupations: Singer and comic actor
- Years active: 1869–1899
- Spouse: Arthur Law

Fanny Holland (14 September 1847 – 18 June 1931) was an English singer and comic actress primarily known as the creator of principal soprano roles in numerous German Reed Entertainments from 1869 to 1895.

Holland began her career as a concert singer. After a role in an operetta by Frederic Clay, she began to perform in the German Reed Entertainments in London, first in W. S. Gilbert and Clay's Ages Ago (1869). She eventually appeared in scores of German Reed productions, including four more by Gilbert, and in comic operas elsewhere, such as Gilbert's Topsyturveydom at the Criterion Theatre (1874), and with the D'Oyly Carte Opera Company at the Opera Comique, as Josephine in H.M.S. Pinafore from December 1879 to February 1880.

In 1877, she married actor-playwright Arthur Law, with whom she appeared with the German Reeds, sometimes in works written by her husband. She continued to perform with the German Reeds until 1895, when the company dissolved. She acted in Henry Arthur Jones's comedy The Manoeuvers of Jane at the Haymarket Theatre in 1898 to 1899.

== Life and career ==
Holland was born in London and studied there at the Royal Academy of Music. She was the daughter of John Holland and his wife Meriel Ann nee Marshall.

She gained success in London and the British provinces as a concert singer. The composer Frederic Clay asked her to perform in one of his operettas in Canterbury. In the piece, she introduced the song "She Wandered Down the Mountain Side", which became popular. Soon after that experience, Holland made her London stage debut with the German Reed Entertainments at the Gallery of Illustration, in November 1869, in the part of Rose in W. S. Gilbert and Clay's Ages Ago. Holland continued to appear with the German Reeds in scores of their productions. Among these were four more pieces by Gilbert: Our Island Home (1870), A Sensation Novel (1871), Happy Arcadia (1872), and Eyes and No Eyes (1875). She also starred in Dora's Dream, with music by Alfred Cellier and words by Arthur Cecil at the Gallery (1873). Holland also appeared at the Criterion Theatre in 1874 in Gilbert's Topsyturveydom, but the next year she was again performing with the German Reeds and continued to do so.

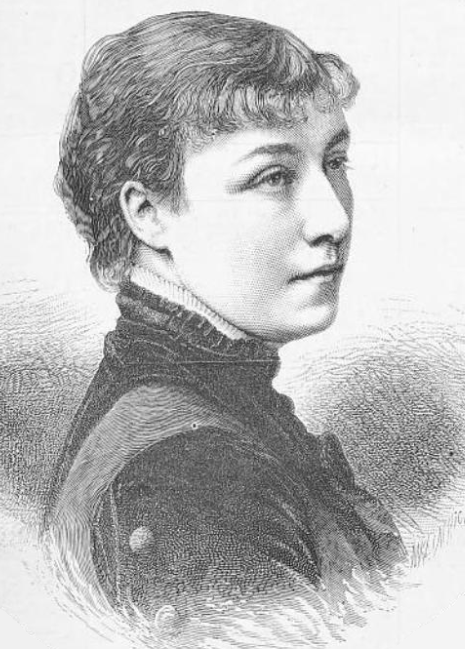
Fanny Holland before 1878

In 1877, she married actor-playwright Arthur Law, who wrote many works for the German Reeds and also acted in many of their pieces, sometimes with Holland. The couple had a son named Hamilton Patrick John Holland Law (born 1879). For most two years, from 1879 to 1881, Law and Holland performed on tour as "Mr. & Mrs. Arthur Law's Entertainment", but the venture proved unsuccessful. From December 1879 to February 1880 Holland performed with the D'Oyly Carte Opera Company at the Opera Comique, as Josephine in H.M.S. Pinafore, at the end of the run. In 1881, she returned to the German Reeds at their new theatre, St. George's Hall, where she performed until 1895.

At St. George's she played in entertainments too numerous to list. In 1877 alone, she appeared in A Night Surprise by her husband, who wrote under the pseudonym, "West Cromer"; Number 204 by F. C. Burnand, with music by Mr. German Reed; A Happy Bungalow, by Law, with music by King Hall; Once in a Century by Gilbert Arthur à Beckett, with music by Vivian Bligh; and Our New Doll’s House by W. Wye, with music by Cotsford Dick. Among many other works by her husband, she played in his 1882 play Nobody's Fault.

In 1895, the entertainments were discontinued after the deaths of the German Reeds' son, Alfred German Reed, and his partner Corney Grain. One of Holland's last appearances in the entertainments was in an 1895 revival of Happy Arcadia, managed by Rutland Barrington. in 1898 to 1899 she appeared in the comedy The Manoeuvers of Jane by Henry Arthur Jones at the Haymarket Theatre.

Holland died in Bournemouth at the age of 83.
