= A Sensation Novel =

Comic musical play by W. S. Gilbert

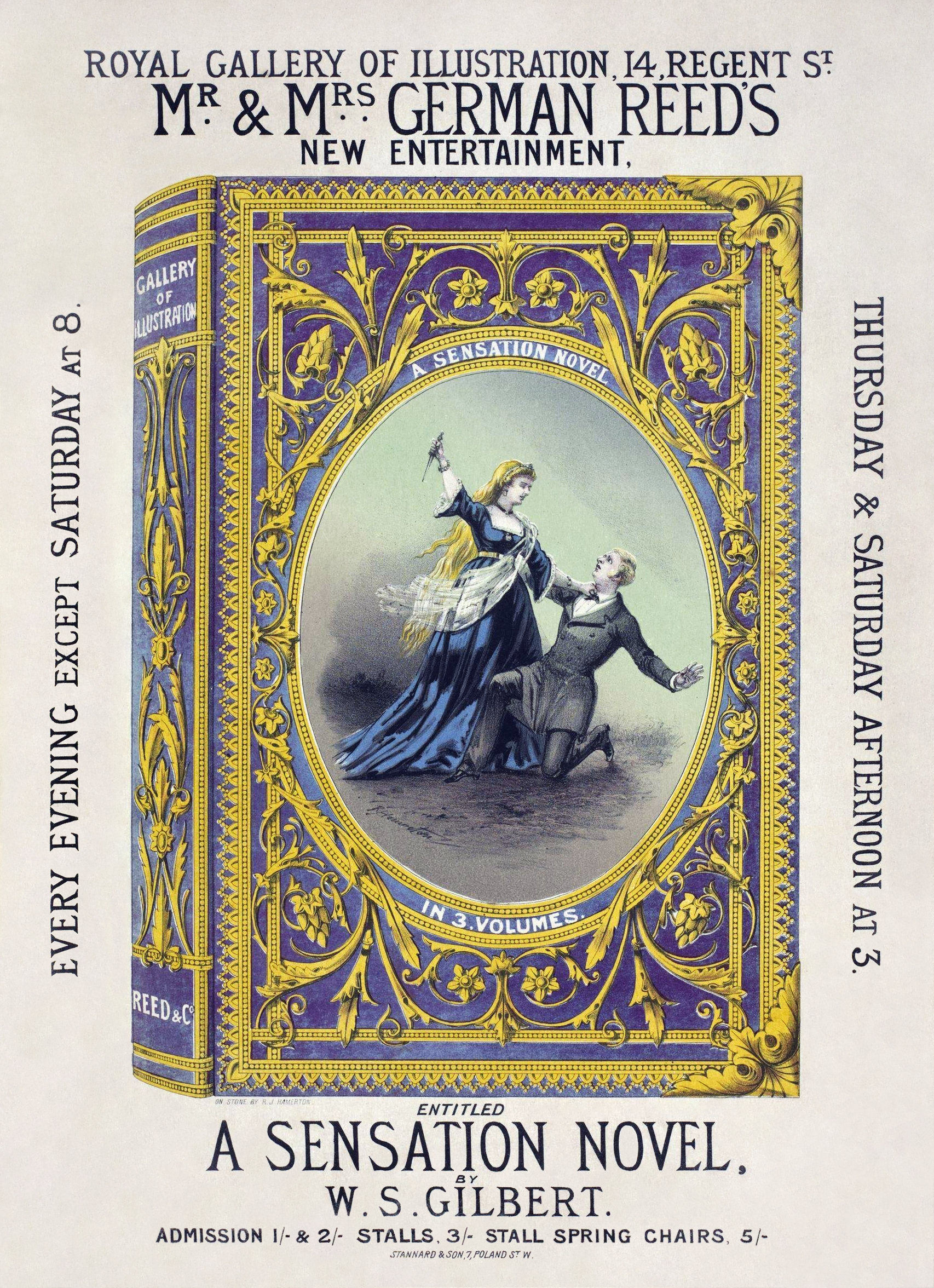
Poster by Robert Jacob Hamerton for the original 1871 production

A Sensation Novel is a comic musical play in three acts (or volumes) written by the dramatist W. S. Gilbert, with music composed by Thomas German Reed. It was first performed on 31 January 1871 at the Royal Gallery of Illustration. Only four of German Reed's songs survive. Nearly 25 years later, the music was rewritten and published by Florian Pascal (Joseph Williams, Jr). The story concerns an author suffering from writer's block who finds that the characters in his novel are dissatisfied.

The piece satirises the sensation novels popular as pulp detective fiction in the Victorian era. Later in his career, when Gilbert wrote the famous series of Savoy operas with Arthur Sullivan, he reused elements of A Sensation Novel in their comic opera Ruddigore.

== Background ==
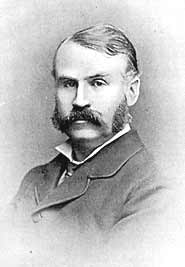
W.S. Gilbert in about 1870

A Sensation Novel is the fourth in a series of six short musical entertainments written by Gilbert for Thomas German Reed and his wife Priscilla between 1869 and 1875. The German Reeds presented respectable, family-friendly musical entertainments at their Gallery of Illustration beginning in 1855, at a time when the theatre in Britain had gained a poor reputation as an unsavoury institution and was not attended by much of the middle class. Shakespeare was played, but most of the entertainments available in theatres consisted of poorly translated French operettas, risqué burlesques and incomprehensible broad farces. The Gallery of Illustration was a 500-seat theatre with a small stage that only allowed for four or five characters with accompaniment by a piano, harmonium and sometimes a harp. Pascal's new score, written nearly 25 years later, sounds like early Debussy, out of period for this 1871 work.

A Sensation Novel satirises the sensation novels popular as pulp detective fiction in the Victorian era. The play concerns stock melodrama characters who take on a life of their own and comment negatively on the absurd plot their author forces them into. Music is a continual and essential element of the dramatic action throughout the piece. As scholar Jane W. Stedman observes in her book Gilbert Before Sullivan, this play anticipates Luigi Pirandello's Six Characters in Search of an Author. Fans of Gilbert and Sullivan will notice that Sir Ruthven Glenaloon prefigures Sir Ruthven Murgatroyd, Baronet of Ruddigore; Alice Grey, the virtuous heroine, is a foundling like Rose Maybud in Ruddigore; and that other elements of the piece anticipate the Savoy Operas, including babies switched at birth and a self-decapitation. Gilbert's casting of the large, ungainly Richard Corney Grain as the "spirit of romance" was a joke that foreshadowed his casting of the rather large Rutland Barrington as the image of perfect manly beauty in Patience.

Like some of Gilbert's other pieces for German Reed, most of the original score of A Sensation Novel is lost – four songs survive – although there have been re-settings by other composers. One such re-setting by Mike Nash was produced in 1998 at The International Gilbert and Sullivan Festival in Buxton, England, in 2015 in Baltimore, Maryland, United States, and in 2017 at the Edinburgh Festival Fringe.

== Roles and original cast ==
- Author/Sir Ruthven Glenaloon (baritone) – Thomas German Reed
- The Spirit of Romance/Gripper (bass) – R. Corney Grain
- Herbert de Browne (tenor) – Arthur Cecil
- Alice Grey (soprano) – Fanny Holland
- Lady Rockalda (contralto) – Priscilla German Reed

== Synopsis ==
=== Act I ===
Arthur Cecil as Herbert de Browne

In the first "volume", an author of sensation novels, despite having entered into a supernatural contract with the Spirit of Romance, is suffering from writer's block. Frustrated, he summons the Spirit, who informs him that the five characters he is using – the mild-mannered hero, the pure heroine, the villain and villainess, and the detective – are possessions that the Spirit has merely lent to him, and that they have lives of their own outside the text. The Spirit explains that the characters are all sinners who, as punishment for the crimes of their lives, must spend eternity playing a character that is the exact opposite to their true selves. Upon learning that his characters will come to life at the end of the first and second volume of his book, and before the final chapter of the third, the author, nervously reflecting that he has just finished the first volume, leaves his home before they appear, claiming to have an important meeting he had suddenly remembered.

When the characters appear, they are different from how they are portrayed in the novel. Lady Rockalda, who loves the hero in the novel, is a tired mother of five sons outside it. Sir Ruthven, portrayed as a villain in the novel, is actually kind and shy. Herbert, described as a noble hero in the novel, has a different lifestyle outside it. The characters' relationships also change. Herbert dislikes Rockalda in the novel but loves her outside it, while Alice Grey dislikes Sir Ruthven in the novel but loves him outside it. Outside the novel, Alice and Herbert dislike each other.

While they are in the novel, the characters are all miserable. Only during the few hours they get each night, free from the constraints of the authors' will, can they find even a little happiness. Therefore, they plot to work out how to prolong their time together and how to thwart the authors' schemes. The characters ridicule the trite, foolish and stuffy scenes they are forced to perform as part of the novel. Soon they are joined by Gripper, the novel's useless detective, who apologises for arriving late. He explains, however, that it is part of his job to be forever late – if he caught villains and stopped evil plots in a timely manner, no sensation novel would advance past the first volume. The characters realise that if Gripper were ever to be on time, their novel would be forced into its "happy" conclusion, with Alice and Herbert's marriage, a prospect that horrifies them all. Soon after this realisation, their time is up and they must return to their script.

=== Act II ===
The characters reassemble in Act II, the second volume. Herbert has been sent by the author to Central Africa for almost the whole remainder of the book, since he was "getting so confoundedly insipid no reader could stand [him]." Thus far, however, Herbert and Alice's marriage has been delayed, since Ruthven stopped the train that was to have taken her to Africa with him. The convoluted plot that they are enmeshed in seems to indicate that Alice is the rightful daughter of a Duke, whose place was deviously stolen by Rockalda, but Ruthven thinks she may actually be his long-lost granddaughter – which would be quite disappointing, as it would end any hope of their marriage. Rockalda and Alice get into an argument about who is really the Duke's daughter, but they are interrupted by Gripper's late appearance. He tells the assembled characters that he believes himself to be Ruthven's long-lost granddaughter. Their time is soon up, and they reluctantly return to their book.

=== Act III ===
At the start of Act III, which takes place just before the final chapter of the third volume, Herbert and Alice both enter, both in wedding dress and both depressed about what seems to be their inevitable end. Rockalda also comes to meet them, but Ruthven is nowhere to be found. Reading the manuscript, the characters discover that Ruthven has decapitated himself. They angrily call the author and inform him that they will rebel until he brings Ruthven back, and for good measure demand that he marry them to the characters they actually love. The author at first protests that it is impossible, but eventually gives in. Gripper rushes in, late as always, and refuses to be Sir Ruthven's granddaughter. The author, bullied into submission, agrees to bring Ruthven back, marry him to Alice, allow Herbert and Rockalda to marry, and reveal Gripper to be Sherlock Holmes in disguise. All ends happily.

Note on the Ending: This synopsis is based on the version of the libretto published in Jane W. Stedman's Gilbert Before Sullivan. Since Sherlock Holmes had not yet appeared in print in 1871, this ending must have been introduced in a later re-printing of the text. Stedman states that she relied on a 1912 edition of the libretto (Stedman, p. 229), and she does not report how the original version ended.

== Musical numbers ==
- 1. Music for curtain

=== Act I ===
- 2. "Take of best quill pens a score" (Author)
- 3a. "In half a minute they'll be here!" (Spirit and Author)
- 3b. Melodrame
- 4. "Like a motherly old lady" (Lady Rockalda)
- 5. Melodrame (enter Ruthven)
- 6a. Melodrame (enter Herbert)
- 6b. Melodrame (enter Alice)
- 7. "Goodness gracious!" (Lady Rockalda, Alice, Sir Ruthven, Herbert)
- 8. Melodrame (enter Gripper)
- 9. "Increase my woes" (Ensemble)

=== Act II ===
- 10. Introduction, melodrame (enter Lady Rockalda and Sir Ruthven)
- 11a. "No father's care, that I'm aware"* (Alice)
- 11b. "Well, once upon a time" (Sir Ruthven)
- 11c. Melodrame (enter Lady Rockalda)
- 12a. "With rage infuriate I burn!"* (Alice and Lady Rockalda)
- 12b. Melodrame (enter Gripper)
- 13. "When information I receive that Jones has been a-forging"* (Gripper)
- 14. "We must depart, our masters call us" (Ensemble)

=== Act III ===
- 15a. Introduction (enter Herbert)
- 15b. "Oh, agony! and oh, despair!"* (Herbert)
- 16. Melodrame (enter Rockalda)
- 17. Melodrame (enter Gripper)
- 18. "I'm delighted; I'm delighted" (Ensemble)

The songs for which settings composed by German Reed still survive are marked with an asterisk (*).
