= Thomas German Reed =

English actor-manager, musical director and singer (1817–1888)

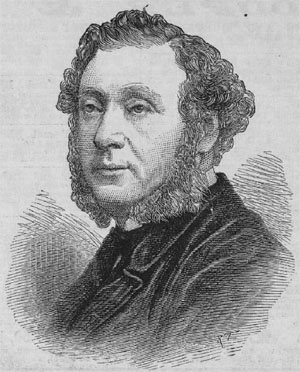
German Reed

Thomas German Reed (27 June 1817 – 21 March 1888), known after 1844 as simply German Reed was an English actor-manager, composer, musical director and singer of the Victorian era. He was best known for creating the German Reed Entertainments, together with his actress wife, a genre of musical plays that made theatre-going respectable at a time when the stage was considered disreputable.

While acting as organist and chapel-master at chapels in London, and also as musical director and performer at West End theatres in the 1830s and 1840s, Reed tried his hand at producing opera. He married Priscilla Horton, a noted singer, actress and dancer, in 1844. By 1851, he was managing opera productions at various theatres in London and on tour. In 1855, Reed and his wife began to present and perform in "Mr. and Mrs. German Reed's Entertainments", consisting of brief, small-scale, family-friendly comic operas. In the early and mid-Victorian era, the respectable middle classes regarded the theatre in general as sinful. Therefore, the Reeds shrewdly called their establishment the "Gallery of Illustration" and their productions "entertainments" to emphasize their refined propriety.

In addition to comic classics like The Beggar's Opera, the Reeds usually presented new works by English writers such as F. C. Burnand, W. S. Gilbert, William Brough and Gilbert à Beckett. His composers included Frederic Clay, Arthur Sullivan, George Macfarren and Alfred Cellier, as well as himself. Reed retired in 1871 after an injury, and his son Alfred took over the entertainments with his mother.

== Life and career ==
Reed was born in Bristol, the son of Thomas Reed (1795–1871), a musician, and his wife, Frances, née German (1796–1839). He studied music with his father and made his debut at the age of ten as a pianist and singer at the Bath Theatre. The family moved to London where Thomas Reed was appointed conductor at the Haymarket Theatre. The young Reed played, sang and acted at the theatre. In 1832, German Reed became an organist at the Roman Catholic Chapel in Sloane Street and assistant to his father, who moved to be conductor at the Garrick Theatre. His work at the theatre included scoring and adapting new operas, including Fra Diavolo in 1837. He also gave private music lessons.

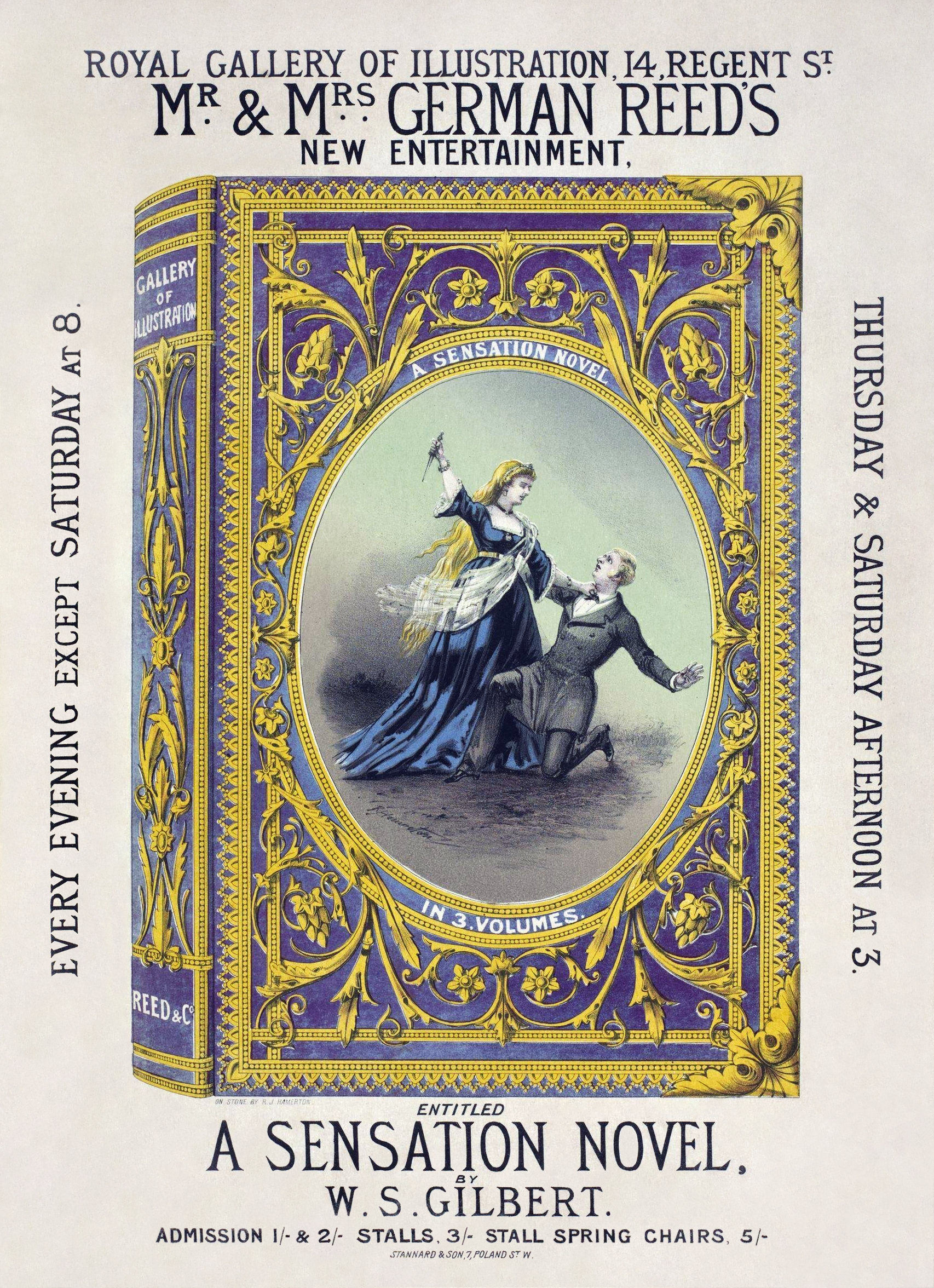
Poster for German Reed and W. S. Gilbert's A Sensation Novel, 1871

In 1838, Reed was appointed chapel-master at the Royal Bavarian Chapel and also became musical director at his father's former employer, the Haymarket Theatre, where he continued to work until 1851 with the exception of a temporary closure in 1843, during which he produced Pacini's opera Sappho at the Theatre Royal, Drury Lane. During these years, he met Priscilla Horton, a successful and popular contralto and actress who had been performing on the stage in London since the age of ten. They married in 1844. By that year he had dropped his first name. In 1851, Reed was engaged to assist in the production of opera at the Surrey Theatre and later managed Sadler's Wells Opera for a season and also conducted the music at the Olympic Theatre, as well as touring extensively in the British provinces.

In the spring of 1855, at St. Martin's Hall, Reed and his wife presented the first performance of "Miss P. Horton's Illustrative Gatherings". These performances usually consisted of one or two brief comic operas designed for a minimal number of characters and performed with either the piano and harmonium or a small ensemble of musicians. They eventually became "Mr. and Mrs. German Reed's Entertainments", presented at the Royal Gallery of Illustration in Regent Street, beginning in 1856, and later at St. George's Hall. At a time when the respectable middle classes regarded the theatre in general as sinful and even dangerous places of naughty humour, alcohol and prostitution, the Reeds called their establishment the "Gallery" of Illustration, rather than a "theatre", and their productions "entertainments" or "illustrative gatherings", rather than plays, extravaganzas, or burlesques. The Times characterised the works as "extravaganza of the more refined order." Reed and his wife almost always appeared in these pieces, and on the few occasions when they did not, the box-office receipts suffered.

Reed (in top hat) with his wife and John Parry and Susan Galton in A Dream in Venice at the Royal Gallery of Illustration, April 1867

Reed became the lessee of St. George's Hall in 1867, and there he initially produced and conducted The Contrabandista by Arthur Sullivan and F. C. Burnand, The Beggar's Opera and other English operas in small-scale productions, as well as non-musical plays. Around the same time, at the Gallery of Illustration, he presented works with libretti by, among others, W. S. Gilbert, William Brough, Gilbert à Beckett, Robert Reece and Arthur Law. His composers included Frederic Clay, George Macfarren, Alfred Cellier and Hamilton Clarke as well as Sullivan and Reed himself. He wrote the scores for more than a dozen of the entertainments, and is described by the museum curator Fredric Woodbridge Wilson as "an imaginative and effective writer of music for the stage". Little of Reed's music survives. A few individual songs were published, but the scores of the entertainments were not. The autograph of the music for Our Island Home is preserved in The Morgan Library & Museum, New York, but no other scores are known to be extant.

When the lease on the Gallery of Illustration ended in 1873, the German Reed entertainments moved to St. George's Hall. After falling from his horse when hunting, Reed had retired in 1871; his son Alfred (1847–1895) took over the entertainments with his mother, continuing with the entertainments after her retirement in 1879, until 1895.

Reed died at St Croix, Upper East Sheen, Surrey at the age of 70. He was buried in Old Mortlake Burial Ground.

== Works composed by German Reed ==
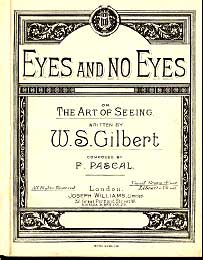
Cover of vocal score of Eyes and No Eyes

- The Drama at Home, or An Evening with Puff (1844)
- A Match for the King (1844)
- The Golden Fleece, or Jason in Colchis and Medea in Corinth (1845)
- Who's the Composer? (1845)
- The Wonderful Water Cure (1846)
- No Cards (1869, libretto by W. S. Gilbert)
- Our Island Home (1870, libretto by W. S. Gilbert)
- A Sensation Novel (1871, libretto by W. S. Gilbert)
- Mildred's Well, a Romance of the Middle Ages (1873)
- He's Coming (Via Slumborough, Snoozleton & Snoreham) (1874)
- The Three Tenants (1874)
- The Ancient Britons (1875)
- Eyes and No Eyes; or, The Art of Seeing (1875, libretto by W. S. Gilbert)
- Enchantment (libretto by Arthur Law)
- A Spanish Bond (1875)
- An Indian Puzzle (1876)
- The Wicked Duke (1876)
- Matched and Mated (1876)
- A Night's Surprise (1877)
- No. 204 (1877, libretto by F. C. Burnand)
