= Priscilla Horton =

English singer, actress and theatre manager (1818–1895)

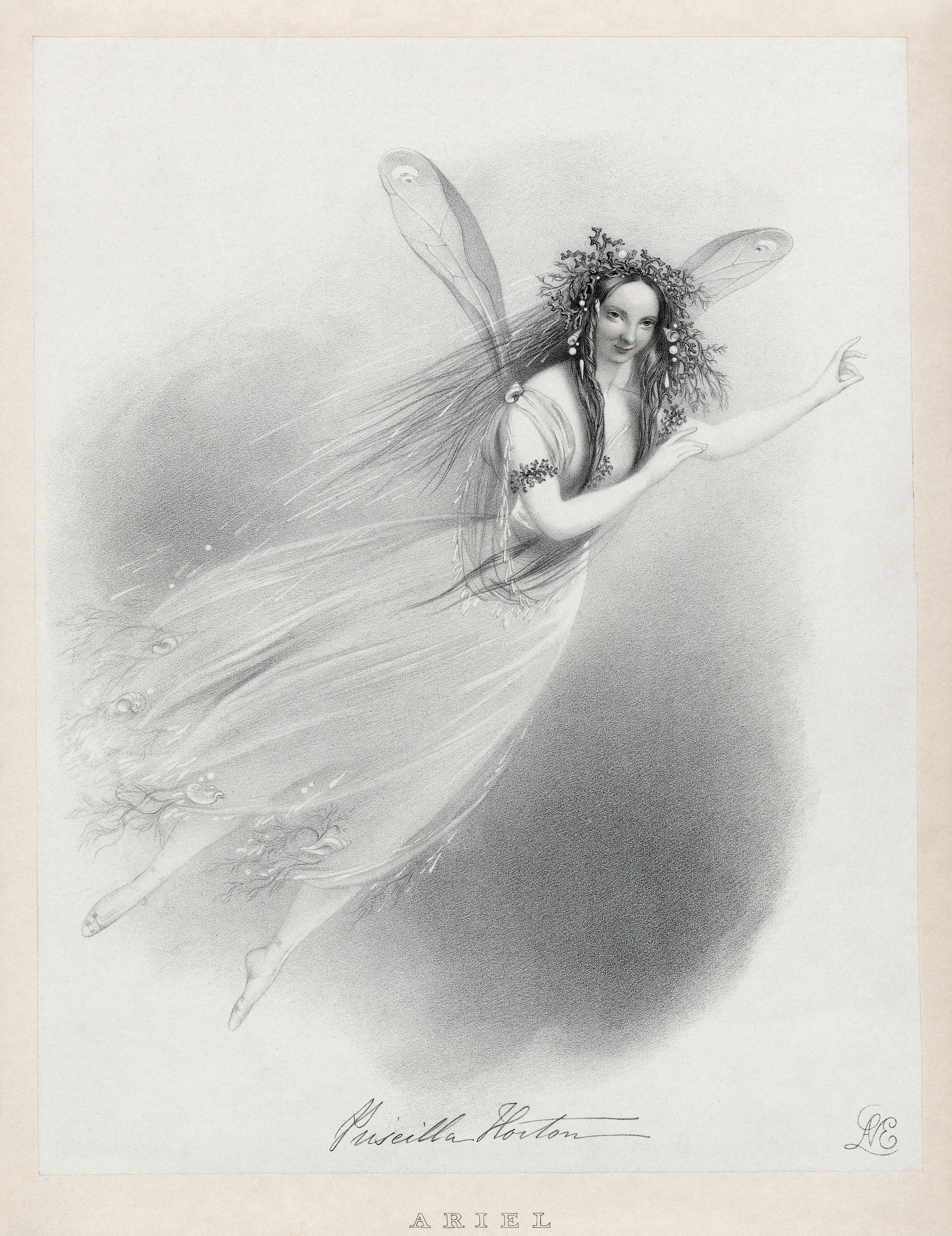
Horton as Ariel in The Tempest, 1838

Priscilla Horton, later Priscilla German Reed (2 January 1818 – 18 March 1895), was an English singer and actress, known for her role as Ariel in W. C. Macready's production of The Tempest in 1838 and "fairy" burlesques at Covent Garden Theatre. Later, she was known, along with her husband, Thomas German Reed, for establishing and performing in the family-friendly German Reed Entertainments. There, she was a mentor to W. S. Gilbert, and her performances inspired Gilbert to create some of his famous contralto roles.

== Life and career ==
=== Early years ===
Horton was born in Birmingham. Her parents were Thomas Horton and Barbara, née Westwater. She performed on the stage in London from the age of ten, when she played the Gipsy Girl in Guy Mannering at the Surrey Theatre. The next year, Horton sang at Vauxhall Gardens. In 1830, she appeared at Covent Garden Theatre as Mealey Mouth in Harlequin, Pat, and Bat. In 1834, at the Royal Victorian Theatre, Horton played Julia in a musical adaptation of Guy Mannering, Kate in Sheridan Knowles's melodrama The Beggar's Daughter of Bethnal Green, Romeo, Desdemona in Othello, and Oscar in Gustavus the Third. In 1837, she joined in W. C. Macready's company at Covent Garden Theatre. There she played Mopsa in The Winter's Tale, the Boy in Henry V, and the Fool in King Lear. After other successful roles, Horton played Ariel in Macready's production of The Tempest in 1838 at Covent Garden.

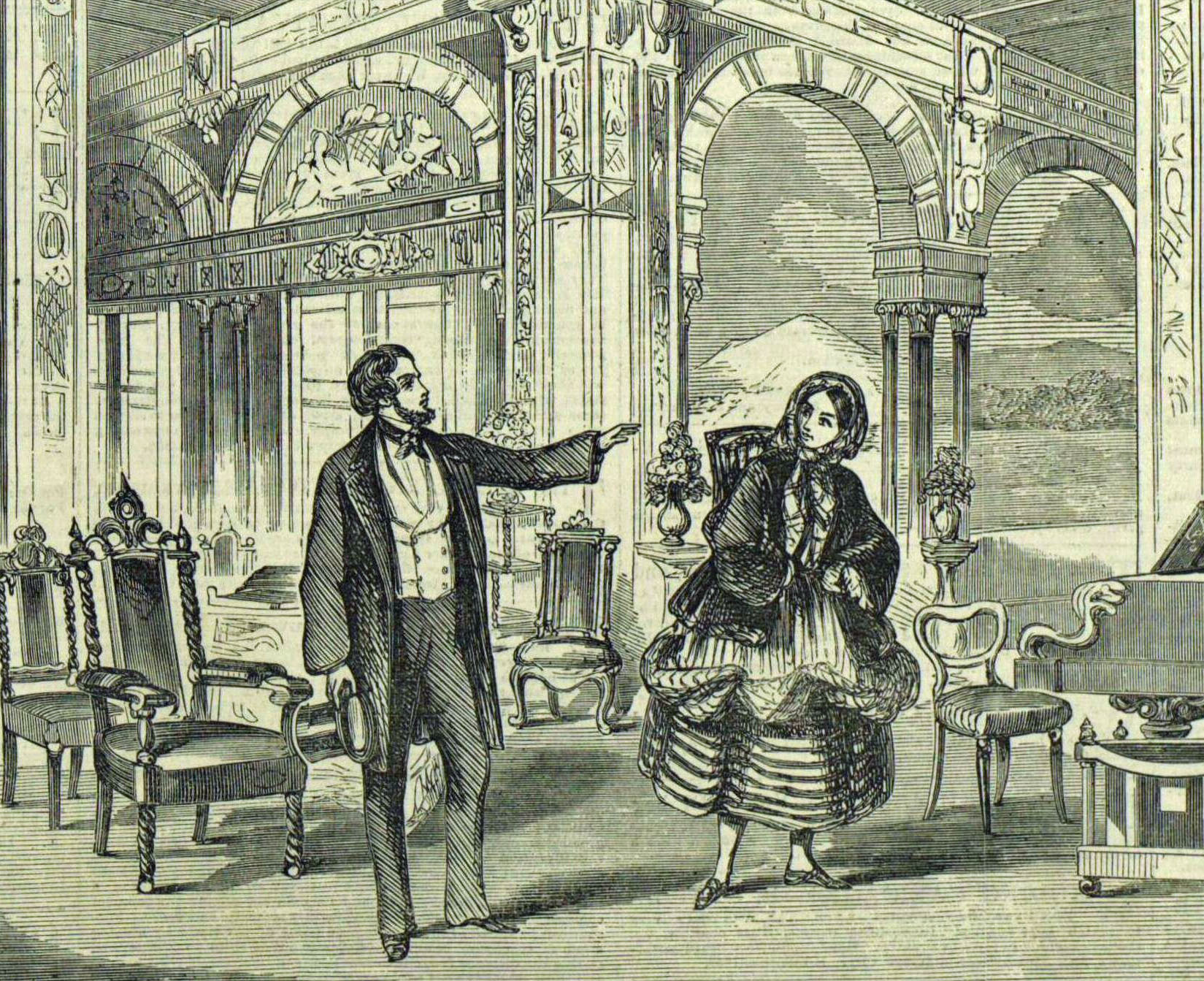
Drawing of Priscilla German Reed in both the parts she played in an 1857 double bill: the title roles in The Flower-boy and The Scotch Fisher-girl

Blonde and blue eyed, Horton had sometimes played in "trouser roles", which, by the time Horton entered the profession, had lost much of their risqué aura. She was a favourite of James Planché, Charles Dickens and Madame Vestris and was known for her agile dancing and clear contralto singing voice. The historian Paul Buczkowski wrote of her, "Horton brought a lively intelligence to her roles, and was almost as highly lauded in tragedy (for instance, as Ophelia in Hamlet and the Fool in King Lear) as in comedy. She would appear in most of Planché's later works, substantially enriching them."

From 1840 to 1847, Horton joined Benjamin Nottingham Webster's company at the Haymarket Theatre, where she first played Ophelia in 1840. The Athenaeum wrote: "The only striking novelty in the performance is the Ophelia of Miss P. Horton, which approaches very nearly to the wild pathos of the original in one scene, and is touching and beautiful in all." The same year, she created the role of Georgina Vesey in Edward Bulwer-Lytton's Money. In 1842, she sang the role of Acis in Handel's Acis and Galatea. At the Haymarket Theatre from 1843 to 1847, she appeared in many of her Planché Christmas and Easter pieces. During these years, she also appeared at the Theatre Royal, Drury Lane as Philidel in Henry Purcell's opera King Arthur (1842) and created the girl/boy roles of Myrtina/Fortunio in Planché's Fortunio and his Seven Gifted Servants (1843).

In 1843, the Morning Chronicle praised "the light, airy, and imaginative" quality of a piece performed by Horton, called "The Elfin's Revel", composed by Charles Frederick Hall.

=== Marriage and later years ===
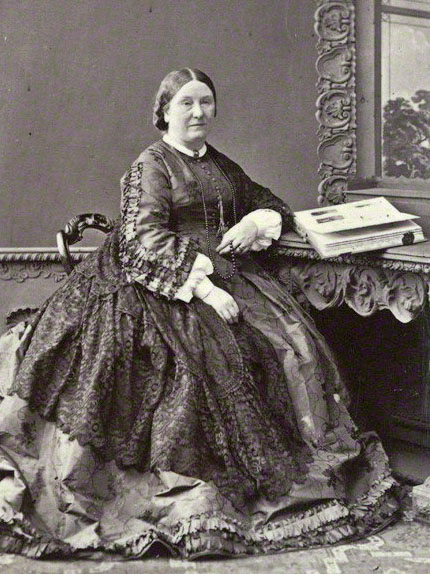
Priscilla German Reed, mid-1860s

She married Thomas German Reed in 1844, although a marriage to another man was erroneously reported in the London press the year before: "Miss P. Horton, the Ariel of Drury Lane, and the universal favorite of all playgoers, is no longer Miss Horton. She has given her hand, we learn, to a Mr. Wheatley, a respectable wharfinger" It turned out, though, that Mr. Wheatley, "a lighterman and barge owner at Lambeth," had married a daughter of Thomas Gladstane, lessee of the Adelphi Theatre.

From 1847 to 1854, Horton continued to play roles at the Haymarket, Drury Lane and Olympic theatres as well as in provincial tours. One 1851 role was Hecate in Macready's farewell Macbeth.

In the spring of 1855, the German Reeds presented the first performance of "Miss P. Horton's Illustrative Gatherings," musical theatre performances usually consisting of one or two brief comic operas designed for a minimal number of characters and performed with either the piano and harmonium or a small ensemble of musicians. These soon became "Mr. And Mrs. German Reed's Entertainments", presented at the Royal Gallery of Illustration in Regent Street (and later at St. George's Hall). To help lend respectability to their family-friendly entertainments, they called their establishment the "Gallery" of Illustration, rather than a "theatre", and the pieces they put on were called "entertainments," rather than plays, extravaganzas, or burlesques, to interest family audiences who were afraid of the bad reputation in which the professional theatre was regarded at the time.

The entertainments focused on satire and "clean" comedy, eschewing any hint of the vulgarity that permeated the London stage. Reed himself composed the music for many of these pieces, and often appeared in them, together with Mrs. German Reed. Horton was a mentor to the dramatist W. S. Gilbert, who wrote six short operas for the German Reeds, each with a prominent role for Horton, and these roles became the pattern for his later contralto characters in the Savoy Operas.

Thomas retired in 1871, and Horton, together with their son, Alfred (1847–1895), continued the entertainments until her retirement in 1879, when Alfred took over their production until 1895. She retired from performing in 1879. She died at the age of 77 at Bexley Heath, Kent.
