= Robert Brough (actor) =

Robert Brough (1857 – 21 April 1906) was born in England to a family prominent in literature and the theatre. He had a notable career as actor and manager in Australia.

== History ==
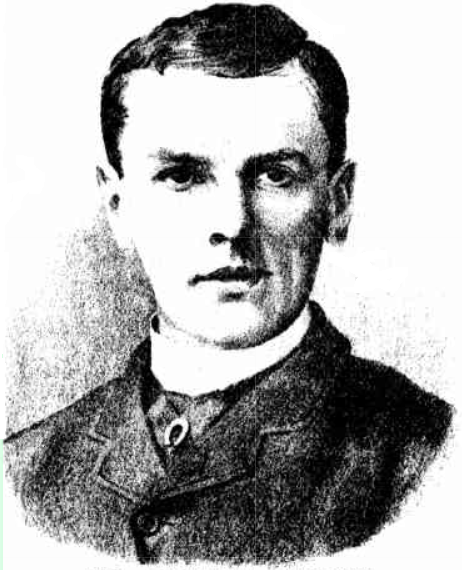
Robert Brough

Brough was born Lionel Barnabas Brough in England, son of Robert Barnabas Brough (1828–1860) journalist, poet and librettist, and Elizabeth Brough, nḗe Romer. Actress Fanny Brough was a sister.

His parents had ambitions for him in the world of commerce, but he soon decided on a stage career, and Edward Saker found a part for him in his show Little Em'ly, an adaptation of David Copperfield, in Glasgow in 1870. Brough was introduced to Florence Trevelyan when he started working with the D'Oyley Carte No. 2 Company, and shortly after they married he was put on a three-year contract at the Gaiety. They moved to Australia under contract to J. C. Williamson, first appearing in Melbourne in the Australian première of Iolanthe.

His first Sydney appearance was in July 1885 under contract to Williamson, Garner & Musgrove singing the comic part of innkeeper Taboureau (bass) in La petite Mademoiselle from an operetta by Charles Lecocq, at the Theatre Royal. There was no part for Mrs Brough, so she accepted a part in The Private Secretary, being staged by Frank Thornton at the Gaiety Theatre. They next reprised their Melbourne successes as the Lord Chancellor and Queen of the Fairies in Iolanthe.

In 1886 Brough and Dion Boucicault Jr. formed the Brough-Boucicault Comedy Company to play burlesques, then in 1888 began production of higher-class comedy, with G. S. Titheradge, who had also been playing with Williamson, Garner & Musgrove. The Bijou Theatre, Melbourne, had become their headquarters following the Majeroni's setbacks, but on 22 April 1889 the theatre was destroyed by fire with the loss of all their costumes, scenery, music and the rest, including much personal property which had been stowed there, none of it insured. Two volunteer firemen died fighting the blaze. They had been due to open with Betsy (F. C. Burnand's reworking of Bébé and did their best at the Hibernian Hall, but the Melbourne audience proved fickle, and stayed away. The company, with its new members Eille Norwood, Fanny Enson, Lilian Seccombe, and Percy Lyndal moved to the Criterion, Sydney for a year to recover.

In 1894, Boucicault returned to London, where he picked up new plays and actors, including Geraldine Cliffe, Beryl Faber and Arthur Elwood.

Boucicault left the partnership in 1896, and the Broughs pressed on, touring Australia, and later through China and India. They returned to Great Britain, where they picked up a new cast and returned to Melbourne, playing at the Bijou Theatre.

When comedian George P. Carey, who had worked with Brough, assembled a small troupe to tour inland New South Wales, Brough lent him three titles which he had licensed: Paulton's Niobe, Grundy's A Village Priest and Pinero's The Second Mrs Tanqueray.

In 1900 he famously picked up Gregan McMahon, toured Australia and New Zealand, India and China again, then in 1902 disbanded. Among the plays produced was Wilde's An Ideal Husband in 1895, a bold move according to one historian, "at the height of his notoriety", though the author's trial for indecency was some months away.

In 1905, Brough entered his last partnership, with Herbert Flemming, which they agreed would be for one year with the option of renewing, but that date coincided almost exactly with Brough's death.

Professional theatre in the Colonies differed from that in England, where a "hit" show can run continuously for weeks or months, and actors can settle into their parts. Brough's companies had to be agile, continually rehearsing new shows in preparation for a drop in attendance, and when touring to have ree or four titles ready for production. Brough reckoned he and his wife had played over 250 characters each in less than 25 years. Three parts for which Brough was particularly remembered are:

- Cayley Drummle in Pinero's The Second Mrs Tanqueray
- Jean Torquenie in Sydney Grundy's A Village Priest
- Captain Barley, in W. W. Jacobs' comedy Beauty and the Barge

== Death ==
When the Brough-Flemming company reached Perth on what was to be their final tour, he was compelled to miss the opening performances, but played in the first Sydney season and throughout the New Zealand tour. He made two appearances in J. M. Barrie's Quality Street during the return season in Sydney before taking another break. He made an appearance, his last, as the "Earl of Carlton" in the first Australian production of Little Mary (also by Barrie) before being hospitalised.

Brough died of a heart disease in a private hospital on Darlinghurst Road, Sydney. It was not unexpected, as he had been ailing for a year.

The funeral service was held in the mortuary chapel adjacent Christ Church, George Street, Sydney and his remains were interred at the Waverley Cemetery, witnessed by his widow along with friends and admirers. His company was already on the train for Brisbane, and could not attend, but were represented by Alec. Mayne, a longtime associate.

A cast iron three–tiered fountain was dedicated to Robert Brough by friends and Australasian theatre managers following his death. The fountain was announced in April 1907 and fabricated by the Coalbrookdale Iron Foundry, later unveiled by the Premier of NSW, Sir Charles Gregory Wade MLA on 18 November 1907. It is located inside the courtyard of the Sydney Hospital adjacent the Nightingale Wing and the North Block.

== Appreciation ==
In an interview by Beaumont Smith for the Adelaide Gadfly, Brough's late partner Herbert Flemming recounted how they first met some twenty years earlier, when Brough was playing for Williamson in Patience and about to join with Boucicault in The Magistrate at the Bijou. Flemming noted that beside his stagecraft, which was of the highest order, he was impressed with his thoroughness and generosity — "he lived for two things, his wife and his art"; his consideration and patience, with never a thought for himself — when convalescing in the Blue Mountains he apologised to Flemming for the trouble he was causing. And his wife was of the same ilk; after his death she supported the idea of a hospital bed in her husband's name, but refused any kind of benefit for herself — she would sooner "work to her dying day".

== Family ==
Barnabas Brough (c. 1795–1854) author notorious for testifying against Chartist demonstrators

- William Brough (writer) (1826–1870) married Ann Romer, sister of Elizabeth
- Robert Barnabas Brough (1828–1860) married Elizabeth Romer, a.k.a. "Miss Emily Romer" (died 1901). (Note: Widowed, Brough's mother married again and had a daughter, Brenda Gibson. Widowed again, she joined her son's troupe, playing grande dame parts as "Miss Emily Romer". She died on board ship while returning to England with her daughter.)

- Frances Whiteside Brough (7 July 1852 – 30 November 1914), a.k.a. Fanny Brough, actress
- Lionel Barnabas Brough (1857 – 21 April 1906), Robert Brough, subject of this article, married Florence Major (stage name "Florence Trevelyan") around 1884. His widow in 1909 married one George Bell Charles Bell or Cyril Bell, (Note: Mrs Brough, in her memoir calls him Cyril.) and as Mrs Brough-Bell, she died 7 January 1932.
The widowed Elizabeth Brough married again, to James Gibson; they had a daughter:
- Brenda Gibson ( – ) married John Jones-Hewson, a baritone from the Savoy Theatre, on 6 August 1898. He died from consumption in England four years later. They had a son while in Australia.

- John Cargill Brough (1834–1872) science writer
- Lionel Brough (1836–1909) actor comedian; author and journalist

- Mary Brough (1863–1934), with Aldwych Theatre
- Sydney "Bobby" Brough (1868–1911), actor
- Margaret "Daisy" Brough (1870–1901), actress
- Percy Brough (1872–1904) toured with the Brough-Boucicault Comedy Company
