= Frances Brough =

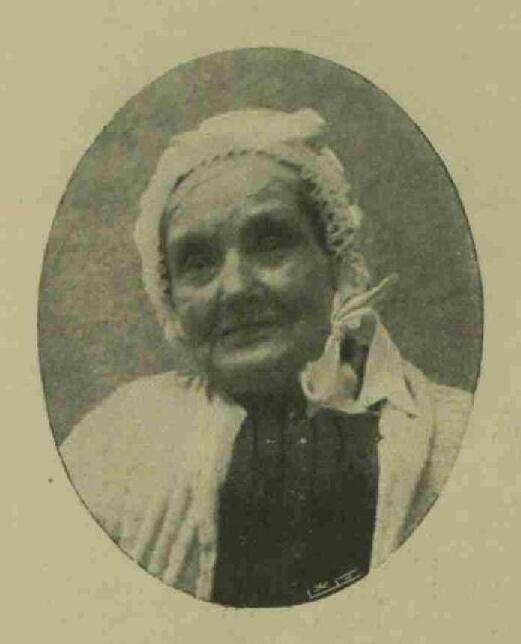
- Born: 1803
- Died: November 23, 1897; Wandsworth Common
- Occupation: Novelist
- Spouse: Barnabas Brough
- Children: William Brough, Robert Barnabas Brough, John Cargill Brough, Lionel Brough

Frances "Fanny" Brough (1803 – November 23, 1897) was a British novelist and poet. She was the matriarch of a family of writers and actors, including her sons William Brough, Robert Barnabas Brough, John Cargill Brough, and Lionel Brough, and grandchildren Fanny Brough and Robert Brough.

She was born Frances Whiteside in 1803. In 1827, she married Barnabas Brough. He worked a variety of jobs in north England and Wales, including wharfinger, wine merchant, brewer, and printer. He was the chief witness against Chartist John Frost following the Newport Rising, and resentment of supporters of the popular Frost caused his businesses to fail and prompted the family to move to London in 1845. He later worked as an accountant, auctioneer, and author.

Fanny Brough published two novels. The first was a two-volume novel, Madame Vernet (1864). The second was a three-volume novel, Hidden Fire (1867), about the Chartists. Her poems included "Karl the Marytr," originally published in The Welcome Guest.

Frances Brough died on 23 November 1897 in Wandsworth Common at the age of 94.

== Bibliography ==
1. Madame Vernet. 2 vol. London: Tinsley Brothers, 1864.
2. Hidden Fire: A Novel. 3 vol. London: Tinsley Brothers, 1867.
