= Matilda of Hungary =

1847 opera by William Vincent Wallace

William Vincent Wallace

Matilda of Hungary is an opera in three acts composed by William Vincent Wallace to an English libretto by Alfred Bunn. It was first performed on 22 February 1847 at the Theatre Royal, Drury Lane, London, with Emma Romer in the title role. Unlike its predecessor, Wallace's first opera, Maritana, it was not a success and quickly vanished from the repertory.

== Composition ==
Wallace's first opera, Maritana, had been produced in 1845 under the management of Alfred Bunn at the Theatre Royal, Drury Lane and went on to international success. Seeking to repeat its success, Bunn wrote a libretto, evidently based on a story of his own devising, about a fictional Queen of Bohemia. The hero's name was borrowed from a 15th-century king of Bohemia, George of Podiebrad, but the events depicted by Butt bear no resemblance to the historical figure's life. Wallace set the piece in a more ambitious musical style than he had used for Maritana, aiming at the manner of grand opera.

== Productions ==
The opera opened at Drury Lane on 22 February 1847. The premiere had been scheduled for a week earlier, but was postponed at the last minute because the leading lady, Emma Romer, was taken ill. The delay caused great annoyance among some of the audience, but whetted public curiosity, and the first performance was given to a capacity audience.

Despite a tumultuous reception at the first night, the piece did not prove popular with the public. In March, Bunn added a ballet, Spanish Gallantries, as an after-piece. In April, Matilda was reduced to one performance a week, and other productions, including a revival of Maritana, starring the same principal performers, were staged on the other nights. After April 1847, no further performances were advertised in the London papers.

== Roles ==
Role	Voice type	Premiere cast (Conductor: The composer)
Count Magnus, First Minister of Bohemia	baritone	Conrado Borrani
Prince Ottokar, Chief Secretary		S Jones
Count Ituriz, Commander of the Forces		Mr Simmonds
Vladimir, a Senator		Mr Howell
George Podiebrad, a Moravian mountaineer	tenor	William Harrison
Mathias, an innkeeper	bass	Willoughby Weiss
Carl		Mr T Mathews
Officer		Mr Morgan
Matilda of Hungary, Queen of Bohemia	soprano	Emma Romer
Lillia, Matilda's attendant	soprano	Rebecca Isaacs

== Synopsis ==
Final scene, with Podiebrad crowned king by Matilda

Matilda of Hungary is the queen consort of King Ladislaus of Bohemia. He is missing, either killed or captured in battle by Turkish forces, and in his absence Matilda is striving to prevent a faction at court from seizing the throne. Fleeing the court, Matilda takes refuge in the mountains, followed by her Minister, Count Magnus. Seeking the throne for himself Magnus proposes marriage and is vehemently rejected by the queen.

Falling in with Podiebrad, a young mountaineer who happens to have an extraordinary likeness to the lost king, Magnus prevails on him to impersonate the missing king. Podiebrad has gallantly saved Matilda's life while hunting, and fallen in love with her without knowing her identity. When he realises that his beloved is the queen he agrees to perpetrate the fraud. He appears as the king, and is joyfully received by the people and by Matilda herself. At first she really believes that he is her husband, but when she realises the deception she goes along with it.

As king, Podiebrad leads his troops to victory and becomes immensely popular with his people. Count Magnus, finding that Podiebrad is not the puppet he planned for, forces an innkeeper, Mathias, to try to shoot the impostor. Mathias fails, and Magnus then seeks to make the deception known in the senate. Podiebrad admits that he is not the real Ladislaus, is nevertheless hailed as king by the senate, and is crowned king by Matilda. Magnus is sentenced to death.

== Musical numbers ==
=== Act I ===
- 1. Chorus: "May Heaven protect the Queen"
- 2. Song – Mathias: "The Prophet his standard was rearing"
- 3. Recitative and air – Podiebrad: "One day I wandered. … It was a form"
- 4. Cavatina – Magnus: "She comes in all her loveliness"
- 5. Duet: Queen and Magnus: "What? shall my bright and spotless crown"
- 6. Chorus: "Before our Queen we kneel
- 7. Recitative and duet – Podiebrad and Magnus: "What form is that … It is my queen"
- 8. Ballad – Podiebrad: "Adieu – fair land"
- 9. Finale – Chorus, Magnus and Podiebrad: "The soldier silently doth stand"

=== Act II ===
- 10. Recitative and air – Queen: "At length in absence mourned"
- 11. Chorus: "This happy day we celebrate"
- 12. Chorus: "Long live the King"
- 13. Canon – Podiebrad, Magnus and Mathias: "The moment comes"
- 14. Barcarole – Podiebrad: "Like waves which o'er the ocean"
- 15. Ballad – Podiebrad: "Gonve is the calmness"
- 16. Duet – Podiebrad and Magnus: "O vengeance – rage and shame"
- 17. Chorus: "Thy fondest wish, they highest aim"
- 18. Romance – Queen: "They who would still be happy"
- 19. Duet – Podiebrad and Queen: "This deep affront I did not need"
- 20. Finale – Chorus, Ottokar, Mathias, Lillia, Podiebrad, Magnus and Queen: "The people, past assuaging"

=== Act III ===
- 21. Recitative – Lillia: "These halls of revels once the scene"
- 22. Ballad – Lillia: "A lovely youth, the mountain child"
- 23. Chorus and Podiebrad: "Oh, welcome with shouts"
- 24. Romance – Queen: "In that devotion which we breathe"
- 25, Chorus: "Suppress these giddy transports"
- 26. Trio – Magnus, Podiebrad and Mathias: "To see my king"
- 27. Duet – Queen and Podiebrad: "What do I hear?"
- 28. Ensemble – All: "Here by our laws for justice"
- 29. Rondo finale – Queen: "One gentle heart"

Source: libretto.

== Critical reaction ==
The opera received lukewarm reviews. The Morning Post thought the libretto suffered from having an obscure and unfamiliar subject. John Bull commented, "We do not greatly object to mere improbability in the story of a drama especially a musical one; but, though a Drury-Lane grand serious opera is scarcely above the level of [a] melodrama yet neither the one nor the other should contain absurdities palpable to a child of ten years old." There was criticism that the character of Matilda was morally repugnant for receiving the attentions of Podiebrad while believing her real husband might be alive.

The music was no better received. Both The Morning Post and The Era found the overture far too long and poorly constructed. Wallace's music was judged "showy but superficial", lacking the freshness and novelty of the score of Maritana. The papers thought the ballads for the soprano and tenor to have nothing to do with the drama and everything to do with their sales as sheet music. In 2012 the critic Andrew Lamb wrote that Bunn's libretto has been dismissed as one of the worst ever written.
