= The Mountain Sylph =

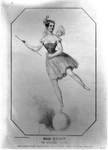
Annette Nelson as 'The Mountain Sylph', 1837

The Mountain Sylph is an opera in two acts by John Barnett to a libretto by Thomas James Thackeray, after Trilby, ou le lutin d'Argail by Charles Nodier. It was first produced in London at the Lyceum Theatre in 1834 with great success.

Often (mistakenly) cited as the first through-composed English opera of the 19th century, it was Barnett's only great success on the stage out of some 30 operas and operettas, and was perhaps the most effective work by an English composer in the style of Carl Maria von Weber. Rarely (if ever) performed in the last century, its plot was parodied by W. S. Gilbert in his libretto for the Savoy Opera Iolanthe (1882).

== Background ==
The story-line of The Mountain Sylph, based on Nodier's tale, had already been adapted in 1832 by the singer Adolphe Nourrit as the basis of the ballet La Sylphide, and it was probably the success of the ballet in Paris, where the cast included the famous ballerina, Marie Taglioni, which brought the subject to Barnett's attention. In any case, the opera more closely follows the story of the ballet than that of Nodier's story.

Before The Mountain Sylph, Barnett had mainly written comic operettas, incidental music and songs for plays, and burlesques and adaptations of popular foreign works, including the opera Robert le diable by his distant cousin Giacomo Meyerbeer. The Mountain Sylph owes its larger scale to a fortunate accident. As Barnett wrote in a note to the published score:

The following (my first attempt at legitimate Opera), was, in its original form, intended as a Musical Drama for the Victoria Theatre, and written for an incomplete band; but, finding the difficulty of producing it at that theatre insurmountable, owing to the want of numbers, both on stage and in the orchestra, I was obliged to abandon my project; and this difficulty first suggested the idea of heightening it to an opera for the New Lyceum.

Barnett's opera was the second production at the Lyceum, following Edward Loder's Nourjahad. The proprietor of the Lyceum, Samuel James Arnold (to whom Barnett had been articled at the age of 11), had specifically relaunched the theatre as the 'English Opera House', and the Sylph provided him with a useful hit. On the hundredth performance, Arnold gave a large banquet for the composer, cast, musicians and production team.

Although Barnett made extended use in the opera of recitative, it has been shown that there was also spoken dialogue, and the palm for being the first through-composed opera of the period must go to Charles Horn's Dirce of 1823, which was unsuccessful and sank without trace. In The Mountain Sylph, the rich scoring and use of recurring motifs to suggest elements of the supernatural showed that the composer had well learnt the lessons of Weber, whose Oberon and Der Freischütz had been popular in London from the 1820s.

Barnett's contemporaries were aware of the opera's qualities; George Alexander Macfarren wrote that "its production opened a new period for music in this country, from which is to be dated the establishment of an English dramatic school". However, by 1949, the musicologist Edward J. Dent opined that "the libretto is ludicrously awkward" and "the construction is very amateurish and the music is always coming to a dead stop when it ought to go on". A 2002 assessment was that the music of the opera "is patchy, but often rather good, and well deserves a revival in an age interested in novelty and engaged (rather than rendered apoplectic) by lightweight prettiness.... where he lets us down, and lets us down consistently, is in the comparative flatness and sameness of his solo arias and in his frequent failure to inflect them with any kind of dramatic urgency.... But when he is able to get his teeth into the few big ensembles and scenas that Thackeray gave him, Barnett does evolve dynamic musical textures that glow, even if their fire is very pale."

In 1837 The Mountain Sylph was presented as a "grand melodramatic spectacle" at the National Theatre in Washington, DC, with Annette Nelson in the role of Aeolia. In the audience were a number of Native American chiefs, who presented Miss Nelson with traditional headwear in appreciation.

The Mountain Sylph was Barnett's only major operatic success. His other large scale operas (Fair Rosamond (1837) and Farinelli (1839)) flourished only briefly. The Mountain Sylph does not seem to have been revived since the early 20th century; the last known performance was in 1906 at the Guildhall School of Music. Gilbert and Sullivan's comic opera Iolanthe (1882) parodies themes from The Mountain Sylph. In that work, for the love of a mortal, the fairy Iolanthe is banished from fairy society with the consent of her Queen. Typically Gilbertian absurdities are introduced to fairyland: the shepherd, who is the son of Iolanthe and her mortal husband, turns out to be "half a fairy". That is, his body and brain are fairy, but his legs are mortal. Furthermore, the magical fairies are contrasted with the prosaic House of Lords, and ultimately they all fall in love.

== Roles ==
Role	Voice type	Premiere Cast, August 25, 1834 (Conductor: Mr. Hawes)
Donald, a shepherd, engaged to Jessie	tenor	John Wilson
Hela, the Wizard of the Glen	baritone	Henry Phillips
Christie, Donald's rival for Jessie	tenor	
Bailie McWhapple, a lawyer	baritone	
Ashtaroth, Lord of the Underworld	baritone	
Aeolia, the Mountain Sylph	soprano	Emma Romer
Etheria, Queen of the Sylphs	soprano	
Jessie	soprano	
Dame Gourlie, Jessie's mother	contralto	
Chorus: sylphs, peasants, witches, salamanders, spirits, etc.

== Synopsis ==
=== Act 1 ===
In the Scottish Highlands, a group of sylphs find Donald asleep. Aeolia falls in love with him and casts a spell on him. He is, however, due to marry Jessie. The envious Christie calls on Hela the Wizard to assist him in winning Jessie for himself. He is unexpectedly advantaged when Aeolia spirits Donald away at his wedding.

=== Act II ===
Hela gives Donald a scarf, which he assures him will bind Aeolia to him. However, when she puts it on she is transported to the underworld of Ashtaroth. Etheria, Queen of the Sylphs, gives Donald a magic rose. With its help he enters the underworld and rescues Aeolia. On their return Etheria marries the couple, Aeolia accepting that she will lose her immortality. Jessie and Christie also marry.

== Recordings ==
The overture was included in British Opera Overtures, recorded by Victorian Opera Orchestra, with Richard Bonynge conducting.
