= Farinelli (opera) =

Opera by John Barnett

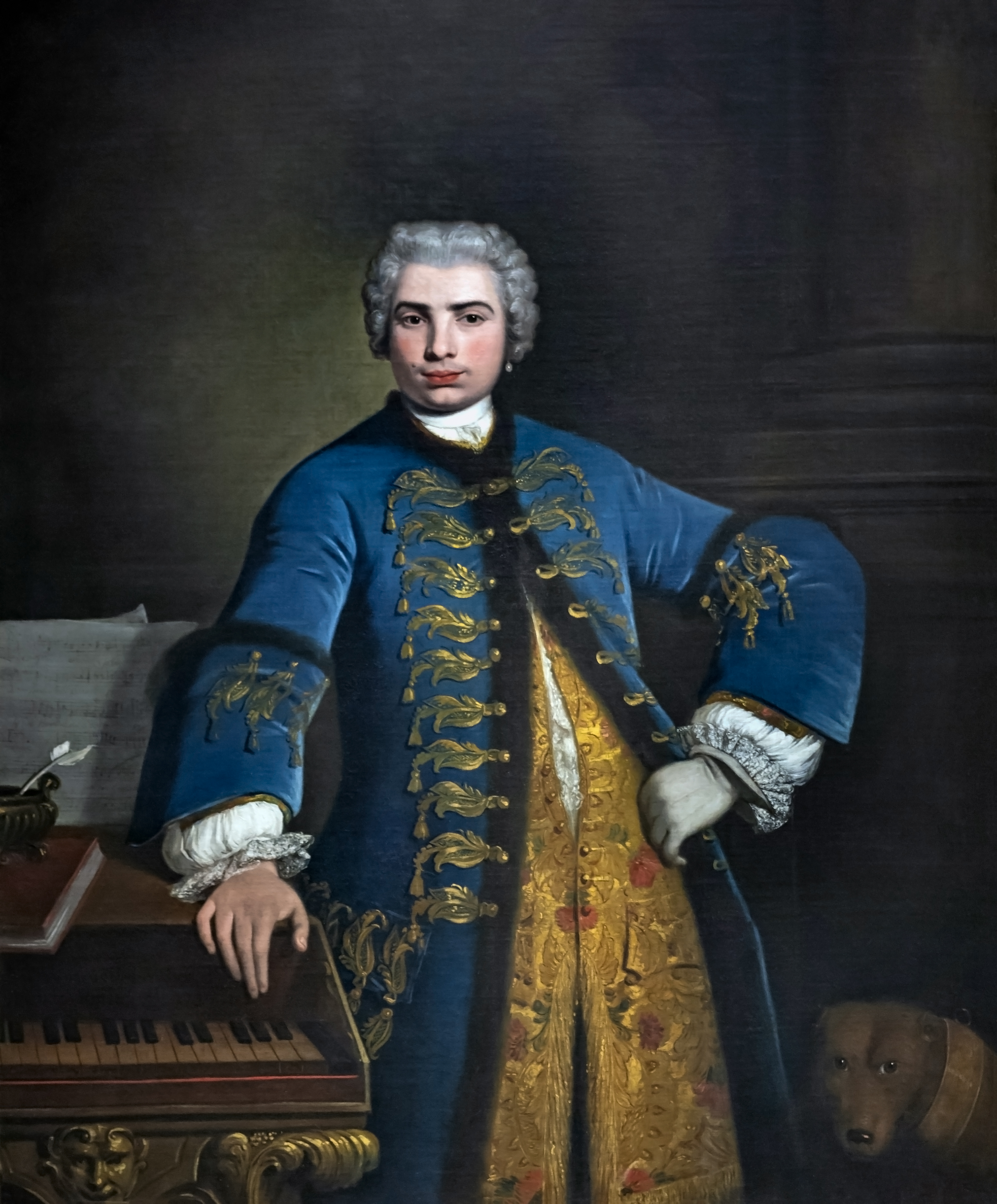
The historical Farinelli, by Bartolomeo Nazari 1734

Farinelli is an opera in two acts, described as 'serio-comic', by John Barnett, to a libretto by his brother Charles Zachary Barnett. Produced in 1839, it is the third of the composer's large-scale operas, and was the last to reach the stage. The hero is the castrato singer Farinelli, although the storyline of the opera is fictional.

== Background ==
The success of Barnett's 1834 opera, The Mountain Sylph, encouraged further commissions, though neither was as successful as the Sylph. Fair Rosamond appeared in 1837, and Farinelli was premiered on 8 February 1839 at the Theatre Royal, Drury Lane.

The book is an adaptation of the anonymous Farinelli, ou le Bouffe du Roi, premiered in Paris in 1835. The story is based on the legend that, while he was in the service of Philip V of Spain, the beauty of Farinelli's singing was able to cure the king of his melancholia. Whilst it is true that as chamber musician to the king Farinelli had influence at the Spanish court, there is no record of him ever becoming involved with court politics as the opera implies.

For the purpose of the opera Farinelli becomes a tenor; at the premiere the role was taken by the composer and singer Michael William Balfe. In fact the role was originally written as a baritone for Henry Philips. who had taken the role of Hela in the Sylph, but he withdrew following a quarrel with the theatre manager. At the first night, Balfe broke down through a fit of nervousness, and this naturally affected the reception of the opera, which nevertheless received over 50 performances. Barnett's subsequent opera, Kathleen was however never brought to the public stage, although it was rehearsed at the theatre of which Barnett was then part proprietor.

== Roles ==
| Role | Voice type | Premiere Cast, February 2, 1839 (Conductor: William Hawes) |
|---|---|---|
| Philip V, King of Spain | | Mr. Sutton |
| Don Gil Polo, his chamberlain | | Mr. Giubilei |
| Farinelli | tenor | Michael William Balfe |
| Elizabeth Farnese, Queen of Spain | soprano | Emma Romer |
| Leonora, niece to Gil Polo | soprano | Elizabeth Poole |
| Theodore, a page | soprano | Miss Fowle |
Chorus: courtiers, citizens, etc.

== Synopsis ==
The opera is set in the Prado. Gil Polo is plotting against the King. Farinelli, who is in love with the chamberlain's niece, Leonora, learns of the plot. His singing rouses the melancholic king to action; Gil is dismissed and exiled, Farinelli is honoured and can marry Leonora.

== Sources ==
- C.Z. Barnett, Farinelli, a serio-comic opera in two acts, London, 1839
- C. K. Salaman, English Opera in the Musical Times, vol. 18 no. 411, 1877
