= Harriett Everard =

English singer and actress

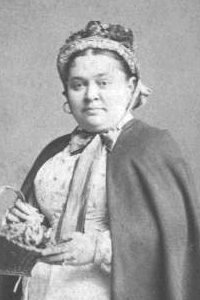
Harriett Everard as Little Buttercup in H.M.S. Pinafore

Harriett Everard (12 March 1844 – 22 February 1882) was an English singer and actress best known for originating the role of Little Buttercup in the Gilbert and Sullivan hit H.M.S. Pinafore in 1878. The character regretfully reveals a key secret that sets up the ending of the opera.

Everard had a stage career of 20 years, although she died at the age of 37. She appeared, for the first 15 of these, in numerous burlesques, pantomimes, comic operas, comic plays and even some dramas. She played in a few of W. S. Gilbert's early plays before becoming part of Richard D'Oyly Carte's company at the Opera Comique, creating the role of Mrs. Partlett in The Sorcerer as well as the part of Little Buttercup. She was scheduled to originate the role of Ruth in The Pirates of Penzance, but she was forced to withdraw after an onstage accident during a rehearsal that caused her serious injury. She returned to the stage, briefly, but it is said that she never fully recovered.

== Early life and career ==
Everard was born Harriette Emily Woollams in Marylebone, London, the eldest of at least seven children of John Woollams, a builder and paper stainer (from the family that owned the Woollams wallpaper company), and his wife Harriet née Graves. She was raised partly by her aunt and her husband, Emily and Frederic Aumonier. Everard was her grandmother's maiden name.

Everard made her first known stage appearance in Exeter, at the Theatre Royal, about 1861, and in Swansea and Plymouth from 1862 to 1863, earning warm notices for her singing in the burlesques, pantomimes and comic operas, such as adaptations of Guy Mannering, Rob Roy, Aladdin, Ruy Blas and Fortunio. In 1864, she was at the Surrey Theatre in Sheffield appearing in Sinbad Guy Mannering and Rob Roy. That summer, she appeared at Jersey's Queen's Assembly Rooms. By then she had married, or said she married, a Mr Arthur Parry. Later that year, she returned to London at the New Greenwich Theatre as Leicester in Kenilworth, Charlotte in The Stranger, Sybil in Jack in the Giant Killer, and Apollo in Ixion. In these early years she was cast in soubrette roles (the theatrical paper The Era described her as "sufficiently arch and saucy"), and in breeches roles in Christmas shows.

== Peak career ==
Everard (left) in H. J. Byron's Dearer Than Life, 1868, with (seated) J. L. Toole, Lionel Brough and Henry Irving

In 1866, at the age of 21, she joined London's Olympic Theatre, where she played Prince Pecki in the Olympic's new burlesque Princess Primrose and the Four Pretty Princes, earning warm reviews for her singing and acting, and Cordelia Jemima in the drama Love's Martyrdom. She was also cast in character roles, such as the domineering Queen Greymare in the first English adaptation of Offenbach's Barbe-bleue. In 1867, she played a season at the Victoria Theatre was later in Liverpool at the St James's Hall. She played Mopes the maid in Pygmalion, Princess Bariatinski in Tom Taylor's The Serf and Mrs Raby in Miriam's Crime. There, still only 23 years old, she originated the role of the fading Marchioness of Birkenfelt, the first of W. S. Gilbert's long series of "elderly, ugly" women, in his second operatic burlesque, La Vivandière. She was the only member of the cast to be re-engaged for the London production six months later at the Queen's Theatre, starring Lionel Brough. There she also played Mrs Corney to Brough's Bumble in The Gnome King, Mrs Spriggins in Ixion parle français, Polly in Not Guilty, Mrs Fielding in Dot, and Mrs Subtle in Paul Pry. In 1868, at the same theatre, she appeared as "the clamorous landlady" in H.J. Byron's serio-comic play Dearer Than Life, starring J. L. Toole, with Henry Irving in a supporting role.

In early 1869, she played a season at the Royal Alfred Theatre in 1869 as Hectae in Macbeth and Bleuzabella in The Invisible Prince. She then joined Mrs. John Wood's company, in which Brough also appeared, at the St James's Theatre and on tour. Among various other roles, Evarard made an impression there in a burlesque, La Belle Sauvage, as the over-the-top schoolmistress Kros-as-can-be. In 1870 she played one of the undergraduates in Gilbert's play The Princess. She returned to the Queen's Theatre in an adaptation of The Last Days of Pompeii and was at the Royalty Theatre in Bohemia and Belgravia and as Mme Deschapelles in The Lady of Lyons. She also appeared with Brough in James Planché's Babil and Bijou at The Royal Opera House in Covent Garden. At the Princess's Theatre in 1873, she appeared as the Spirit of Memory in Undine, among various other roles, and as Queen of Catland in Little Puss in Boots, where she was called "one of the best things in the pantomime". After this, she received enthusiastic reviews as Aurore in Giroflé-Girofla and played Mrs Bundle in The Waterman. In 1875, she appeared at the Charing Cross Theatre in a season of comedies and played Mrs O'Kelly at the Theatre Royal, Drury Lane in the London premiere of The Shaughraun. The following year, she was in Gilbert's Pygmalion and Galatea at the Alexandra Palace and later at the Charing Cross played Mrs Winkle in Young Rip van Winkle and Mrs Grimley in 20 Pounds a Year. She also toured with Joseph Eldred and played in the company of the Strand Theatre.

== D'Oyly Carte and last years ==
Everard joined Richard D'Oyly Carte's company at the Opera Comique after numerous appearances throughout London. It was for him, in November 1877, that she created the part of Mrs. Partlett in Gilbert and Sullivan's comic opera The Sorcerer. When The Spectre Knight by James Albery and Alfred Cellier was added to the programme in February 1878, she created the part of the First Lady-in-Waiting ("a capital Dueña", px|wrote The Examiner).

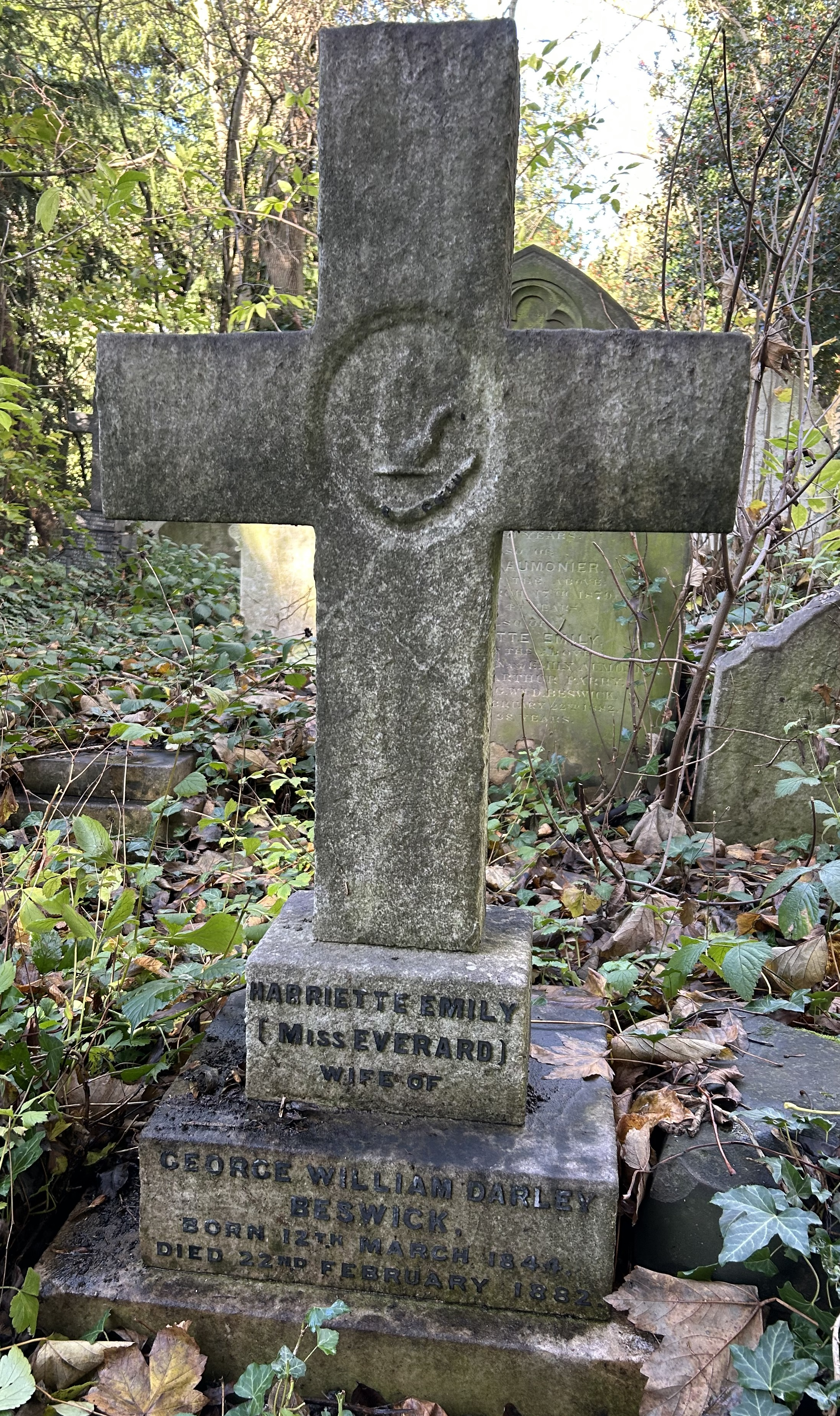
Grave of Harriet Everard in Highgate Cemetery

Everard also created the role of Little Buttercup in H.M.S. Pinafore when it opened in May 1878, playing the role for the duration of the long run, until February 1880. The character, described as a Bumboat woman, regretfully reveals a key secret that sets up the ending of the opera: as a wetnurse many years before the time of the opera, she had mixed up two babies, one who became the captain of the Pinafore, and the other who became a sailor on board his ship, who is caught eloping with the captain's daughter. During a scuffle at the Opera Comique, early in the run of Pinafore, when Carte's former backers tried to seize the scenery and properties during a performance and were repelled by the backstage crew, Everard earned admiration for carrying on bravely with the show. In 1879 she married again (or for the first time, if her first marriage was never sanctified) to a commission agent, George William Darley Beswick, a man seven years her junior.

Everard was next cast to play Ruth in The Pirates of Penzance, when she became the victim of an accident during rehearsals for the piece. Rutland Barrington was a witness to the incident and later described it thus:

She was standing in the centre of the stage at rehearsal one morning, when I noticed the front piece of a stack of scenery falling forward. I called to her to run, and got my back against the falling wing and broke its force to a great extent, but it nevertheless caught her on the head, taking off a square of hair as neatly as if done with a razor. The shock and injury laid her up for some time.

As a consequence, Everard missed the opening performance of Pirates in London on 3 April 1880, being replaced as Ruth by Emily Cross. Although she was able to assume the role in June, her run did not last long – she turned the part over to Alice Barnett in July when the New York company returned to England. Everard then left the D'Oyly Carte company and continued to work for only the next several months; her last recorded appearance was as Aunt Priscilla de Montmorency in Francis Marshall's comic opera Lola in January 1881.

Everard died just over a year later, in London, at the age of 37, apparently having never completely recovered from the accident, although some sources report that she died of consumption. She was buried in Highgate Cemetery.
