= A Peculiar Family =

1865 comedy play by William Brough

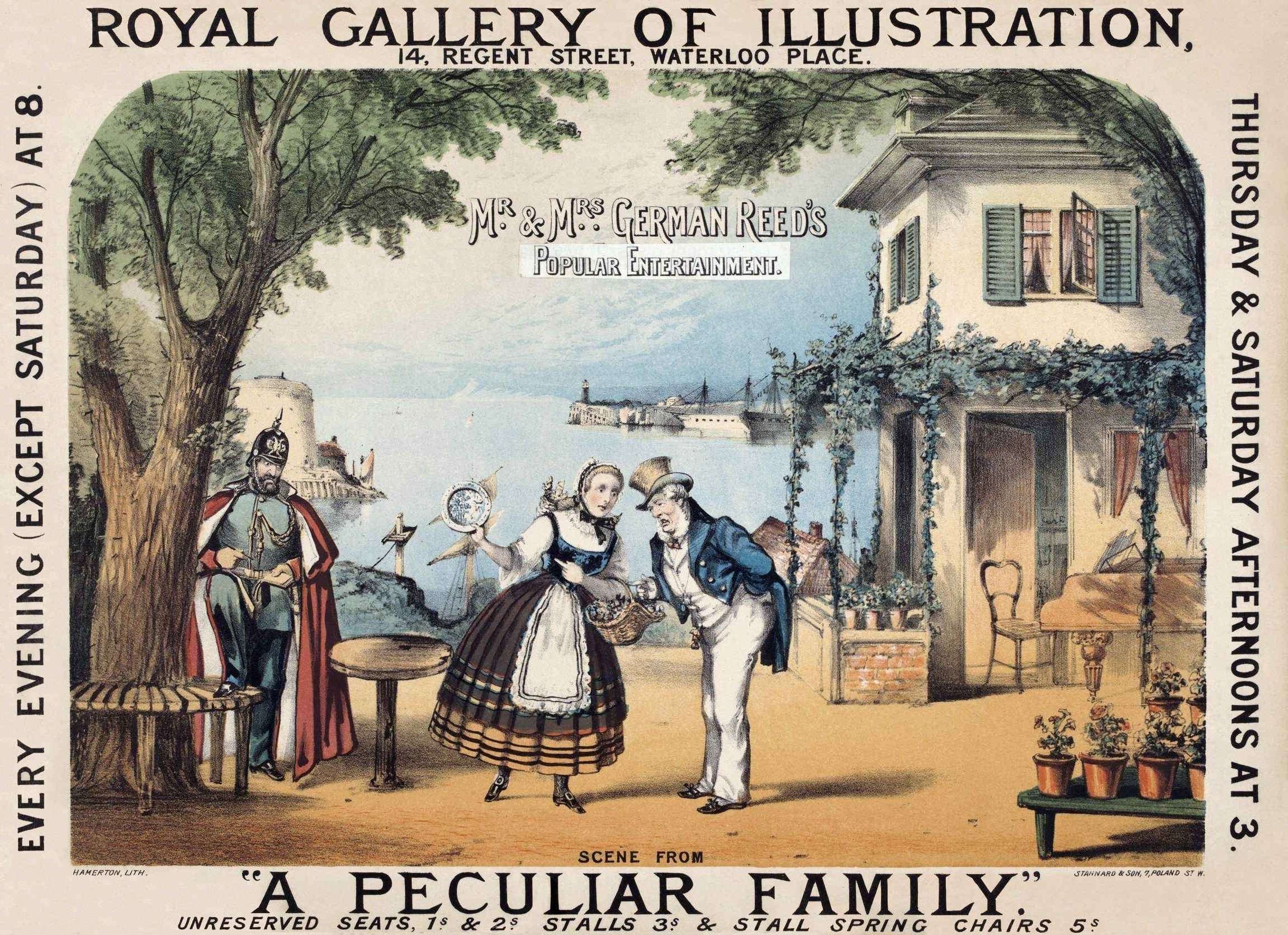
Poster for A Peculiar Family

A Peculiar Family is a comedy play, sometimes described as a "chamber operetta", written by the English writer William Brough, featuring music by Thomas German Reed and starring German Reed, his wife Priscilla German Reed and John Parry. It is part of the series known as the German Reed Entertainments. The story concerns Barnaby Bounce and his eccentric family, who arrive at a French hotel. Barnaby has accidentally acquired an unusual hat that gets him caught up in the investigation of a crime committed by the hat's previous owner.

The piece premiered at the German Reeds' London theatre, the Royal Gallery of Illustration, on 15 March 1865. It was revived "periodically" after its "decided" success "as one of the most pleasing musical entertainments of the metro-polis", including in July and December of the same year.

== Background ==
The German Reeds presented respectable, family-friendly musical entertainments at their Gallery of Illustration beginning in 1855, at a time when the theatre in Britain had gained a poor reputation as an unsavoury institution and was not attended by much of the middle class, and rarely by wives and children. Shakespeare was played, but most of the entertainments available in theatres consisted of poorly translated French operettas, risqué burlesques and incomprehensible broad farces. The Gallery of Illustration was a 500-seat theatre with a small stage that allowed for only four or five characters with accompaniment by a piano, harmonium and sometimes a harp. William Brough had written a series of entertainments for the German Reeds in the 1850s and 60s with music composed or arranged by Thomas German Reed.

== Synopsis ==
An eccentric London family have recently arrived on a steamship at a hotel on the coast of France, consisting of Barnaby Bounce, his sister Cherry Bounce, nephews Felix Flitter and Phoeble Bounce, and his grandfather. A German detective officer, Herr Von Doppelslich, who wears a gaudy uniform, is working with the area's police to investigate a crime committed by a family of political refugees, one of whom has been seen wearing an unusual hat. He is talking to the landlady of the hotel when the peculiar Bounce family arrives. Barnaby, a retired trunk-maker and would-be travel author, is wearing a white hat with a black rim resembling the fugitive's hat. He claims that the hat was procured by mistake from a fellow passenger on the steamer. Von Dopelslich warns him that he will be "watshed!", by which the heavily-accented detective means "watched".

Additional humor is added by the faulty memory of the elderly grandfather, by Barnaby's snobbery regarding non-Britons, the financially indebted Felix, . The hat is later spotted by a mysterious countess, who was involved in a deal with its true owner, and seen taking a sheet of paper from the hat and replacing it with money. Barnaby discards the hat, and it is passed around the members of the family until one of the nephews finds the money and keeps it. The hat's real owner later takes back his hat, returning to England without being apprehended by Von Doppelslich.

== Characters and cast ==
- Barnaby Bounce – Thomas German Reed
- Felix Flitter, Barnaby's nephew – Thomas German Reed
- Phoeble Bounce, Barnaby's nephew – Thomas German Reed
- Grandfather – John Parry
- Herr Von Doppelslich – John Parry
- Landlady – Priscilla German Reed
- Cherry Bounce, Barnaby's sister – Priscilla German Reed
- Countess – Priscilla German Reed
