= Fanny Brough =

British actress (1852–1914)

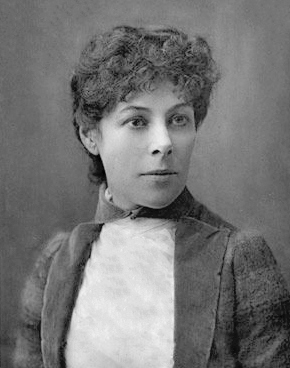
- Fanny Brough in the 1880s
- Born: Frances "Fanny" Whiteside Brough; 7 July 1852; Paris, France
- Died: 30 November 1914 (aged 62); London, England
- Other names: Fanny Boleyn; Fanny Bull
- Occupation: Stage actress
- Spouse: Richard Smith Boleyn (née Bull)
- Father: Robert Barnabas Brough
- Relatives: Robert Brough (brother); William Brough (uncle); John Cargill Brough (uncle); Lionel Brough (uncle)

Signature
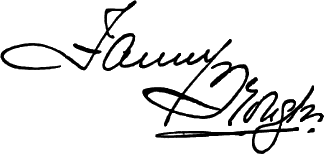

Frances Whiteside Brough (7 July 1852 – 30 November 1914) was a French-born British stage actress known for her many comedy roles performed over a four decade-long career.

Part of a literary and dramatic family, Brough was acting professionally in London by 1870. She played in a variety of comic and dramatic roles in Britain with several companies and toured America early in the 20th century with Charles Hawtrey. Her career reached a high point in 1902 with her creation of the title role of Kitty Warren in George Bernard Shaw's Mrs. Warren's Profession. She continued to act until shortly before her death.

== Early life and career ==
Brough was born in Paris, and baptised on 23 February 1853 at the Parish Church of St. Peter in Liverpool. She was the daughter of Robert Barnabas Brough, a noted journalist, poet and librettist who died a few days before her eighth birthday, and his wife Elizabeth (née Romer), an actress and a cousin of the soprano Emma Romer. Her father's brothers were the writer William Brough, the science writer John Cargill Brough and the actor-comedian Lionel Brough, cousins of the geologist Robert Brough Smyth. Her brother was the actor/manager Lionel Barnabas Brough (stage name Robert Brough). Her grandmother was the novelist Frances Brough.

Brough's professional stage debut came in 1869 with Charles Calvert's company at the Prince's Theatre in Manchester, where in March of the following year she played Ophelia opposite Barry Sullivan's prince in Hamlet. Her London debut came on 15 October 1870 at the St James's Theatre playing the title role in Southerland Edwards's adaptation of Sardou's Fernande. She then played with the Bancrofts in a revival of Money. Brough found success in 1878 as Mary Melrose in provincial road productions of Henry James Byron's Our Boys and as Norah Fitzgerald in Henry Hamilton's 1886 play Harvest staged at London's Princess's Theatre. Brough created the role of Petrella in The Passion Flower; or, Woman and the Law, a drama adapted from the Leopoldo Cano-y-Masas play La Pasionaria, which was originally produced in England as "The Woman and the Law" at the Theatre Royal in Hull on 28 July 1884 and at London's Olympic Theatre on 13 March 1885.

The publication Pen, Pencil, Baton and Mask wrote in an 1890 sketch of Brough,

Fond of the country and country pursuits, especially of driving, of which she 'can never have too much,' Fanny Brough finds her pretty home conveniently near London, while possessing many rural aspects. It is a large, old-fashioned house, within high walls, with some old trees in the still more old-fashioned garden. There is a great double hall opening out into several rooms. Her own special ' den ' is simply but artistically furnished, and contains many little treasures. There is a picture standing on an easel, by which she sets great store. It was sent to her by the Spanish author of the play The Woman and the Law, together with a letter of hearty congratulations and thanks on her brilliant creation of Petrella in that piece.

But, with all her excessive love of mirth, Fanny Brough can look as severe as a judge when occasion demands. In early days some juvenile actor would now and then mischievously declare, 'I'm going to make you laugh to-night,' but it was no use. The merriment springs from within, and her face would be set as immovably as the Sphinx; but she remarks, "My sense of humour has served me in glorious stead throughout my whole life, and I should die if I could not laugh."

== Marriage and later years ==
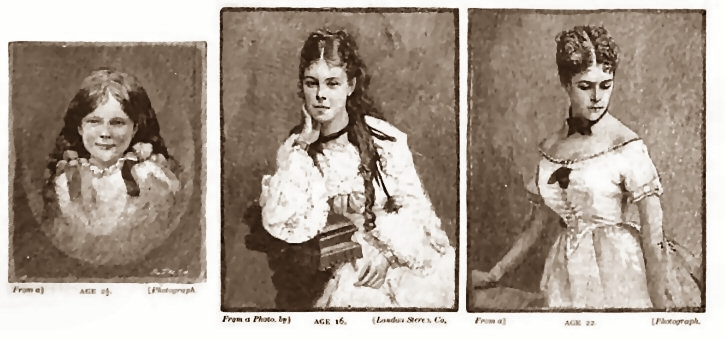
Fanny Brough, ages 2½, 16 and 22, Strand Magazine, 1892

In the summer of 1878, in London, Brough married Richard Smith Bull, an actor and stage manager who went by the nom de théâtre, Richard Smith Boleyn. In 1891, Brough became the first president of the Theatrical Ladies' Guild, an organization created to help destitute actresses who were about to become mothers.

Brough played the Irish servant, Mary O’Brien, in the hit play The Real Little Lord Fauntleroy, from the book by Frances Hodgson Burnett, which opened on 23 February 1888 at the Prince of Wales Theatre. Throughout much of the 1880s and into the 1890s, Brough toured in road productions headed by Kyrle Bellew and Cora Urquhart Brown-Potter. She played Lady Markby in one of Oscar Wilde's last plays, An Ideal Husband, which opened on 3 January 1895 at the Haymarket Theatre in London.

In 1891 the actress Kittie Carson founded The Theatrical Ladies Guild, whose purpose was to loan clothes and give other aid to actresses who became pregnant and lost their jobs. Brough was the guild's first president. The group raised and distributed money and arranged for medical services and the loan and creation of mothers' and children's clothing, including by running weekly sewing bees.

In 1902 Brough created the role of Kitty Warren in Shaw's Mrs Warren's Profession, and the following year she toured in America with Charles Hawtrey in productions of F. Anstey's The Man from Blankley's and The Saucy Sally by F. C. Burnand. Two years later she produced and played the lead in R. V. Harcourt's 1905 comedy, An Angle Unawares, which opened in London at Terry's Theatre on 12 September. She may have concluded her career in the latter part of 1913 playing O'Mara, a role she is said to have performed with vibrant, infectious humour in a Drury Lane Theatre production of Cecil Raleigh and Henry Hamilton's comedy, Sealed Orders.

Brough died in London in 1914, aged 62.
