= Henrietta Hodson =

English actress and theatre manager (1841–1910)

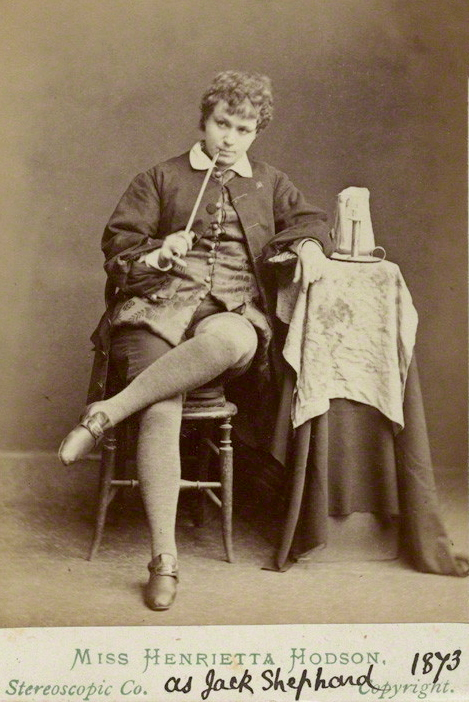
Hodson as Dick Wastrell (mislabelled) in Old London, an adaptation of Jack Sheppard, 1873

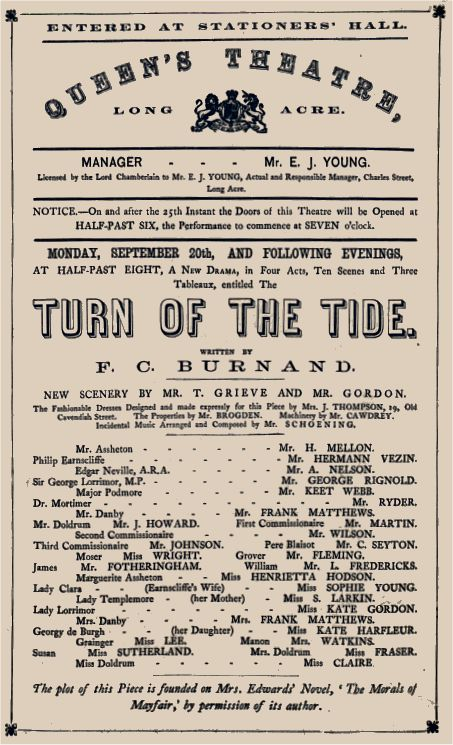
1869 programme featuring Hodson

Henrietta Ellen Hodson (26 March 1841 – 30 October 1910) was an English actress and theatre manager best known for her portrayal of comedy roles in the Victorian era. She had a long affair with the journalist-turned-politician Henry Labouchère, later marrying him.

== Biography ==
Hodson was born at Upper Marsh, Lambeth in Surrey in the ecclesiastical parish of St Mary-at-Lambeth. She was the eldest daughter of George Alfred Hodson (1822–1869), an Irish-born comedian, singer and innkeeper, and Henrietta Elizabeth Noel, an actress and singer. Her two sisters, Kate (later Mrs Charles Henry Fenton, but known on stage as Kate Gordon) and Sylvia (Mrs J. Stripling Blythe), were also actresses. Hodson's cousin was the theatre producer George Musgrove.

=== Early career ===
Hodson made her first professional stage appearance at the Theatre Royal, Glasgow, in 1858. In 1860, she and Henry Irving worked together in Manchester in The Spy; or, A Government Appointment. She joined J. H. Chute's Bath and Bristol companies in 1861 and built a reputation as a popular soubrette and burlesque actress. An 1883 New York Times article calls her "the cleverest Aladdin in H. J. Byron's piece I remember to have seen." In 1863, at the Theatre Royal in Bath, England, she played the role of Oberon in A Midsummer Night's Dream under the management of Madge Robertson (later Mrs Kendal), who also starred in the play, and Ellen Terry. There she also played the title role in the burlesque Endymion. In 1864, she married Richard Walter Pigeon, a solicitor and widower from Bristol, England, who had several children, and left the stage. They had one child, George Walter Noel Pigeon, born in 1865. Hodson left her husband, amid rumours of abuse, and returned to acting, using her maiden name.

In 1866, Hodson made her London début at the Prince of Wales's Theatre under the management of Marie Wilton (later Lady Bancroft) and H. J. Byron, as Prometheus in Byron's Christmas show, Pandora's Box, or, The Young Spark and the Old Flame. In 1867, with Charles Wyndham, Irving, J. L. Toole, Lionel Brough and Terry, Hodson joined a new company at Queen's Theatre, Long Acre, and opened with Charles Reade's The Double Marriage, in which Hodson played the small role of Jacintha. About 1868, she moved in with Henry Labouchère, a member of parliament and later a journalist and playwright, who was one of the founders of Queen's Theatre, but they could not marry until years later when her first husband died. Other roles that season included Arabella Fotheringay in The First Night, Lucy in Byron's Dearer than Life and in the same author's The Lancashire Lass, and the title role in Oliver Twist. In addition to roles in other Byron pieces, she acted at Queen's in various extravaganzas and burlesques, including La Vivandière by W. S. Gilbert, The Stranger by Robert Reece, The Gnome King by William Brough, the successful The Turn of the Tide by F. C. Burnand, and Twixt Axe and Crown by Tom Taylor. She stayed with that company for three years.

=== Later years ===
In 1870, she managed the Royalty Theatre for a season, playing in many of its pieces. She starred in Reece's Whittington Junior and his Sensation Cat and other burlesques. Back at Queen's Theatre, she played Ariel in The Tempest and Imogen in Cymbeline. In 1871 she began to manage the Royalty again, starring there in The Honeymoon as Juliana. She instituted the innovation of using a hidden orchestra below the stage. Also in 1871, she played Lady Amaranth in John O'Keefe's Wild Oats, followed by such roles as Nydia the blind girl in John Oxenford's version of Lord Lytton's The Last Days of Pompeii (1872), Dick Wastrell in Old London, adapted from Les Chevaliers du Brouillard (1873; a French dramatisation of Jack Sheppard), and Jane Theobald in Gilbert's Ought We to Visit Her? (1874). During that play, she quarrelled with Gilbert, threatened him with legal action when he described the quarrel to others, and demanded a written apology, which she then made public.

In 1875 in Liverpool, Hodson created the title character of Clytie in Joseph Hatton's dramatisation of his novel of the same name. That year she also created the lead role of Eliza Smith in Arthur Sullivan's The Zoo in London. She repeated the role at the Olympic Theatre in 1876. In 1877, she became the leading actress with the Haymarket Theatre, then managed by John Baldwin Buckstone. There she played Cynisca in a revival of Gilbert's Pygmalion and Galatea. Gilbert did not wish to cast her, but under her contract with the Haymarket, she insisted on taking the role and again threatened legal action. The next Gilbert piece at the theatre was a revival of The Palace of Truth, and Hodson insisted on playing a different role than the one Gilbert and Buckstone wished. Buckstone gave the actress notice that she would not be needed the next season. Hodson blamed Gilbert and consulted her solicitor. When he told her that she had no case, she instead complained of Gilbert's "persecution" of her and criticised his demanding directing methods in a pamphlet-letter circulated among theatre professionals. Gilbert responded quickly with an open letter, setting forth a series of letters and references that showed inaccuracies in Hodson's statements. This was published on 27 May 1877 in The Era, along with Hodson's rebuttal. In the end, she did not appear in The Palace of Truth.

In 1878, Hodson returned to Queen's Theatre as Dolores, Countess Rysoor, in Labouchère's Fatherland, an adaptation of Victorien Sardou's Patrie!. She retired from acting soon afterwards and lived in comfort at Alexander Pope's Villa at Cross Deep Twickenham, near London, with Labouchère. However, in 1881, she tutored and mentored Lillie Langtry in her early stage work, and they appeared together in the comedy two-hander called A Fair Encounter. She accompanied Langtry to America the next year, although the two soon fell out, and Hodson returned to England.

In 1887, she finally married Labouchère, with whom she already had a daughter, Mary Dorothea (1884–1944). In 1903 Hodson and her husband moved to Villa Christina, near Florence, Italy. She died there at the age of 69. Her daughter, Mary Dorothea, married Carlo Emanuele Starabba, 2nd Marchese di Rudinì (the son of Antonio Starabba, Marchese di Rudinì, prime minister of Italy) in 1903, then the Prince Gyalma Odescalchi De Szerem, and finally Don Eugenio Ruspoli. Hodson and Labouchère are buried at the cemetery of San Miniato al Monte, Florence.

== Notes ==
- Ainger, Michael (2002). Gilbert and Sullivan – A Dual Biography. Oxford: Oxford University Press. ISBN 0-19-514769-3.
- Baker, H. B. The London Stage: Its History and Traditions from 1576 to 1888, 2 vols. (1889)
- Burnand, Francis. C. ed., The Catholic Who's Who and Yearbook (1908)
- Davies, A. and E. Kilmurray, Dictionary of British Portraiture, 4 vols. (1979–81)
- Hollingshead, John. Gaiety Chronicles (1898)
- Lee, Sidney, ed. (1912). "Hodson, Henrietta" . Dictionary of National Biography (2nd supplement). Vol. 2. London: Smith, Elder & Co.
- Obituary in the Daily Telegraph (1 November 1910)
- Scott, Clement. The drama of yesterday and today, 2 vols. (1899)
- The Story of My Life by Ellen Terry at Project Gutenberg (1908) London: Hutchinson & Co.;
- Thorold, A. L. Life of Henry Labouchere (1913)
