= Charles Zachary Barnett =

English librettist and playwright

Charles Zachary Barnett (c1813 – 1849) was an English librettist and playwright of Jewish descent notable for writing the libretti for two operas by his brother the composer John Barnett as well as for his early theatrical adaptations of the works of Charles Dickens.

He was the son of a Hungarian mother and Bernhard Beer, a Prussian Jew who changed his surname to Barnett on settling in England as a diamond merchant and jeweller. According to some he was a cousin of the composer Giacomo Meyerbeer. Charles Zachary Barnett was the younger brother of the composer John Barnett, for whom he wrote the libretti for two of his operas, Fair Rosamond (1837), in which he 'perversely reduced the story to the level of burlesque'; and Farinelli (1839). He also wrote several plays including early adaptations of the works of Charles Dickens, such as the three-act burletta Oliver Twist; Or, The Parish Boy's Progress, which opened at the Theatre Royal, Marylebone on 21 May 1838. It was only the second stage production of the work, as Dickens had not yet completed the novel. Barnett also wrote A Christmas Carol: Or, the Miser's Warning!, a two-act adaptation of A Christmas Carol first produced at the Surrey Theatre on 5 February 1844, just weeks after the publication of the novella.

Other plays written by Barnett include The Banks of Allan Water, or the Death of Fair Eleanor (1831), performed at the Pavilion Theatre at Mile End; and a drama based on the Rothschilds - The Rise of the Rothschildes: Or, The Honest Jew of Frankfort (1838). Other dramas from the pen of Barnett included The Drum of Fate or Sarah the Jewess (1838); The Minister's Dream or the Jew of Plymouth (1838); Linda; The Pearl of Savoy, adaptation of Rossi's libretto Linda di Chamounix; Victorine of Paris; Dominique, and Bohemians of Paris.
