= Robert Barnabas Brough =

English writer of poetry, novels, and plays

Robert Barnabas Brough (10 April 1828 – 26 June 1860) was an English writer. He wrote poetry, novels and plays and was a contributor to many periodicals.

== Life and work ==
Brough was born on 10 April 1828 in London, the son of Barnabas Brough (c. 1795–1854), a brewer and wine merchant, and the novelist and poet Frances née Whiteside. His brothers were William, also a playwright, John Cargill Brough (1834–1872), a science writer, and Lionel, a comic actor. The family moved to Pontypool in Monmouthshire, where his father ran a brewery and public house. His father was briefly kidnapped by the Chartists in 1839 and was a crown witness at the trial of the Chartist leader John Frost, which resulted in Frost's deportation to Australia. The family was ostracized and ruined financially as a result, and moved to Manchester in 1843, where Brough worked as a clerk in order to contribute to the family income.

In 1847, Brough established the Liverpool Lion, a comic periodical, writing satiric articles and drawings. He worked with his brother William to write a Victorian burlesque play, The Enchanted Isle, which was produced in Liverpool in 1848 before transferring to London. Moving to London, he wrote other successful burlesques including Medea (1856) and Masaniello (1857), as well as other collaborative productions with his brother William including The Sphinx (1849) and The Last Edition of Ivanhoe (1850).

Brough also wrote essays and poems for journals and newspapers, including for a period being the Brussels correspondent of the Sunday Times. Songs of the Governing Classes (1855), a book of radical poems, is his best-known work. In it, Brough critiqued the handling of the Crimean War and launched an attack on the upper classes through his satiric fictional portraits of aristocratic figures.

Brough also penned a parody of Edgar Allan Poe's "The Raven" called "The Vulture; An Ornithological Study" which was published in the December 1853 issue of Graham's Magazine, though he was not credited. The poem was later reprinted in William Evans Burton's Cyclopedia of Wit and Humor (1858), this time with his name attached. It was also published, however, a year earlier on the front page of the December 18, 1852 edition of The Carpet-Bag in Boston. In this earlier printing, it was also not credited, but this attribution to Brough is therefore uncertain. He also published much-praised translations of poetry, including those of Victor Hugo. In 1860 Robert Brough edited the magazine the Welcome Guest for John Maxwell, and was editor at the time of the first contribution by Mary Elizabeth Braddon.

In 1859 Brough published a short story entitled "Calmuck" in Charles Dickens' magazine Household Words. It was a thinly disguised account of William Holman Hunt's experience painting his picture The Hireling Shepherd and of his relations with his model Emma Watkins. Hunt wrote an outraged letter to Dickens, who claimed to be unaware that the story was based on real events.

Brough was a popular member of a "bohemian" circle of journalists, writers and playwrights. In 1857, together with his brothers, Brough was a founding member of the Savage Club. He helped support the families of deceased writers and numerous working-class causes through benefit performances.

He married actress Elizabeth Romer. They had three children including a daughter, Frances "Fanny" Whiteside Brough (1852–1914), an actress known for her portrayal of Kitty Warren in the 1905 staging of George Bernard Shaw's Mrs. Warren's Profession; and a son, Lionel Barnabas Brough (1857–1906), known professionally as Robert Brough, an actor-manager with a considerable career in Australia. Robert Barnabas Brough was also related to Robert Brough Smyth.

On 26 June 1860, Robert Brough died at 8 Boundary Street, Hulme, near Manchester, leaving his widow and three children with little money to support them. The Savage Club, with the help of five leading London theatres, arranged a benefit performance to establish a fund to support them, with Charles Dickens as a trustee.

== Selected works ==
- The Enchanted Isle; or, Raising the Wind (play), co-written with brother, William Brough, 1848
- A Cracker Bon-Bon for Christmas Parties, 1852
- The Vulture; An Ornithological Study, 1853
- The Moustache Movement (play), 1854
- Songs of the Governing Classes, 1855
- Beranger’s Songs of The Empire, The Peace, and the Restoration, 1856
- Crinoline (play), 1856
- Medea, or The Best of Mothers, with a Brute of Husband (play), 1856
- Masaniello; or, The Fish'oman of Naples (play), 1857
- The Life of Sir John Falstaff, 1858
- Ulf The Minstrel, 1859
