= German Reed Entertainments =

English theatre company

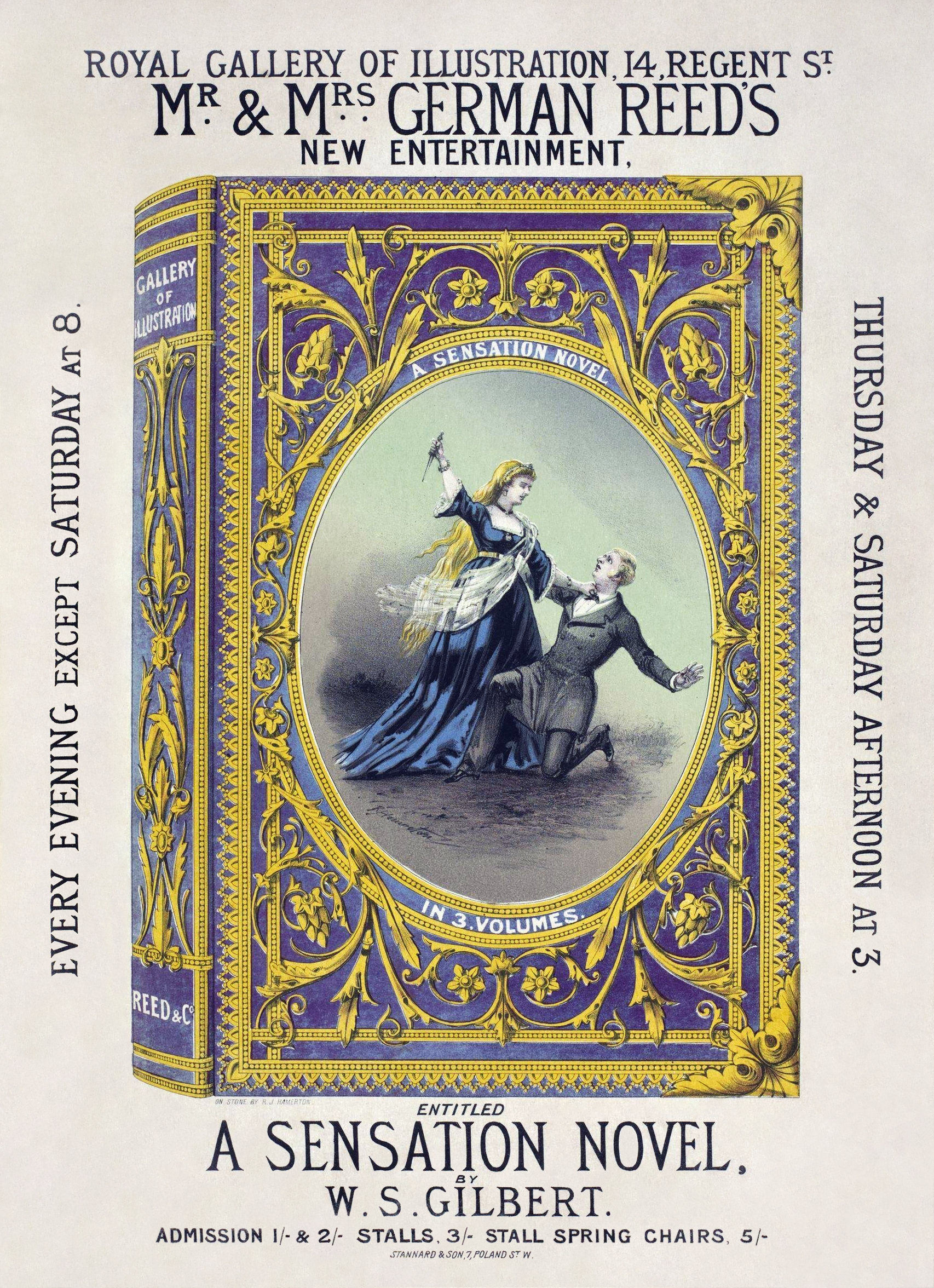
A Sensation Novel, 1871

The German Reed Entertainments were founded in 1855 and operated by Thomas German Reed (1817–1888) together with his wife, Priscilla German Reed (née Horton) (1818–1895). At a time when the theatre in London was seen as a disreputable place, the German Reed family provided family-friendly entertainments for forty years, showing that respectable theatre could be popular.

The entertainments were held at the intimate Royal Gallery of Illustration, Lower Regent Street, and later at St. George's Hall, Langham Place, in London. Thomas and Priscilla German Reed usually appeared in them, together with a small group of players. They engaged talented newcomers, such as Frederic Clay, W. S. Gilbert and Arthur Law, as well as established writers such as F. C. Burnand, to create many of the entertainments. Thomas German Reed composed the music for many of the entertainments himself.

== The German Reed theatrical revolution ==
This form of entertainment consisted of musical plays "of a refined nature". During the early Victorian era, visiting the theatre was considered distasteful to the respectable public. Shakespeare and classic British plays were presented, but the London stage became dominated by risque farces, burlesques and bad adaptations of French operettas. Jessie Bond wrote,

The stage was at a low ebb, Elizabethan glories and Georgian artificialities had alike faded into the past, stilted tragedy and vulgar farce were all the would-be playgoer had to choose from, and the theatre had become a place of evil repute to the righteous British householder.... A first effort to bridge the gap was made by the German Reed Entertainers....

The German Reed Entertainments became the first respectable venue for dramatic amusement to which the public could safely bring their children, presenting gentle, intelligent, comic musical entertainment. Their example showed that respectable theatre could be popular and encouraged successors such as Gilbert and Sullivan.

== Forty years of entertainments ==
=== Early years ===
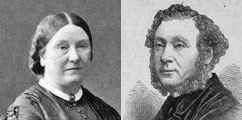
Priscilla and Thomas German Reed

In 1855, the first performance of "Miss P. Horton's Illustrative Gatherings", took place at St Martin's Hall, with Thomas playing the piano. Mrs Reed had been a popular performer of operetta, Shakespeare and other theatre pieces since the 1830s. The Reeds' entertainments consisted, at first, of character sketches and songs by the Reeds. In 1856, the entertainments moved to the more intimate Gallery of Illustration. These eventually became "Mr. and Mrs. German Reeds Entertainments". They called the establishment, euphemistically, the "Gallery of Illustration", rather than a theatre, the actors were "entertainers", and the pieces were called "entertainments" or "illustrations", eschewing the words "play", "extravaganza", "melodrama" or "burlesque". Reed himself composed the music for many of these pieces and often appeared in them, along with Mrs. German Reed. There was nothing else like this establishment in London, and the Gallery rapidly achieved popularity.

The Gallery was an intimate 500-seat theatre. The accompaniment consisted of piano at first, and later also a harmonium and sometimes a harp. At first, the entertainments utilized a cast of three; but by the mid-1860s, they had expanded to pieces with a cast of four. Often the pieces' plots involved mistaken identities and disguises. From 1860 to 1868, the German Reeds were assisted by John Orlando Parry, a pianist, mimic, parodist and humorous singer (one of George Grossmith's inspirations). He created a new type of musical and dramatic monologue that became popular. The earliest entertainments included Holly Lodge and The Enraged Musicians (1855); William Brough's A Month from Home and My Unfinished Opera (1857); The Pyramid by Shirley Brooks (1864); A Peculiar Family by Brough (1865); The Yachting Cruise by F. C. Burnand (1866); Our Quiet Chateau by Robert Reece (1867); and Inquire Within by Burnand (1868).

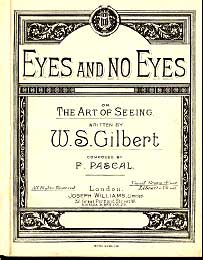
Gilbert's last German Reed Entertainment, 1875

As time went on, the Reeds added a dramatic pieces and brief comic operas designed for a small number of characters. Reed experimented with what he called opera di camera, small chamber operas by young composers. The German Reeds were able to attract fine young composers such as Molloy, Frederic Clay, Arthur Sullivan, Charles King Hall. and Alfred Cellier, the best scenic designers for their tiny stage, and the best young writers from Punch and Fun magazines.

=== Later years ===
The dramatist W. S. Gilbert wrote the librettos for six entertainments presented by the German Reeds from 1869 to 1875, some of them with music by Reed himself, including No Cards, Ages Ago, Our Island Home, A Sensation Novel, Happy Arcadia, and Eyes and No Eyes. Several of these pieces had ideas in embryonic form that would later re-appear in the Savoy Operas. Ages Ago, for instance, had a gallery of portraits that come to life, an idea re-used in Ruddigore. Mrs. German Reed's performances inspired Gilbert to create some of his famous contralto roles. German Reed also mounted the first professional production of Arthur Sullivan and F. C. Burnand's Cox and Box and commissioned a second opera from the pair, The Contrabandista. Given the German Reeds' role in both Gilbert's and Sullivan's first operatic successes, one wag commented that the Gilbert and Sullivan operas were "cradled among the Reeds."

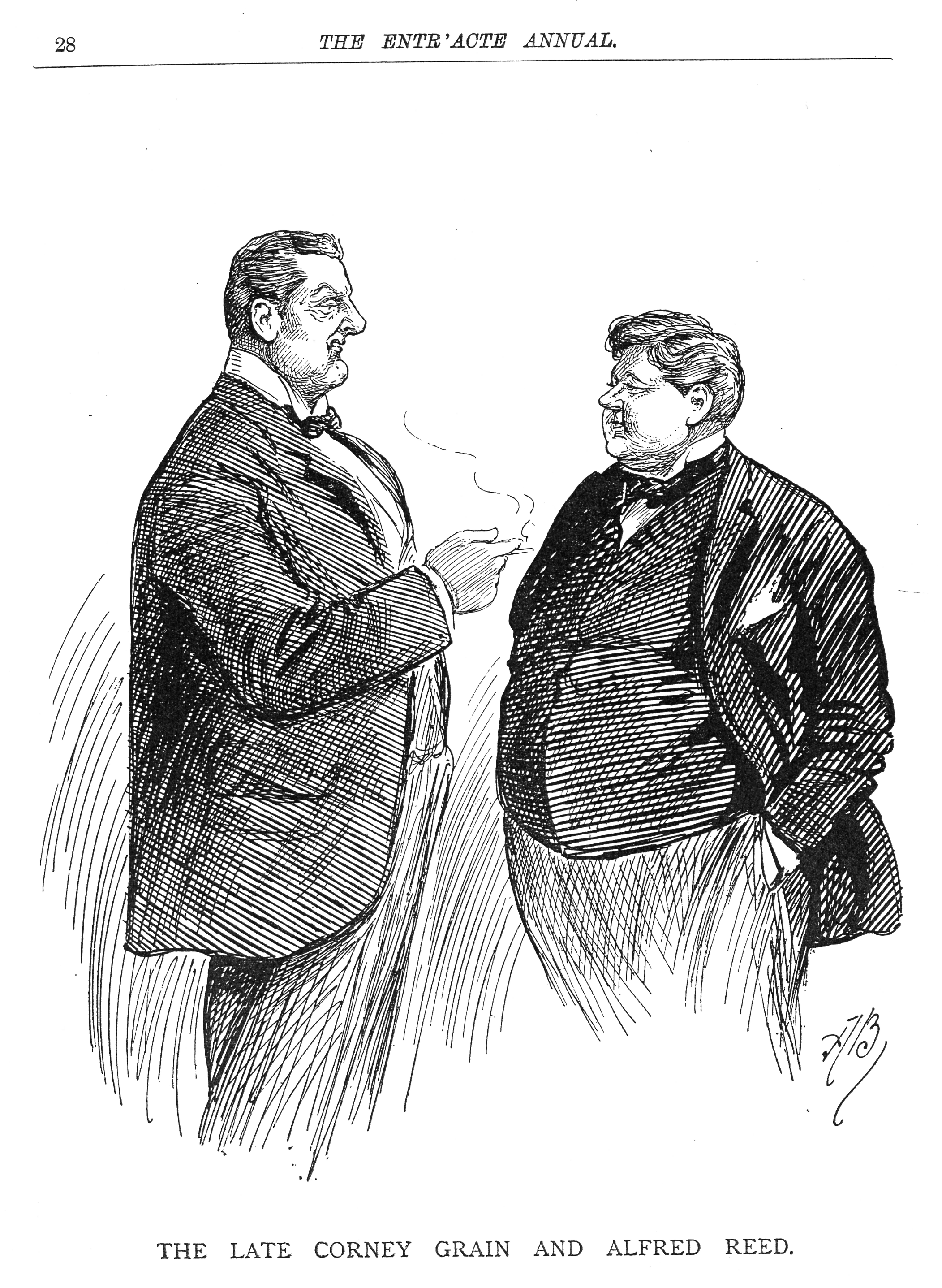
Corney Grain and Alfred Reed both died in 1895

Arthur Cecil joined the German Reeds in No Cards in 1869, remaining for five years. Fanny Holland first performed at the Gallery in 1869 in Ages Ago and appeared in scores of the entertainments continuously until 1895, except for two years at other theatres. In 1870, Richard Corney Grain, a clever, refined, and humorous society entertainer (a great friend and rival of Grossmith's), appeared in his first Gallery entertainment, Our Island Home, soon performing his own sketches, taking over where Parry had left off. He also remained with the German Reeds until 1895

Other German Reed entertainments included Our Quiet Chateau (1868) by Reece with music by Virginia Gabriel; Inquire Within (1868, Parry's last entertainment); Beggar My Neighbour (1870) and Number 204, by Burnand; Near Relations (1871) by Arthur Sketchley; King Christmas (1871, the first appearance by the German Reeds' son, Alfred); Charity Begins at Home (1872), with music by Alfred Cellier and words by B. C. Stephenson; My Aunt's Secret (1872); Very Catching (1872); Milord's Well (1873); Dora's Dream, with music by Alfred Cellier and words by Arthur Cecil (1873); Once in a Century by Gilbert à Beckett; In Possession; Babel and Bijouand; Back from India by Henry Pottinger Stephens; Our New Doll's House by W. Wye.

After the retirement of Thomas, in 1871 his son Alfred German Reed (1846-1895), also an actor, carried on the business in partnership with his mother and then with Grain. In 1874 they moved the entertainments to the St. George's Hall, Regent Street, and the German Reeds also took the entertainments on provincial tours. In 1874, Leonora Braham (who created several of the soprano heroine roles in the Savoy Operas in the 1880s) joined the German Reeds. Fanny Holland's husband Arthur Law also joined the company and wrote, as well as acted in, many of the entertainments. Some of Law's pieces for the Gallery included Enchantment, A Night Surprise, A Happy Bungalow (1877), Cherry Tree Farm (1881) and Nobody's Fault (1882), both with music by Hamilton Clarke, All at Sea (1881) and The Head of the Poll (1882), composed by Eaton Faning, which received good reviews.

Mrs German Reed retired in 1879. The deaths of Alfred German Reed and Grain, both in 1895, effectively ended the entertainments, although the name continued to be used by others for some years thereafter.
