= Barnabas Brough =

British merchant and accountant

- Born: c. 1795; Newcastle upon Tyne, England
- Died: 30 October 1854; Lambeth, London, England
- Other names: Bernard De Burgh
- Occupations: Brewer, Wine Merchant, Accountant and Writer
- Spouse: Frances “Fanny” Cargill Whiteside

Barnabas Brough (c. 1795 – 30 October 1854), was a British merchant and accountant who wrote several plays under the pen name, Bernard De Burgh. He is probably best remembered for being a chief witness in the treason trial against Chartist, John Frost, and as the father of four notable sons.

== Biography ==
Barnabas Brough was born around 1795 in Newcastle upon Tyne, the third of six children born to William and Mary (née Trotter) Brough.

Brough married Frances "Fanny" Cargill Whiteside on 9 July 1825 at St Marylebone Parish Church in London. The couple had three daughters and four sons. Their sons, William, Robert, John and Lionel, would all find success in the literary or performing arts. The actress Fanny Brough was a daughter of Robert Barnabas Brough.

Brough relocated to Pontypool, Monmouthshire in the early 1830s, where he would operate a brewery and sell wine to area merchants. On the evening of 4 November 1839, Brough and a colleague were returning home from their rounds in Newport when they encountered a mob en route to free comrades being held by the authorities in Newport. The two were compelled at gunpoint to join the mob, but were released unharmed some hours later. The ensuing violence, known as the Newport Rising, was a chapter in the ongoing struggle between the British government and a group of reformists called Chartists. In 1847, Brough wrote of his confinement that night in his book, A Night with the Chartist.

The following year Brough testified in the treason trial against John Frost, a leader of the Welsh Chartist movement. This led to resentment by a number of his neighbors and, in time, his business interests suffered. Brough left Wales in 1843 and moved his family to Manchester, where he found work as an accountant and auctioneer. In 1845 Brough became an accountant in the office of the Illustrated London News, a position he would hold for the remainder of his life. As Barnard de Burgh, Brough wrote several plays including, Davy Jones, or, The Welch Psalm Singer: a Gilpinic Tale and I Won't Go, or, How to Keep a Place: a Dramatic Sketch in One Act.

Brough died in Lambeth, London in 1854, aged 59 and was buried at West Norwood Cemetery. He was survived by his wife Frances and their seven children. As Frances Whiteside, Brough's wife wrote a number of stories and poems. In an 1860 edition of The Welcome Guest, published by her son Robert, she contributed two stories and the long poem, Karl the Martyr.
