= Pygmalion; or, The Statue Fair =

1867 play by William Brough

Pygmalion; or, The Statue Fair is a play by William Brough that was advertised as a farcical musical burlesque. It was first produced in 1867, and revived in March 1872.

Described as having a complex plot that largely involves changing social status through matrimony, the story revolves around a young sculptor, Pygmalion, who creates a young lady out of marble and falls in love with her. She is then brought to life through the divine intervention of the Greek Goddess, Aphrodite. All this is true to the original tale narrated by the fictional hero Orpheus as recorded by Ovid in Book X of his Metamorphoses.

Unlike the Greek story, which narrative is brief and ambiguous, the living statue has no heart and cannot return the love of Pygmalion, which causes a good amount of drama in the play. Eventually Psyche gives one to her.
