= Gaiety Theatre, Sydney =

Gaiety Theatre, Sydney in 1882

The Gaiety Theatre was an entertainment venue in Sydney, Australia from 1880 to 1900 and then a boxing stadium until 1912.

== History ==
The Guild Hall in Castlereagh Street, Sydney, was leased by John Solomon and L. M. Bayless in 1880, refurbished as a comedy theatre seating 1500 and renamed "Gaiety Theatre". Bayless was a sub-lessee.

It was the home of Arthur Garner's London Comedy Company for one season, starring Fred Marshall.

A notable programme was that in 1888 provided by volunteer performers to benefit the victims of the Bombo disaster. Rosa Towers made her first performance there since 1884, when she and her parents made their farewell performance prior to their tour of India, where both died.

In 1900 it became the Gaiety Athletic Club, (a boxing stadium), managed by Charlie Marshall.

In 1912 the building was purchased by the Catholic Club Land and Building Company and it became the Catholic Club.
