= Edward Saker =

British actor-manager

- Born: 30 September 1838; Bethnal Green, London, England
- Died: 29 March 1883 (aged 44)
- Occupation: Actor-manager
- Spouse: Emily O'Brien (m. 1874)
- Parent: William Saker

Edward Sloman Saker (30 September 1838 – 29 March 1883) was a British actor-manager. He was assisted in all things by his wife Emily Saker.

== Life ==
Saker was born in Bethnal Green in London, son of William Saker, a well-known low comedian at London minor theatres and later a tobacconist and news-vendor. Edward's elder brother Horatio Saker (1824–1861) also became an actor.

He was placed with a firm of architects, but early showed a strong taste for a theatrical career, which he adopted when about twenty-five years of age.

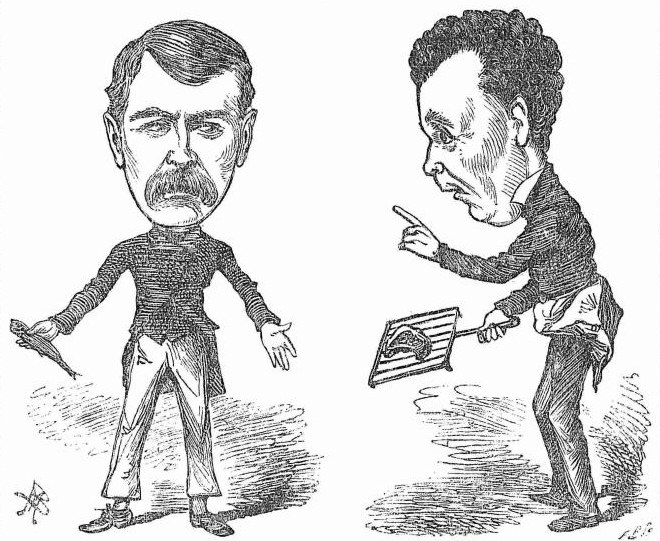
Edward Saker and Lionel Brough in Box and Cox, caricatured in 1883

In 1857 he joined a theatre company in Edinburgh, then under the management of Robert Henry Wyndham, his brother-in-law. He learnt his profession here, and soon became a useful member of the company; he was also treasurer of the company for several years. He made a tour in Scotland with Henry Irving, when the latter played Robert Macaire (in Charles Selby's play of that name) to Saker's Jacques Strop. With Lionel Brough he also gave an entertainment, under the name of The So-Amuse Twins.

He first attempted management during a summer season in 1862, when he rented the Edinburgh Royal from Wyndham, and opened with The Lady of the Lake. In 1865 he moved to Liverpool, and after two years there as an actor he became manager of the Alexandra Theatre in December 1867, and remained as manager until his death on 29 March 1883.

On 16 February 1874 he married Emily O'Brien (1847–1912), an actress who had joined the company of the Alexandra Theatre in 1872. Her stage name was Marie O'Berne, and she was known as a comedian. After their marriage, they first appeared together at the Alexandra in Thomas Morton's farce A Roland for an Oliver, opening on 2 March 1874.

As an actor Saker was most successful in parts requiring drollery and facial expression. His Shakespearean clowns were notable examples of low-comedy acting. However, he made his chief reputation as a manager. His period of management at the Alexandra, Liverpool, was rendered notable by a series of revivals of Shakespearean plays, including The Winter's Tale, Much Ado about Nothing, A Midsummer Night's Dream and The Comedy of Errors In all his undertakings he was ably assisted by his wife, who survived him.
