= Emma Romer =

British soprano, theatre manager and producer (1814–1868)

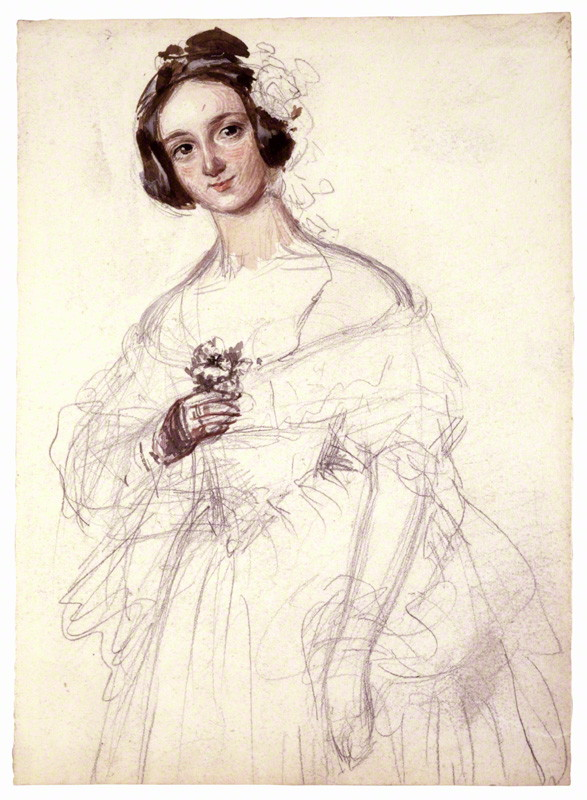
- A c. 1836 portrait that possibly depicts Romer
- Born: 1814
- Died: 11 April 1868 (aged 53–54); Margate, East Kent, England
- Occupations: Soprano; theatre manager; producer
- Years active: 1830–1863
- Spouse: George Almond (m. 1835; died 1863)

Emma Romer (1814 – 11 April 1868), later Emma Almond, was a leading British soprano of the 19th century and, for three years, a theatre manager and producer.

== Biography ==
Emma Romer was the daughter of John Romer and Elizabeth Cooper. The Romers were a theatrical family; "uncles! aunts! cousins! brothers! sisters! – all have 'smelt the lamp'", as a contemporary publication puts it. She was a pupil of James Elliot, and later of George Thomas Smart. (Note: According to the Dictionary of National Biography, she was taught by George Thomas Smart. Another source indicates she was first taught by a "Mr. Watson", then for a short period by Smart, and afterwards – Smart's fees being more than the family could afford – by Elliot.) Her debut theatrical appearance was announced at Covent Garden Theatre for 16 October 1830, when, as Clara in The Duenna, she exhibited a soprano voice of great volume and compass, together with considerable dramatic talent. But the faultiness of her voice-production, and failure in the technique of her art, checked her immediate progress. The suggestion is that her talent – at least in her early years – was limited by the quality of her teachers.

In 1834, however, after appearing at Covent Garden as Zerlina in Fra Diavolo and Rosina in The Barber of Seville (for her benefit), Romer was engaged at the English Opera House, where she created the roles of Eolia in John Barnett's The Mountain Sylph and Zulima in Edward Loder's Nourjahad, under the management of Samuel James Arnold. In the winter, she returned to Covent Garden, where, in 1835, as Amina in La sonnambula, she "reached the topmost round of the ladder of fame", according to the Theatrical Observer. But she immediately afterwards declined a minor part and threw up her Covent Garden engagement. Subsequently, as Agnes in Der Freischütz and Liska in Der Vampyr (Lyceum, 1835), she won much admiration.

In September 1835, she married George Almond, an army contractor. After her marriage, now going as Emma Almond, she appeared at Covent Garden as Esmeralda in Quasimodo, a pasticcio from the great masters. The death of Maria Malibran in 1836 afforded her further opportunities, and she now filled the chief roles in English and Italian opera at Drury Lane, appearing in Fair Rosamond (1837), The Maid of Artois, La favorite, Robert le diable, The Bohemian Girl, Maritana, and many other works.

In 1852, she undertook the management of the Surrey Theatre, where, during three seasons, she brought out a series of operas in English. After the death of her husband, in 1863, Mrs. Almond retired from her profession, settling at Margate. She died there, aged 54, on 11 April 1868, and was buried in Brompton Cemetery.

== Critical appraisal ==
Romer is described as "one of the leading sopranos of her day in English opera", with a big voice of great compass, and was a general favourite of audiences.

== Family ==
Her brother, Frank Romer, was a composer, singing teacher and member of a publishing firm. He was a professor of music at Trinity College of Music in London. Her sister, Helen, was wife of Mark Lemon, the founding editor of both Punch and The Field. Ann Romer, the vocalist, who married William Brough, was Emma Romer's first cousin.
