= William Brough (writer) =

English writer

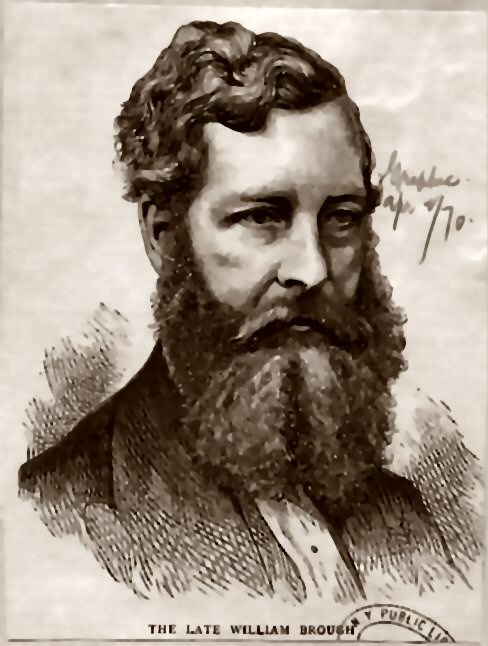
William Brough Graphic Magazine, April 1870

William Brough (28 April 1826 – 13 March 1870) was an English writer, chiefly in periodical publications. As a dramatist, he wrote some of the earliest German Reed Entertainments, as well as Victorian burlesques, farces and other pieces.

== Life and works ==
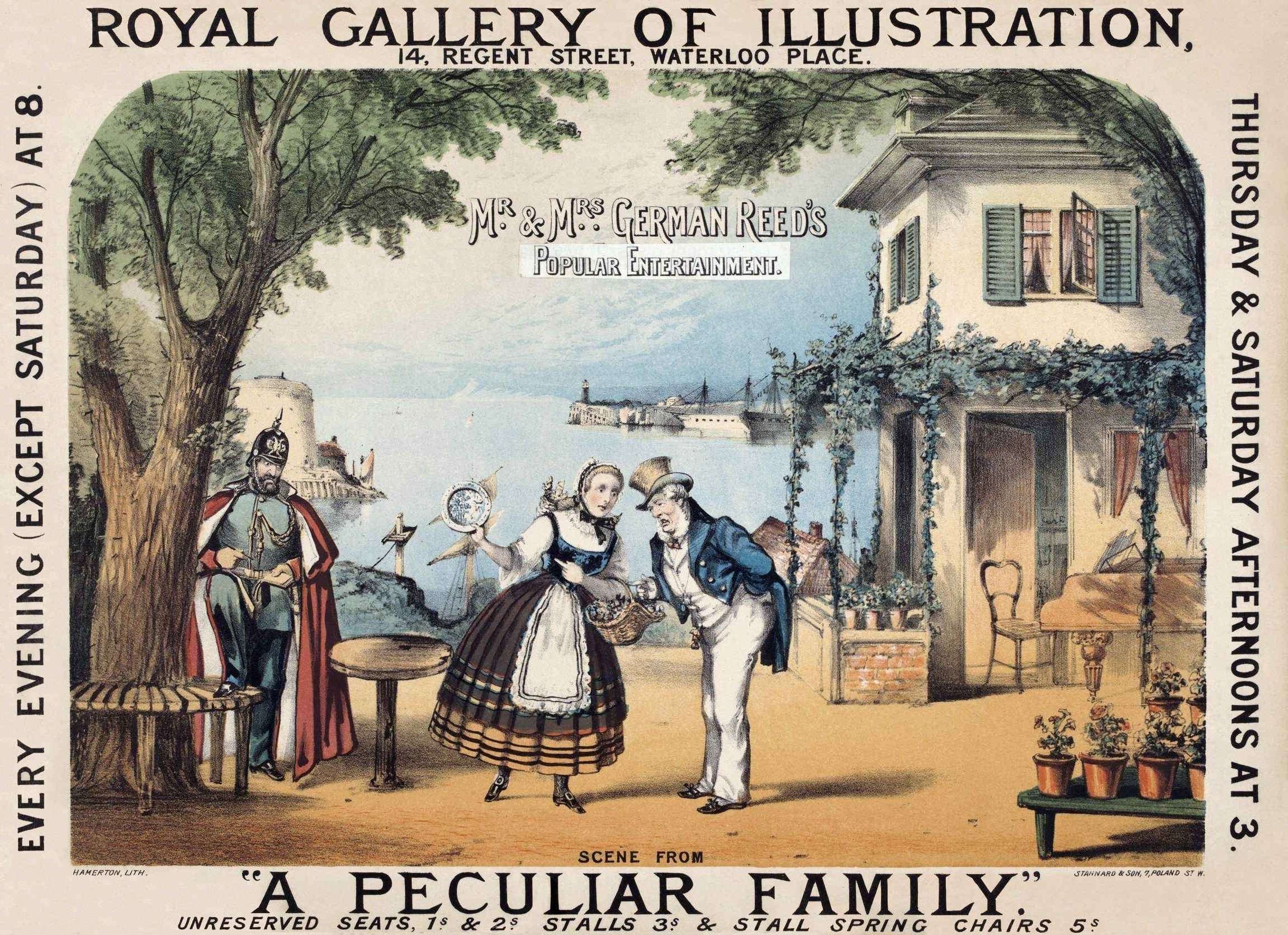
Poster for Brough's A Peculiar Family (1865)

Brough was born in London, the son of Barnabas Brough, a brewer, publican, wine merchant and later dramatist, and his wife Frances Whiteside, a poet and novelist. He was the brother of writer Robert (father of actress Fanny Brough), actor Lionel and science writer John Cargill Brough. His father was briefly kidnapped by the Chartists in 1839 and was a prosecution witness at the trial of the Chartist leader John Frost, which resulted in Frost's deportation to Australia. The family was ostracised and ruined financially as a result, and they moved to Manchester in 1843. Brough was educated at Newport, Monmouthshire, and apprenticed to a printer at Brecon.

To the Liverpool Lion, a venture of his brother Robert, whom he joined in Liverpool, Brough contributed his first literary effort, a series of papers called Hints upon Heraldry. Like his brother, whose reputation has overshadowed his own, Brough wrote in many periodical publications. His dramatic works, chiefly Victorian burlesques, were seen at many of the London theatres. These included Pygmalion; or, The Statue Fair and The Gnome King (1868) at the Queen's Theatre, Long Acre. In partnership with Andrew Halliday he wrote the Pretty Horsebreaker, the Census, the Area Belle, and several other farces. He also wrote some of the dramatic entertainments given by Mr. and Mrs. German Reed in the 1850s and 60s, with music composed or arranged by Thomas German Reed. They consisted of Holly Lodge and The Enraged Musician (both written with his brother Robert and staged by the German Reeds at St. Martin's Hall before being revived at the Gallery of Illustration), A Month from Home (1857), My Unfinished Opera (1857), Our Home Circuit (1859), Seaside Studies (1861), The Rival Composers (1861), The Bard and his Birthday (1864), and A Peculiar Family (1865).

With Madge Robinson and Samuel Phelps, he toured the provinces, stopping in 1866 at the Theatre Royal, Hull.

== Personal life; death ==
In 1857, together with his brothers, Brough was a founding member of the Savage Club. He married Ann Romer, the vocalist cousin of the opera singer Emma Romer. Ann died a year later, leaving him one child. He subsequently remarried, and died in 1870 at age 43, leaving a widow and six children. Brough was interred at London's Nunhead Cemetery.
