= John Barnett (composer) =

British composer

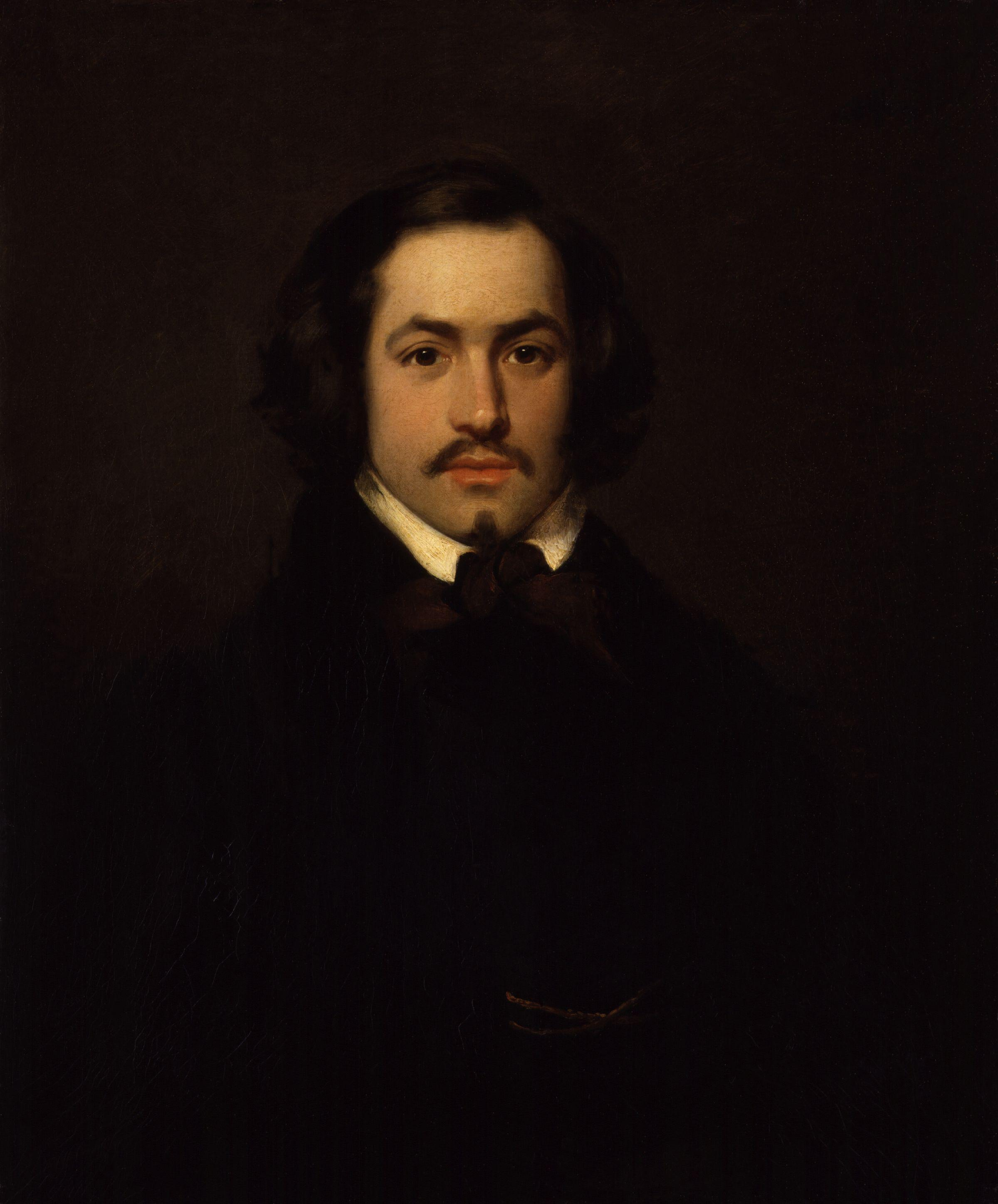
John Barnett painted by Charles Baugniet in 1839

John Barnett (15 July 1802 – 16 April 1890) was an English composer and writer on music.

== Life ==
Barnett was the eldest son of a Prussian Jew named Bernhard Beer, who changed his surname on settling in England as a jeweller. According to some he was a cousin of the composer Giacomo Meyerbeer. Barnett was born at Bedford, and at the age of eleven sang at the Lyceum Theatre stage in London. His good voice led to his being given a musical education, and he soon began writing songs and lighter pieces for the stage.

In 1834 he published a collection of Lyrical Illustrations of the Modern Poets. His opera The Mountain Sylph – with which his name is nowadays most associated – received a warm welcome when produced at the Lyceum on 25 August 1834, as the first modern English opera, and was given over 100 performances, which was an unusual success. It was followed by Fair Rosamond in 1837, and Farinelli in 1839, to librettos by his younger brother Charles Zachary Barnett, but Barnett never again achieved the success that he had enjoyed with The Mountain Sylph. Disappointed with his reception as a composer, Barnett retired to the country. He had a large connection as a singing-master at Cheltenham, and published Systems and Singing-masters (1842) and School for the Voice (1844). Barnett wrote several songs for the theatre with the actor, playwright and theatre manager John Baldwin Buckstone, and also some instrumental works, including three string quartets and a violin sonata.

Amongst his light music is a piece for Concertina and Piano called Spare Moments composed in 1859.

One of his daughters Clara Kathleen Barnett became a singer and composer; another daughter, a goddaughter of Franz Liszt, married the prolific author R. E. Francillon. His nephew John Francis Barnett (1837–1916) was also a composer.

Although The Mountain Sylph is all but forgotten, it inspired parts of Gilbert and Sullivan's 1882 Savoy Opera, Iolanthe.
