= Queen's Theatre, Long Acre =

Former theatre in London (1847–1878)

Queen's Theatre
- Interactive map of Queen's Theatre
- Former names: 1847 St Martin's Hall; 1850 St Martin's Music Hall; 1867 New Queen's Theatre; 1868 Queen's Theatre; Queen's Theatre of Varieties; 1877 National Theatre
- Address: Long Acre, Covent Garden; Camden, London
- Coordinates: 51°30′51″N 0°07′23″W
- Owner: John Hullah
- Capacity: 1850 3,000 seated 1867 4,000 seated
- Type: Lecture hall, concert rooms, Theatre, Variety theatre
- Current use: demolished; block of flats (on site)

Construction
- Rebuilt: 1862 unknown 1867 C. J. Phipps
- Years active: 1847–1878
- Architect: Richard Westmacott

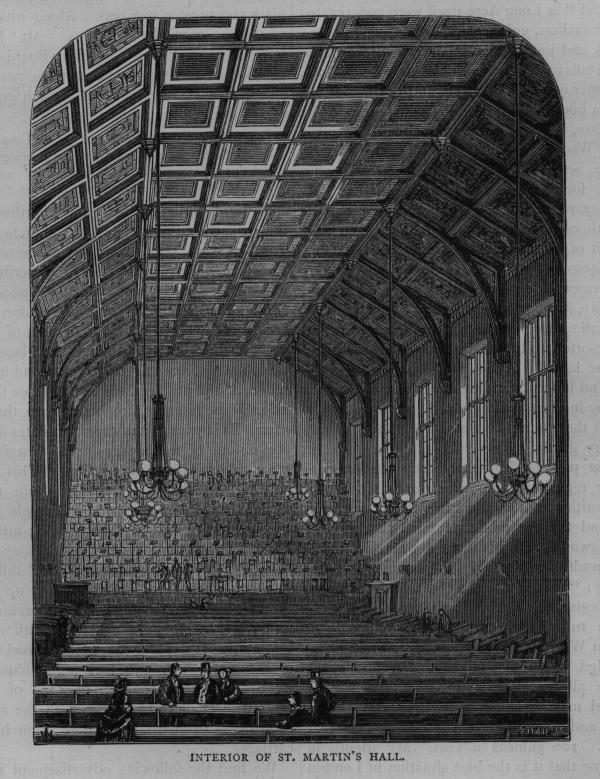
c.1850 print of the interior of St Martin's Hall

The Queen's Theatre was a London theatre established in 1867 on the site of St Martin's Hall, a large concert room that had opened in 1850. It stood on the corner of Long Acre (formerly Charles Street) and Endell Street, with entrances in Wilson Street and Long Acre. The site is within the modern Camden, part of Covent Garden.

St Martin's Hall contained a 3,000-seat main hall and a 500-seat lecture hall. It was used for musical recitals, lectures and political meetings. The Queen's Theatre, one of the largest in London, had a capacity of 4,000 seats. The theatre closed after barely more than a decade, in 1878.

The name Queen's Theatre has been used for other theatres in central London, including the Queen's Theatre, Dorset Garden (from 1685 to 1705), His Majesty's Theatre (from 1705 to 1714), Scala Theatre (during the period 1831–1865) and the Sondheim Theatre (1907–2019).

== History ==
=== St Martin's Hall ===
St Martin's Hall was built for John Hullah, in 1847, by William Cubitt, from a design by Richard Westmacott. The scheme was financed by subscription and it was built on a parallelogram of land, 149 feet (45.4 m) by 61 feet (18.6 m) wide, connected to a plot on Long Acre (44 feet (13.4 m) by 22 feet (6.7 m)); and consisted of a main hall with connected anterooms, galleries and a 500-seat lecture hall. It was built in the Elizabethan style, with a large domed iron roof. The music hall was capable of seating 3,000 persons and was opened in 1850 by Hullah, the founder of a new "school of choral harmony". In addition to his singing classes, Hullah directed oratorios and concerts, both instrumental and vocal, at the hall. The hall was then used for musical recitals, lectures and political meetings.

The German Reed Entertainments were initially presented here in 1855 – known as "Miss P. Horton's Illustrative Gatherings" – before moving to the more intimate Gallery of Illustration and later St George's Hall. Charles Dickens first appeared as a public lecturer in St Martin's Hall, in April, 1858, speaking on behalf of the Hospital for Sick Children, in Great Ormond Street. A week or two later, he spoke on his own account.

On 26 August 1860, a fire broke out in a nearby coach factory and the hall was destroyed, together with its organ. The hall was rebuilt as a concert hall, opening in 1862. The First International was founded in St Martin's Hall in 1864. The final musical entertainment was given in 1867.

=== Queen's theatre ===
In 1867, a 4,000-seat theatre was built within the shell of the existing building by C. J. Phipps for Henry Labouchère and his partners, with interior decoration by Albert Moore and Telbin. A new company of players was formed, including Charles Wyndham, Henry Irving, J. L. Toole, Lionel Brough, Ellen Terry and Henrietta Hodson. The theatre opened as the New Queen's Theatre, with a production of Charles Reade's The Double Marriage on 24 October 1867. An early success was Dearer Than Life, by H. J. Byron, with Brough, Toole, Wyndham, Hodson and Irving, coupled with W. S. Gilbert's La Vivandière, a burlesque of La fille du régiment. The theatre continued with melodrama, adaptions and classic revivals, dropping the epithet 'new' the following year.

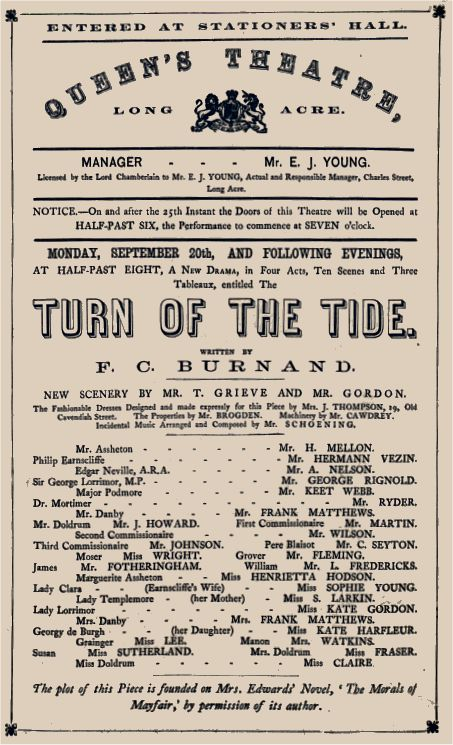
1869 programme

Initially, the management was run by the actor Alfred Wigan, who also appeared in its productions. By 1868, Hodson and Labouchère were living together out of wedlock, as they could not marry until her first husband finally died in 1887. Labouchère bought out his partners and used the theatre to showcase Hodson's talents. The theatre hosted comedies, such as F. C. Burnand's The Turn of the Tide (1869, starring Hermann Vezin and George Rignold with Hodson), historical dramas, such as Tom Taylor's Twixt Axe and Crown (1870), popular revivals of Shakespeare (starring such famous actors as Samuel Phelps) and Tommaso Salvini, dramatisations of Dickens novels, burlesques and extravaganzas. Although the theatre was among the largest and best equipped in London, and featured some of London's most famous stars, it lacked the guidance of an actor-manager of the stature of Henry Irving or Herbert Beerbohm Tree.

In 1877, the theatre became the National Theatre and hosted a series of promenade concerts under Riviere and Alfred Cellier followed by an ambitious dramatisation of The Last Days of Pompeii (Lord Lytton's eponymous novel) that was meant to feature a staged eruption of Vesuvius, an earthquake and a sybriatic Roman feast. However, the earth did not quake, the volcano did not erupt, acrobats fell onto the cast below, and the production was an expensive flop. The same year, the theatre was joined by overhead wires to the Canterbury Music Hall in Lambeth, and public demonstrations of the Cromwell Varley telephone were given. Several simple tunes were transmitted and emitted softly from a large drum-like apparatus suspended over the proscenium.

The theatre was open for little more than a decade, closing in April 1878. The interior was converted into a department store for the "Clerical Co-operative Society" and later occupied by the Odhams Press. The façade remained until redeveloped into a residential block in the 1970s.
