= John Cargill Brough =

- Born: 11 February 1834; Pontypool, Monmouthshire, Wales
- Died: 7 September 1872 (aged 38); Esher, England
- Occupation(s): Science writer, editor librarian and lecturer

John Cargill Brough (11 February 1834 – 7 September 1872) was a British science writer, lecturer, editor and librarian.

== Early life and career ==
Brough was born in Pontypool, Wales, the second youngest son of Barnabas Brough, a brewer, publican, wine merchant, accountant and later dramatist, and his wife Frances Whiteside, a poet and novelist. His brothers were writers William and Robert, and actor-comedian Lionel. In the aftermath of the 1839 Newport Rising, Brough's father, who was briefly detained by the rioters, testified in the treason trial against John Frost, a leader of the Welsh Chartist movement. This led to resentment by a number of his neighbours and, in time, his business interests suffered. He left Wales in 1843 and moved his family to Manchester, where he found work as an accountant and auctioneer.

In 1845 Brough's father secured an accounting position with The Illustrated London News, and the 11-year-old Brough was recruited to be his assistant. By this time he had developed an interest in science. At around the age of eighteen, Brough became a clerk in the audit office of the London and South Western Railway Company, where he eventually gained the positions of secretary and librarian for the railway's Literary and Scientific Institution. In this capacity, he first began giving lectures on basic chemistry and scientific topics. After the death of his father in 1854, Brough began to contribute to the care of his younger brother Lionel and sisters, Louisa and Frances.

Brough left his position with the railroad company in 1857 to write articles for literary and scientific publications, and in 1859 he published Fairy Tales of Science for young readers. The following year, he became editor of the publication Chemist and Druggist, a position he would hold for ten years. In 1857, together with his brothers, Brough was a founding member of the Savage Club.

== Later years ==
In 1864, Brough became editor of an edition of Cooley's Cyclopaedia of Practical Receipts, and around that time the self-trained chemist was elected a Fellow of the Chemical Society. In April 1867, Brough published the science journal Laboratory. While well received among chemists and scientists, the journal was unable to attract enough subscribers to be profitable. In 1869 Brough published, along with two friends, a humorous brochure entitled Exeter Change during a meeting of the British Association. The next year he was named Librarian and Superintendent of the London Institution in Finsbury Circus, where he became a popular lecturer on a number of scientific topics which included a course of holiday lectures on the philosophy of magic.

Brough and his wife, Mary Elizabeth, had two sons and a daughter and also adopted the son and daughter of his late sister, Frances Chilton. His eldest son, Bennett Hooper Brough (1860–1908), became a mining engineer, and his niece, Fanny Brough, was a popular actress.

Brough suffered from heart disease, most likely the result of a childhood attack of rheumatic fever, that forced him to curtail his workload as he entered his mid-thirties. He died in 1872 at Esher, aged 38 and was buried at West Norwood Cemetery. Friends and colleagues later raised £2,000 to help support his wife and children.
