= Fair Rosamond (opera) =

1837 English historical opera

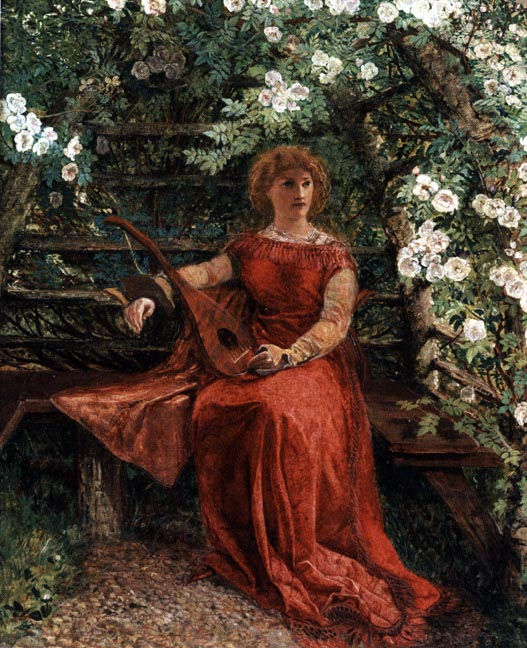
Fair Rosamund in Her Bower, by William Bell Scott, 1854

Fair Rosamond is an English historical opera in four acts composed by John Barnett, written in 1837 to a libretto by Charles Zachary Barnett, after the legend of Rosamund Clifford ("Fair Rosamond" or the "Rose of the World"), the 12th century mistress of King Henry II who was said to have been poisoned by the King's wife, Queen Eleanor. In his opera, Barnett effects a happier ending.

The premiere was February 28, 1837 at the Drury Lane Theater, London. It ran for 50 performances. Critics were generally appreciative of the composition and Barnett's attempts to build an English grand opera, but complained of slow pacing in the libretto.

== Synopsis ==
The scene is England, 1154-5. Act I opens in the home of Lord Clifford, who is with his daughter Rosamond, and her fiance Aubrey de Vere. They are paid a visit by a troubadour named Edgar, who is actually King Henry II in disguise. Lord Clifford is wary, de Vere is jealous, and Rosamond is entranced. Everyone dances. Rosamond runs off with Edgar.

As Act II opens, Queen Eleanor is singing a song of farewell to her native France ("The lily no longer my brow must bind"). Rosamond has fled with Henry to a woodsman's hut, where her father, de Vere, and others catch up with them. Everyone fights. At that moment, Queen Eleanor arrives with her guard. As she tries to calm the dispute, she questions Edgar, but does not recognize him as King Henry. "Edgar" suggests that the disputing parties submit their appeals to King Henry at a later date. Eleanor agrees.

Act III opens with a song of longing by de Vere, while all the parties gather for the coronation in Westminster. When Rosamond is introduced to the King, she recognizes him, and Eleanor suddenly realizes Henry is Edgar. Rosamond sings "Wild My Brain to Phrenzy Driven", and all parties take turns singing "Sounds of Discord Fill the Air".

Act IV takes place in Rosamond's Bower, which is not like the maze of legend, but is represented as a garden pavilion here. Rosamond and Henry take turns singing ballads of longing, there is an interlude for a ballet, and a five-part Madgrigal is sung ("Merrily Wake Music's Measure"). Henry has to leave for royal responsibilities, after which de Clifford, de Vere, and others arrive to beg Rosamond to leave before the Queen can harm her. The all leave to catch Henry to ask him to return to protect Rosamond. When they are gone, Queen Eleanor arrives and offers Rosamond a choice - death by dagger or death by poison. Rosamond begs for her life, and stalls, until suddenly the King appears. He has sharp words with Eleanor until Rosamond begs him to forgive the queen. "Her pardon, sire, let me implore - and then farewell, we meet no more". Henry agrees.

== Roles ==
- King Henry II, disguised as Edgar, a Troubador
- Walter, Lord de Clifford
- Eleanor of Aquitaine, Queen of England
- Rosamond, daughter of Lord de Clifford
- Sir Aubrey de Vere, betrothed to Rosamond

== Performances ==
There are no current records of modern performances at Operabase.com.
