= Charles Hall =

Charles Hall may refer to:

== Art ==
- Charles Winslow Hall (1860–1901), American artist
- Charles D. Hall (1888–1970), British-American art director and production designer

== Military ==
- Charles P. Hall (1886–1953), United States Army general
- Charles Piers Egerton Hall (1919–1944), RAF pilot and Stalag Luft III escape participant
- Charles B. Hall (1920–1971), U.S. Army Air Corps officer with the Tuskegee Airmen
- Charles Badger Hall (1844–1914), officer in the United States Army

== Music ==
- Charles Frederick Hall (1815–1874), English violinist and musical director
- Charles King Hall (1845–1895), English composer

== Politics ==
- Charles Hall (Lincolnshire MP) (fl. 1619–1669), English politician who sat in the House of Commons in 1654 and 1656
- Charles Hall (Lincoln MP) (1690–1743), MP for Lincoln, 1727–1734
- Sir Charles Hall (Holborn MP) (1843–1900), MP for Holborn, 1892–1900
- Charles Hall (New Zealand politician) (1843–1937), New Zealand politician
- Charles Hall (Wisconsin politician) (1847–1909), member of the Wisconsin State Assembly
- Charles Hall (Australian politician) (1851–1922), member of the Tasmanian Parliament

== Religion ==
- Charles Henry Hall (priest) (1763–1827), English Anglican churchman and academic
- Charles Francis Hall (bishop) (1908–1992), American Episcopal bishop of New Hampshire

== Science and technology ==
- Charles Hall (economist) (1740–1825), British economist, physician, and early socialist
- Charles Martin Hall (1863–1914), American chemist
- Charles A. Hall (1872–1965), English naturalist and Swedenborgian minister
- Charles A. S. Hall (born 1943), American systems ecologist

== Sports ==
- Charles Hall (cricketer, born 1842) (fl. 1842–1867), English cricketer
- Charles Hall (cricketer, born 1848) (1848–1931), English cricketer
- Charles Hall (American football) (1875–1945), American football coach in the United States
- Charles Hall (cricketer, born 1906) (1906–1976), English first-class cricketer
- Charles Hall (racing driver) (born 1979), British racing car driver

== Other ==
- Sir Charles Hall (judge) (1814–1883), English barrister and judge
- Charles Francis Hall (1821–1871), American explorer of the Arctic
- Charles E. Hall (1868–1952), American government official and statistician

== See also ==
- Charlie Hall (disambiguation)
- Chuck Hall (disambiguation)
- Charles Hall Dillon (1853–1929), House of Representatives member from South Dakota
- Charles Hall Grandgent (1862–1939), American philologist and scholar
