= Charles Henry Hall =

Charles Henry Hall may refer to:

- Charles Henry Hall (priest) (1763–1827), English churchman and academic
- Charles Hall (Australian politician) (1851–1922), member of the Tasmanian Parliament
- Charles Hall (cricketer, born 1906) (1906–1976), English cricketer

== See also ==
- Charles Hall (disambiguation)
- Charlie Hall (disambiguation)
