= St. George Hotel =

St. George Hotel or St. George's Hotel may refer to:

- St. George Hotel (Volcano, California), listed on the NRHP in California
- Hotel St. George, Brooklyn, New York
- Hotel St George, Wellington, New Zealand
- Saint Georges Hotel, London, England
- St. Georges Hotel, Beirut, Lebanon
- Hotel El-Djazaïr, formerly Hotel Saint-George, Algiers, Algeria
