= St. George's Hall, London =

Former theatre in Langham Place, London

Coordinates: 51°31′4″N 0°8′33″W

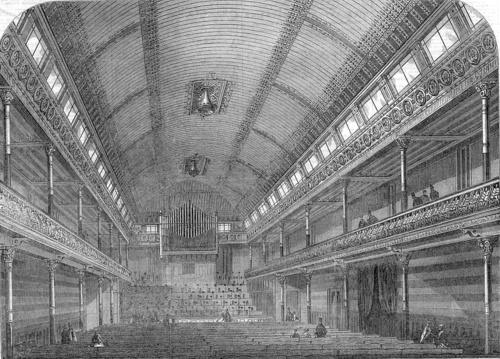
From Illustrated London News, 29 June 1867

St. George's Hall was a theatre located in Langham Place, off Regent Street in the West End of London. It was built in 1867 and closed in 1966. The hall could accommodate between 800 and 900 persons, or up to 1,500 persons including the galleries. The architect was John Taylor of Whitehall.

The hall was known for three decades for its presentation of the German Reed Entertainments alongside other musical works and lectures. After 1895, it was used for vaudeville, drama, magic shows, as the headquarters of the London Academy of Music, and even as a skating rink. In 1933, it became a BBC broadcasting studio but was shut down after extensive damage from bombing in March 1943. The theatre was demolished in 1966, and St George's Hotel (now called Treehouse Hotel London) and Henry Wood House now stand on the site.

== German Reed Entertainments and lectures ==
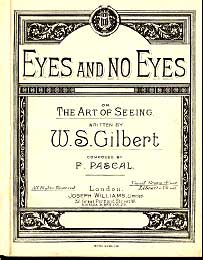
W. S. Gilbert's last German Reed Entertainment, 1875.

The hall was built as a concert hall for the New Philharmonic Society and opened on 24 April 1867. Rose Hersee and Madeline Schiller performed at the opening. The Hall could also be used as a theatre, and the first production at "St. George's Theatre" was A Woman's Whim by Walter Stephens on 3 December 1867.

Soon afterwards, the theatre was leased by Thomas German Reed, who initially produced and conducted The Contrabandista (a comic opera by Arthur Sullivan and F. C. Burnand), The Beggar's Opera and other English operas in small-scale productions. In 1874, Reed's wife, Priscilla German Reed, moved the German Reed Entertainments to St. George's Hall. Like their earlier theatre, the Gallery of Illustration, St. George's had a small stage, and musical works were presented with only piano and harmonium. Thomas retired in 1871, and his son Alfred continued to run the theatre with his mother until her retirement in 1879 and, beginning in 1877, in partnership with Richard Corney Grain, until both their deaths in 1895.

The pieces premiered there included W. S. Gilbert's farce, A Medical Man (1872) and his one-act comic opera, Eyes and No Eyes (1875). John Baldwin Buckstone wrote Married Life, and John Maddison Morton wrote Slasher and Crasher for the hall, both in 1872. In addition to performances, there were regular lectures in the hall, the Chartist Gerald Massey gave a series of lectures in 1872, on Christianity and Spiritualism. The theist Charles Voysey gave regular Sunday sermons from 1875, after his ejection from the established church. H. G. Wells described a visit to one tedious Sunday lecture in Incidental Thoughts on a Bald Head. When they were not presenting a piece at the hall, it was rented it out to amateurs or other entertainments.

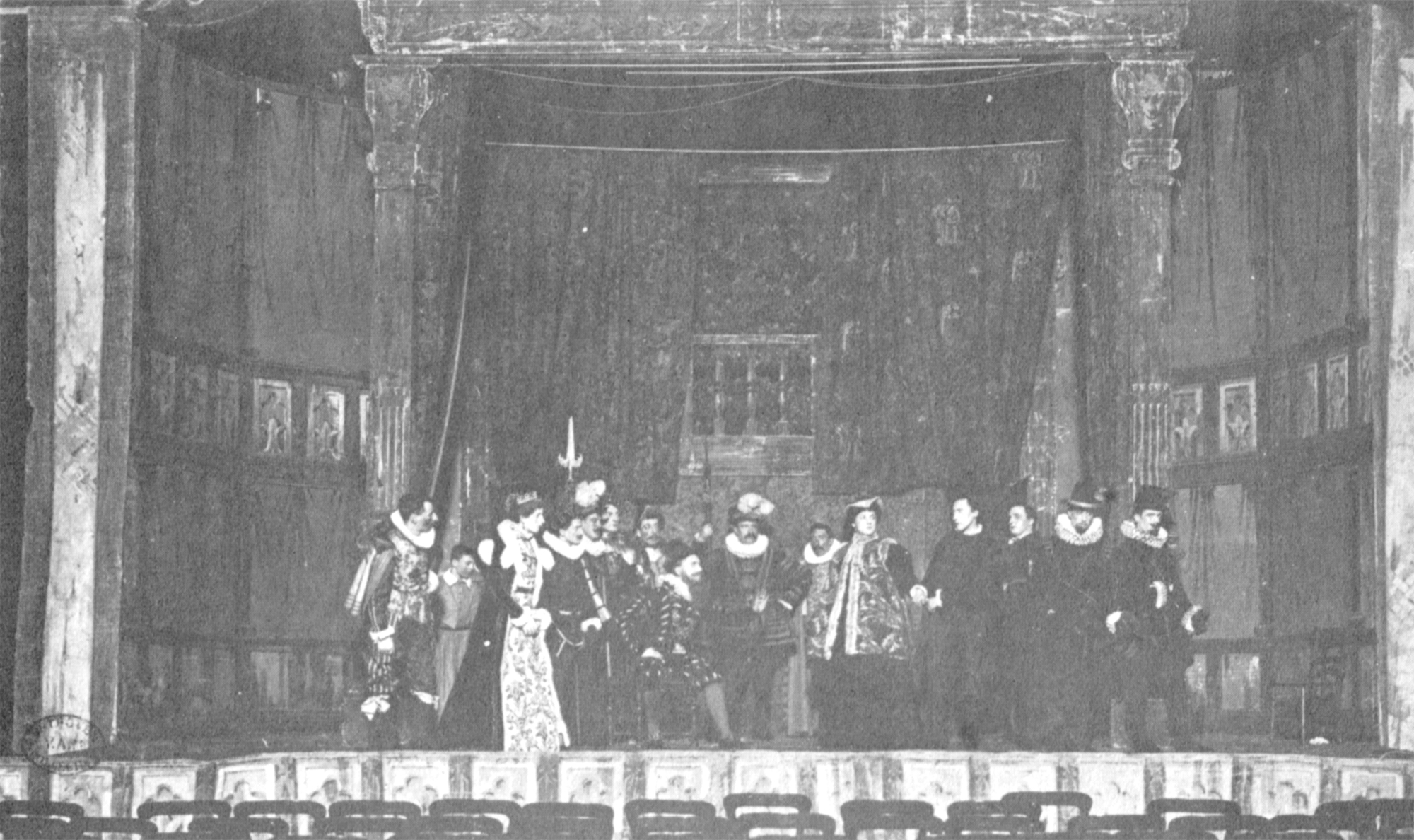
The court scene from William Poel's production of Hamlet in 1881

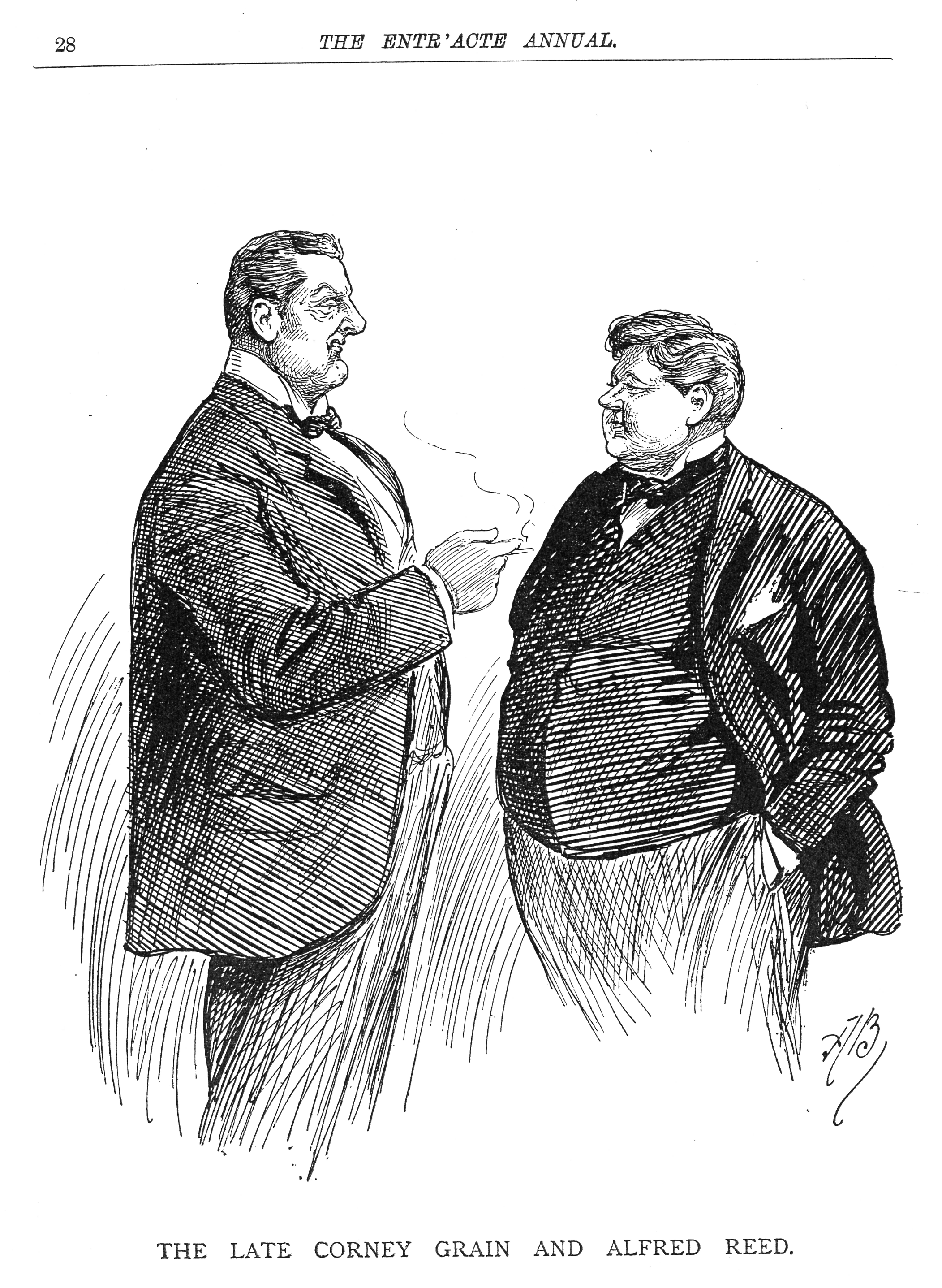
Richard Corney Grain and Alfred Reed, from the 1896 Entr'acte Annual

At the hall Gilbert Arthur à Beckett presented Two Foster Brothers, composed by Alfred Cellier (1877), and Once in a Century, with music by Vivian Bligh. Henry Pottinger Stephens wrote his first burlesque, Back from India for the hall in 1879, as well as Hobbies in 1885, with William Yardley and music by George Gear. Cherry Tree Farm and All at Sea played in 1881. The same year, William Poel produced his Hamlet. In the early 1880s, Eric Lewis sometimes substituted at the Hall for Corney Grain. Herbert Gardiner wrote A Night in Wales (1885) for the hall with music by Corney Grain. Alfred J. Caldicott wrote a number of pieces for the hall, including A Treasure Trove, A Moss Rose Rent (1883), Old Knockles (1884), In Cupid's Court (1885), The Friar (1886), Tally Ho (1887), Wanted, An Heir and The Boson's Mate (1888), John Smith (1889), The Old Bureau (1891), and An Old Pair (1893).

Fanny Holland starred in many of the entertainments, along with Mr. and Mrs. German Reed, their son Alfred, Holland's husband Arthur Law, Corney Grain, Arthur Cecil (all of whom also wrote for the hall) Carlotta Carrington and Leonora Braham, who made her professional stage debut in 1870 at the hall in a revival of Gilbert and Clay's Ages Ago, which was revived again there in 1874. Except for a brief stint at the Criterion Theatre in 1874 and at the Savoy Theatre in 1879-80, Holland starred at St. George's until 1895 in entertainments too numerous to name. Many of the entertainments were written by Law, including A Night Surprise (1877), Nobody's Fault, composed by Hamilton Clarke (1882), and A Happy Bungalow, with music by Charles King Hall. Other pieces from the 1870s starring Holland included Number 204 by F. C. Burnand, with music by Thomas German Reed; and Our New Doll's House by W. Wye, with music by Cotsford Dick.

== Later uses of the hall ==
After the German Reed Entertainments closed in 1895, the building changed its name to the Matinee Theatre, on 17 April 1897, presenting "high class vaudeville," but it was not very successful. A series of German plays were then produced, but in 1904 the hall closed.

In 1905, magician John Nevil Maskelyne renovated, expanded and reopened the 'St George's Hall, England's New Home of Mystery,' on 24 January 1905 with The Coming Race by David Christie Murray and Maskelyne. Maskelyne's entertainments were called Maskelyne's Theatre of Mystery. The theatre also hosted meetings of The Magic Circle, an association of amateur and professional magicians, and its members David Devant and Maskelyne continued to give magic shows for many years. One was called Maskelyne and Devant's Mysteries, which was presented in August 1910.

The hall was also used as a Bioscope Picture Palace, although with a reduced capacity of 500. The building also was used as the headquarters of the London Academy of Music. The hall was later converted to use as a skating rink.

St. George's was finally acquired by Eric Maschwitz for the BBC in 1933 for broadcasts of vaudeville, comedy and revue shows, and opened as a studio on 25 November 1933. The BBC installed the BBC Theatre Organ in 1936, a Compton Melotone and Electrostatic Organ, this enabled a wide range of sounds to be produced during performances. Reginald Foort was appointed resident organist.

The hall sustained extensive damage from bombing in September 1940, May 1941 (when the Queen's Hall across the road was destroyed) and March 1943. The BBC studios moved to the Aeolian Hall, in New Bond Street. The building was demolished in 1966, and together with the Queen's Hall site the location was used for the construction of the St George's Hotel (now called Treehouse Hotel London) and Henry Wood House.
