= King Hall =

King Hall may refer to

- UC Davis School of Law (King Hall)
- The mess hall at the United States Naval Academy
- Charles King Hall, British composer
- William King-Hall, British naval officer, father to George Fowler and Herbert King-Hall
  - Herbert King-Hall, British naval officer, younger brother of George Fowler King-Hall
  - Sir George Fowler King-Hall, British naval officer, father of Magdalen, Lou and Stephen King-Hall
    - Magdalen King-Hall, author and daughter of George Fowler King-Hall
    - Stephen King-Hall, British naval officer and politician, son of George Fowler King-Hall
