= George Madeira =

George David Madeira (October 1836 – January 1922) was an American mining engineer and mineralogist who founded the first astronomical observatory in California in the town of Volcano.

Madeira arrived with his family from Illinois in Volcano on August 30, 1852. They, like many others, had come in search of gold during the California Gold Rush. He had been interested in astronomy as a child, reporting to have observed a comet in February, 1843. Although his formal education had ended at age 15, he continued to study mathematics from a neighbor, a Methodist minister from British Columbia named Telerand.

In 1860, he set up a crude observatory consisting of his telescope (which he had delivered from San Francisco), and a heavy canvas and oilcloth covering. On October 18 of that year, the Sacramento Daily Union published a letter from him (under a pseudonym) regarding sunspot activity, the earliest recorded publication of astronomical research in California. On June 30, 1861, he observed a large and bright comet, which was later dubbed the Great Comet of 1861 (unbeknownst to him, it had already been discovered by Australian John Tebbutt over a month earlier, but news of the discovery had not reached the northern hemisphere yet). The family left Volcano for Carson City, Nevada in 1862 and Madeira sold his telescope to Josiah Whitney of the California Geological Survey.

In addition to his recorded observations, Madeira made another important contribution to astronomy. He was a paid lecturer even as a young man, taking his telescope around the state. After one such lecture in 1860 in San Jose attended by James Lick, he and Lick spent the next few nights observing the skies at Lick's estate. At one point, Madeira told Lick, "If I had your wealth, Mr. Lick, I'd build the world's largest telescope on top of that mountain," pointing out a spot where the present Lick Observatory sits. Although he was not the only influence, he was probably the first to suggest to Lick the idea of a large telescope.

Madeira went on to a varied career as a mining geologist, mineralogist (he was Curator of the California mineral exhibit at the 1904 World's Fair in St. Louis, Missouri), journalist, prospector, and mining consultant. He never lost his interest in astronomy and he wrote many articles on aspects of astronomy for the newspapers he worked at. At one point, he applied for a position at Lick Observatory when it opened, but in this he was not successful.
