= Volcano, California =

Volcano
- census-designated place
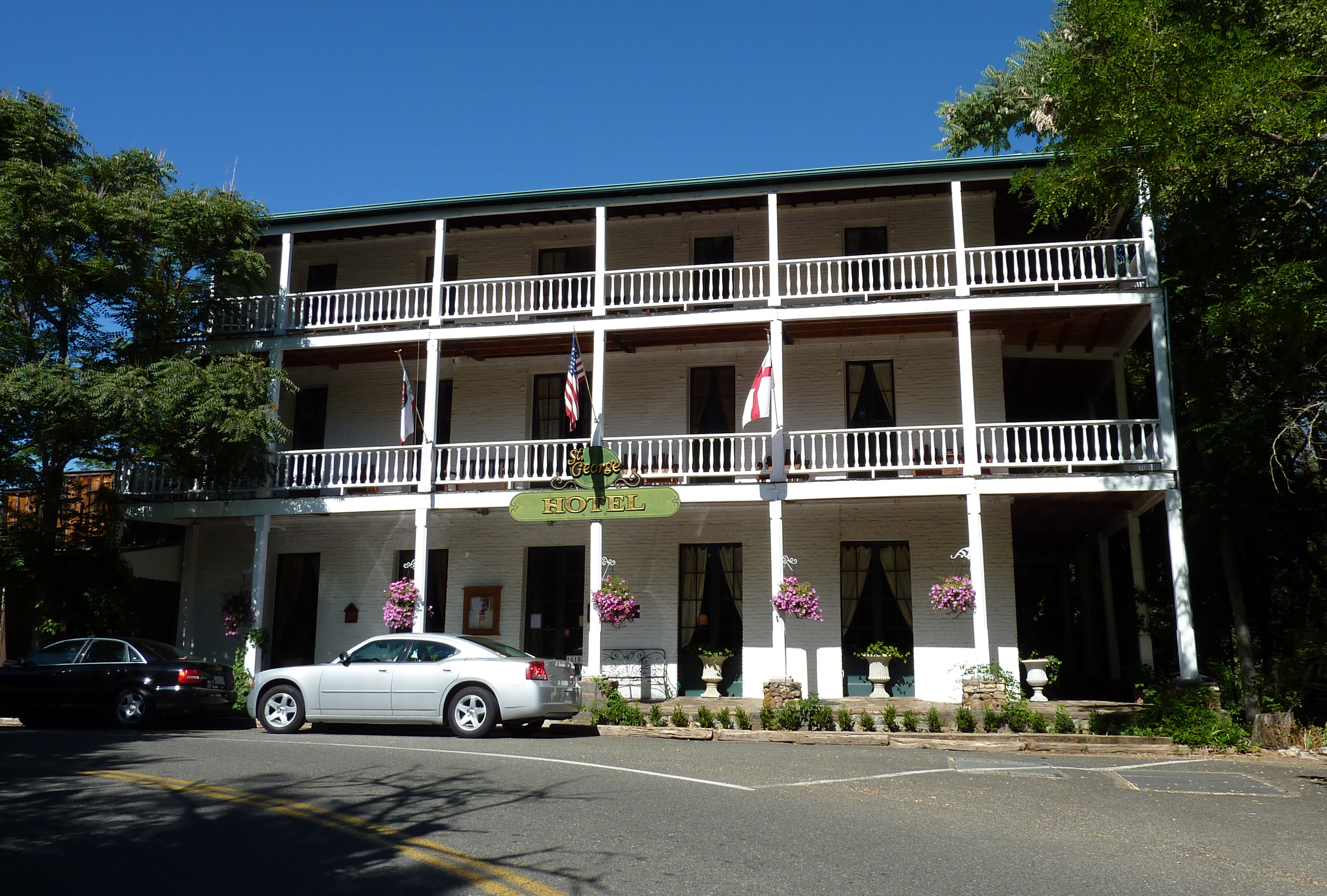
- The landmark St. George Hotel in Volcano

- Location in California
- Coordinates: 38°26′35″N 120°37′51″W
- Country: United States
- State: California
- County: Amador

Area
  - Total: 1.400 sq mi (3.627 km^{2})
  - Land: 1.400 sq mi (3.627 km^{2})
  - Water: 0 sq mi (0 km^{2}) 0%
- Elevation: 2,070 ft (631 m)

Population (2020)
  - Total: 104
  - Density: 74.3/sq mi (28.7/km^{2})
- ZIP Code: 95689
- Area code: 209
- GNIS feature ID: 237127, 2583178
- Website

California Historical Landmark
- Reference no.: 29

Volcano (formerly Soldier's Gulch and The Volcano) is a census-designated place in Amador County, California, United States. It lies at an elevation of 2,070 feet (631 m). The population was 104 at the 2020 census. It is located at 38°26′35″N 120°37′51″W, just north of Pine Grove. The town is registered as a California Historical Landmark. The community is in ZIP code 95689 and is served by area code 209.

== History ==
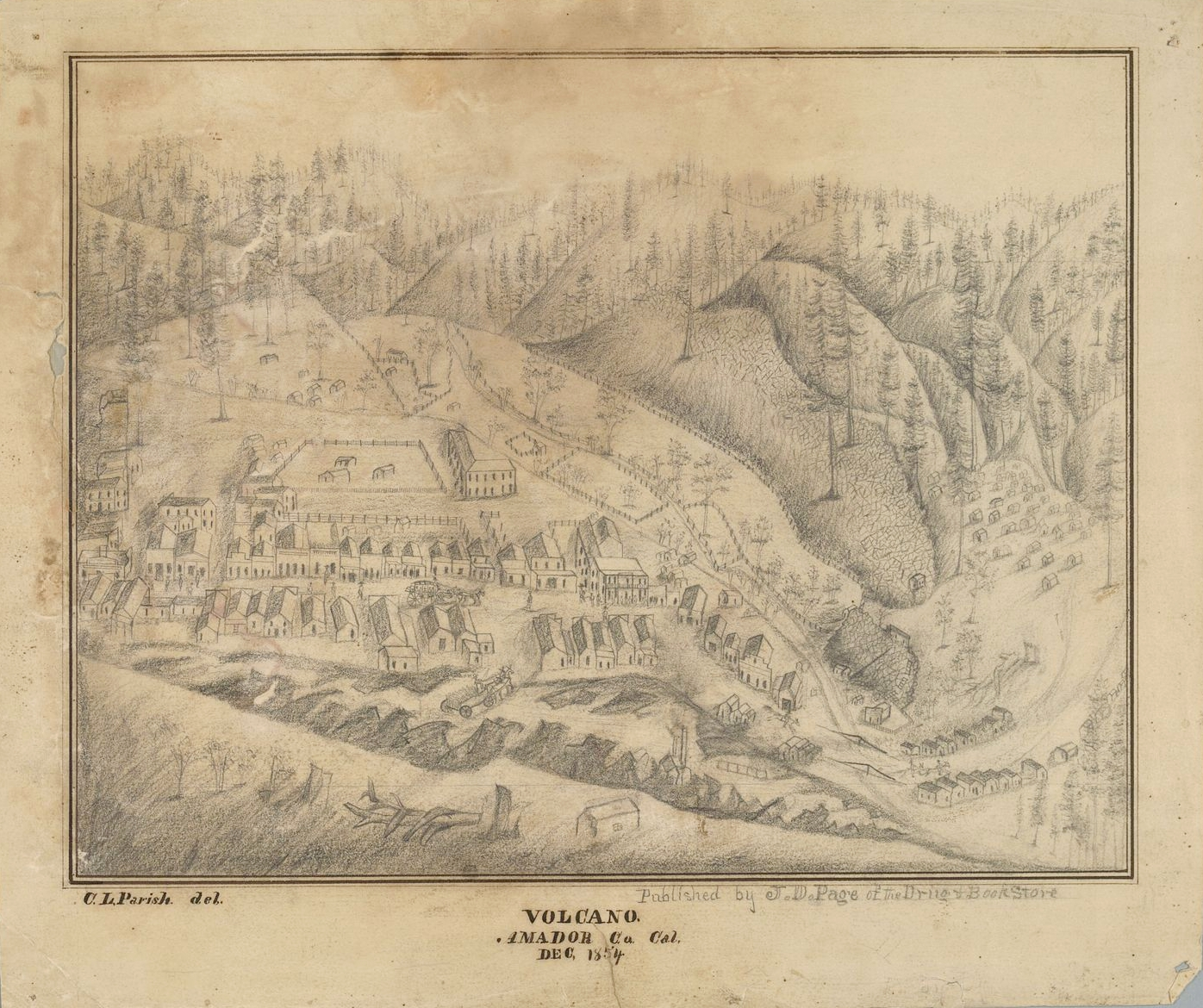
Pencil and ink drawing of Volcano, 1854

The town is named for its setting in a bowl-shaped valley which early gold miners thought was caused by a volcano. Early-morning fog rising from the valley floor only reinforced that belief. The area was first designated by Colonel Stevenson's men, who mined Soldiers Gulch in 1849. In 1851 a post office was established and by April 1852 there were 300 houses. By 1853 the flats and gulches swarmed with men, and there were 11 stores, six hotels, three bakeries, and three saloons. Hydraulic mining operations, begun in 1855, brought thousands of fortune seekers to form a town of 17 hotels, a library, a theater, and courts of quick justice.

During the Civil War, Volcano's gold served the Union. The "Volcano Blues" smuggled the 800 lb (360 kg) cannon "Old Abe," into the town by hearse, to intimidate rebel sympathizers. The cannon was cast by Cyrus Alger & Co. in Boston in 1837 and is the first of two six-pounders made on the same day to be stamped with serial number 4. The other cannon still survives at Shiloh Battlefield and is called "Shiloh Sam". "Old Abe" was only fired once during the Civil War. The Confederate faction known as Knights of the Golden Circle owned many of the Main Street businesses. "Old Abe" was fired down Main Street, causing windows to break in all the shops that had not been warned – the ones sympathetic to the South. Abe is the only cannon of that age in the U.S. still on a 19th-century wooden carriage.

The landmark St. George Hotel is listed on the National Register of Historic Places.

Volcano almost became the county seat in 1854 and again in 1857, but the newspaper closed in 1857 and afterwards, the town began to decline.

Although small, Volcano is a town of many "firsts":

- 1854 First theater group in California
- 1854 First debating society in California
- 1854 First circulating library in California
- 1855 First private schools in California
- 1855 First private law school in California
- 1856 First legal hanging in Amador County
- 1860 First astronomical observatory in California
- 1978 First solar still in California

== Tourist attractions ==
Volcano has a number of Gold Rush-era buildings with signs indicating their historic significance. A post office opened in Volcano in 1851. Volcano boasts one of the longest-running general stores in California, having been in continuous use since 1852. The Union Billiard Saloon and Boarding House opened in 1880 and was also the site of the Volcano Justice Court, presided over by Judge Peter Jonas. In 1862, B.F. George built the St. George Hotel on the previous footprint of the Eureka Hotel, which burned down in 1853, and the Empire Hotel, which burned down in 1859. George Madeira established California's first recorded astronomical observatory in 1860 which is where the Great Comet of 1861 was discovered (in the U.S.). It is registered as a California Historical Landmark.

Volcano is also home to Black Chasm Cave, a National Natural Landmark.

The Volcano Theater Company was founded in 1974. The company conducts a full season each year, performing in both the 1856 Cobblestone Theater and in the larger outdoor Volcano Amphitheater.

== Notable people ==
- James T. Farley, United States Senator for California (1879–1885)
- Harry B. Liversedge (1894–1951), born in Volcano. He is a two-time track star at both the 1920 and 1924 Olympics and later Brigadier General best known as the leader of the regiment figured in the historic Iwo Jima flag raising.
- Angelo Joseph Rossi, 31st Mayor of San Francisco (1931–1944)

== Demographics ==
Historical population
Census	Pop.	Note	%±
2010	115		—
2020	104		−9.6%
U.S. Decennial Census; 2010

Volcano first appeared as a census designated place in the 2010 U.S. census.

The 2020 United States census reported that Volcano had a population of 104. The population density was 74.3 inhabitants per square mile (28.7/km^{2}). The racial makeup of Volcano was 81.7% White, 1.9% African American, 1.0% Native American, 1.9% Asian, 0.0% Pacific Islander, 1.9% from other races, and 11.5% from two or more races. Hispanic or Latino of any race were 9.6% of the population.

There were 47 households, out of which 19.1% included children under the age of 18, 34.0% were married-couple households, 8.5% were cohabiting couple households, 29.8% had a female householder with no partner present, and 27.7% had a male householder with no partner present. 55.3% of households were one person, and 44.7% were one person aged 65 or older. The average household size was 2.21. There were 18 families (38.3% of all households).

The age distribution was 16.3% under the age of 18, 6.7% aged 18 to 24, 19.2% aged 25 to 44, 18.3% aged 45 to 64, and 39.4% who were 65 years of age or older. The median age was 55.5 years. There were 38 males and 66 females.

There were 73 housing units at an average density of 52.1 units per square mile (20.1 units/km^{2}), of which 47 (64.4%) were occupied. Of these, 95.7% were owner-occupied, and 4.3% were occupied by renters.

== Government ==
In the California State Legislature, Volcano is in the 4th senatorial district, represented by Republican Marie Alvarado-Gil, and the 1st Assembly district, represented by Republican Heather Hadwick.

In the United States House of Representatives, Volcano is in California's 5th congressional district, represented by Republican Tom McClintock.

== In popular culture ==
Volcano was featured by Huell Howser in Road Trip Episode 127.

The Civil War episode was the subject of Death Valley Days Season 7 Episode 21: Eruption at Volcano (see List of Death Valley Days episodes#Season 7 (1958–59)).

== Gallery ==
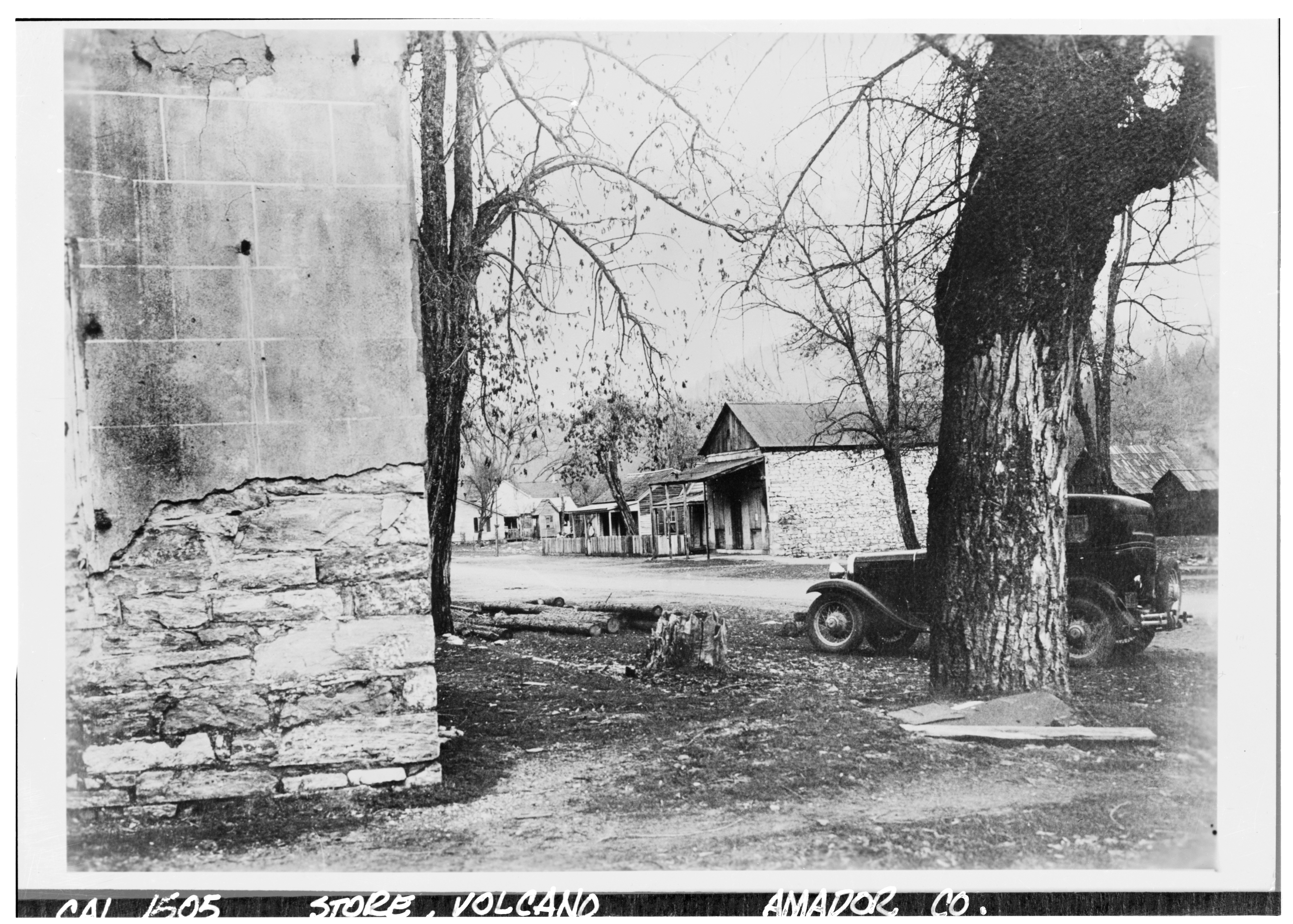
1938 Main Street Volcano

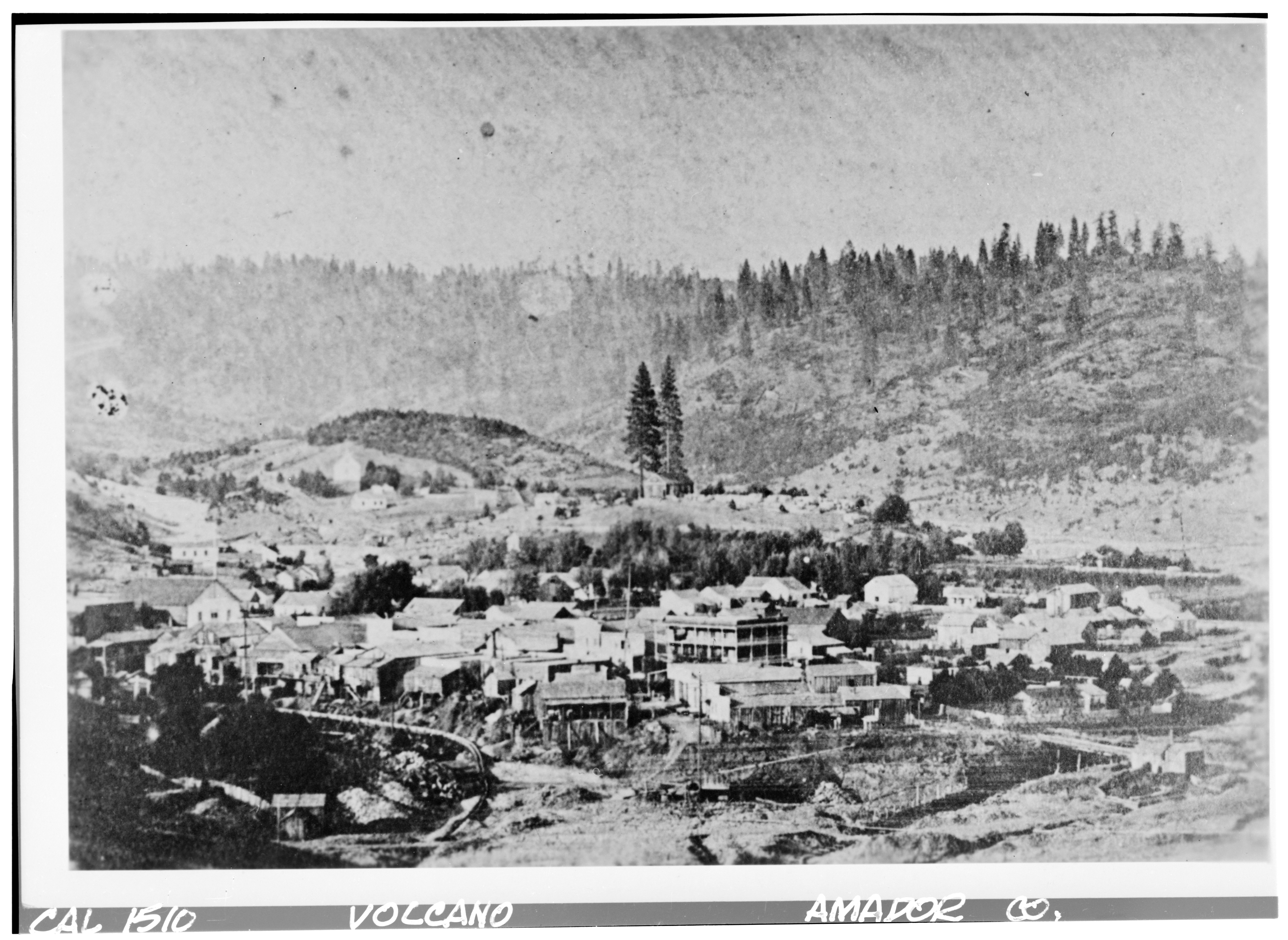
Volcano early 1850s

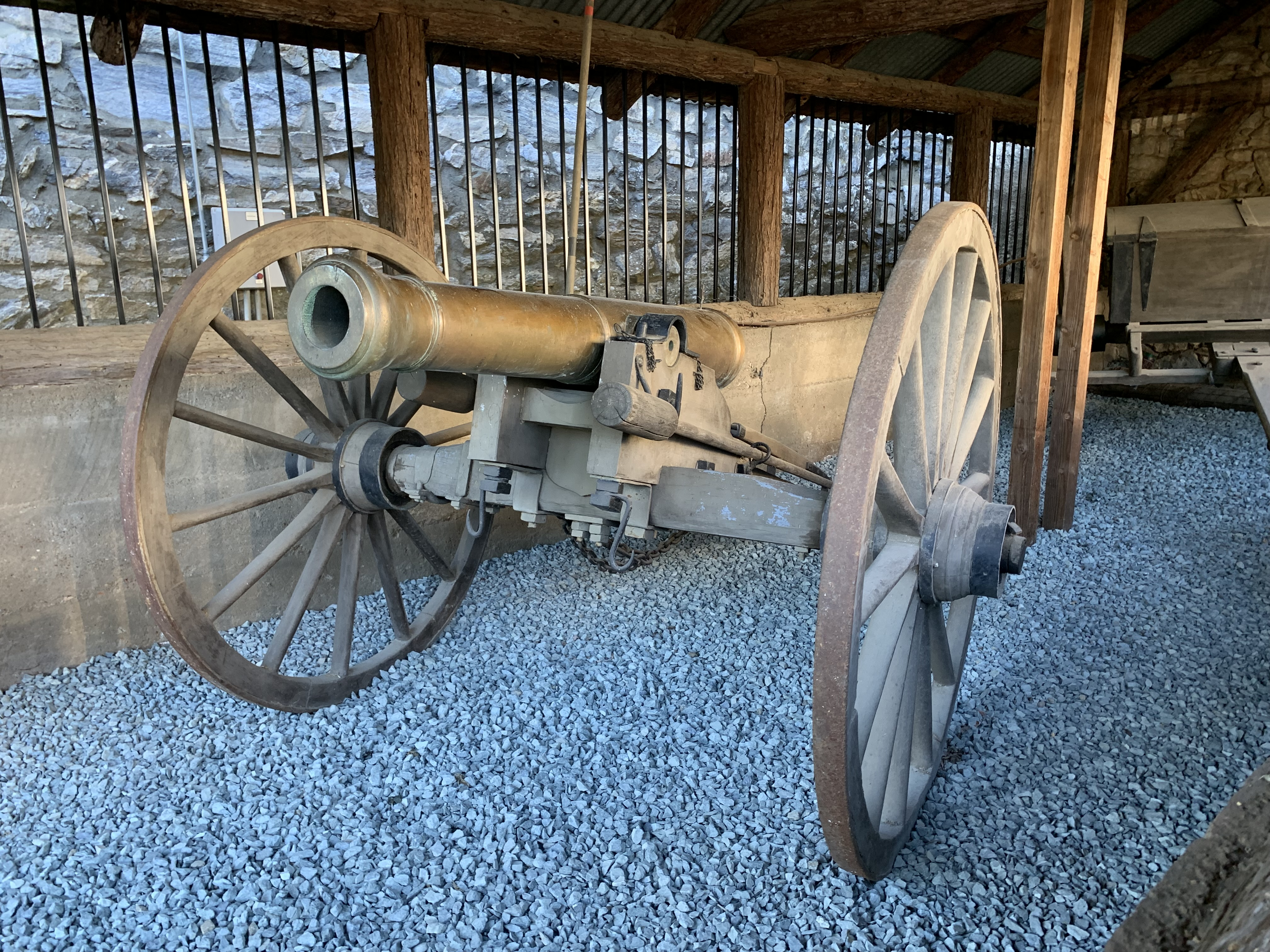
"Old Abe" cannon from the American Civil War

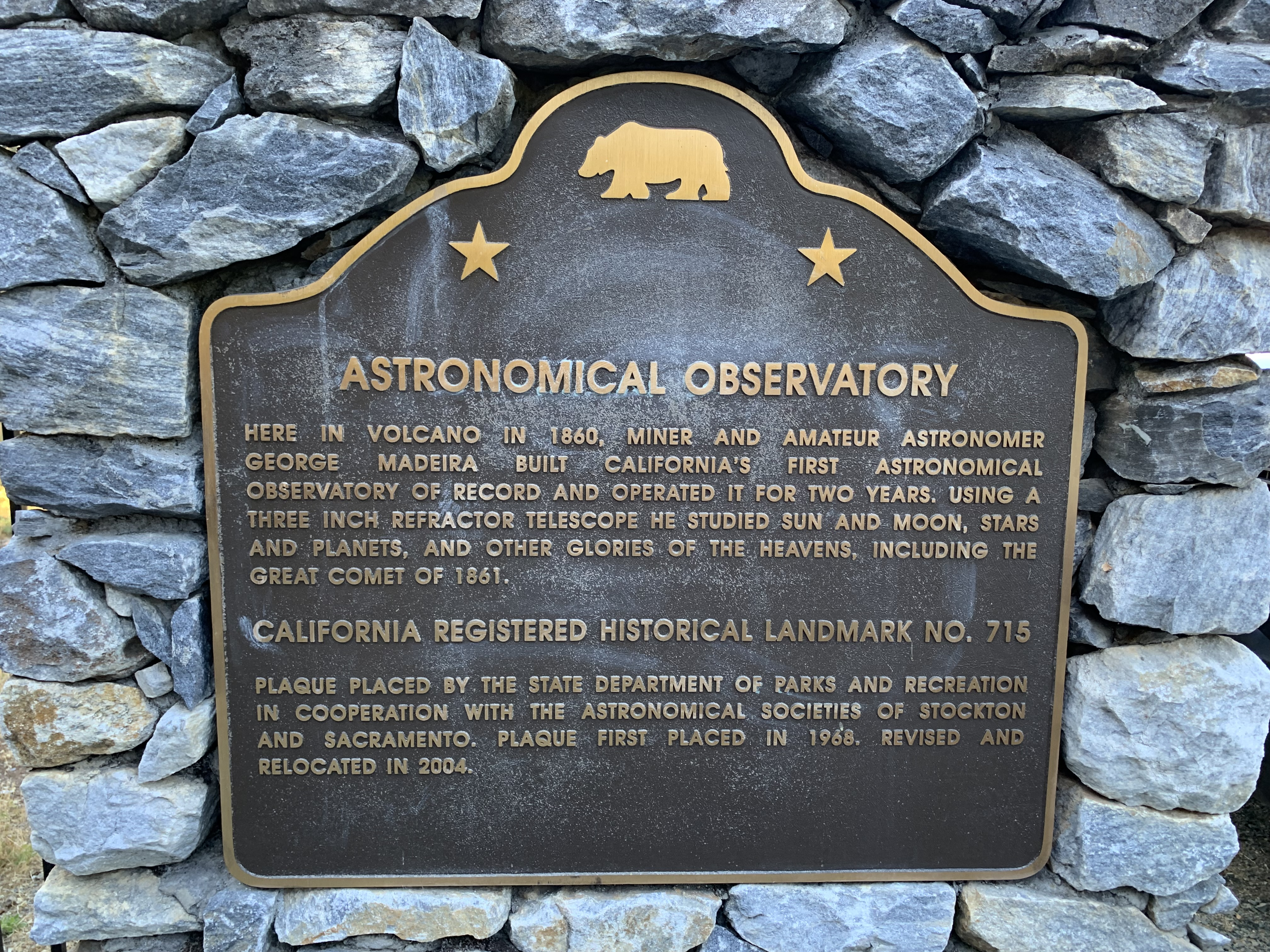
Astronomical observatory plaque

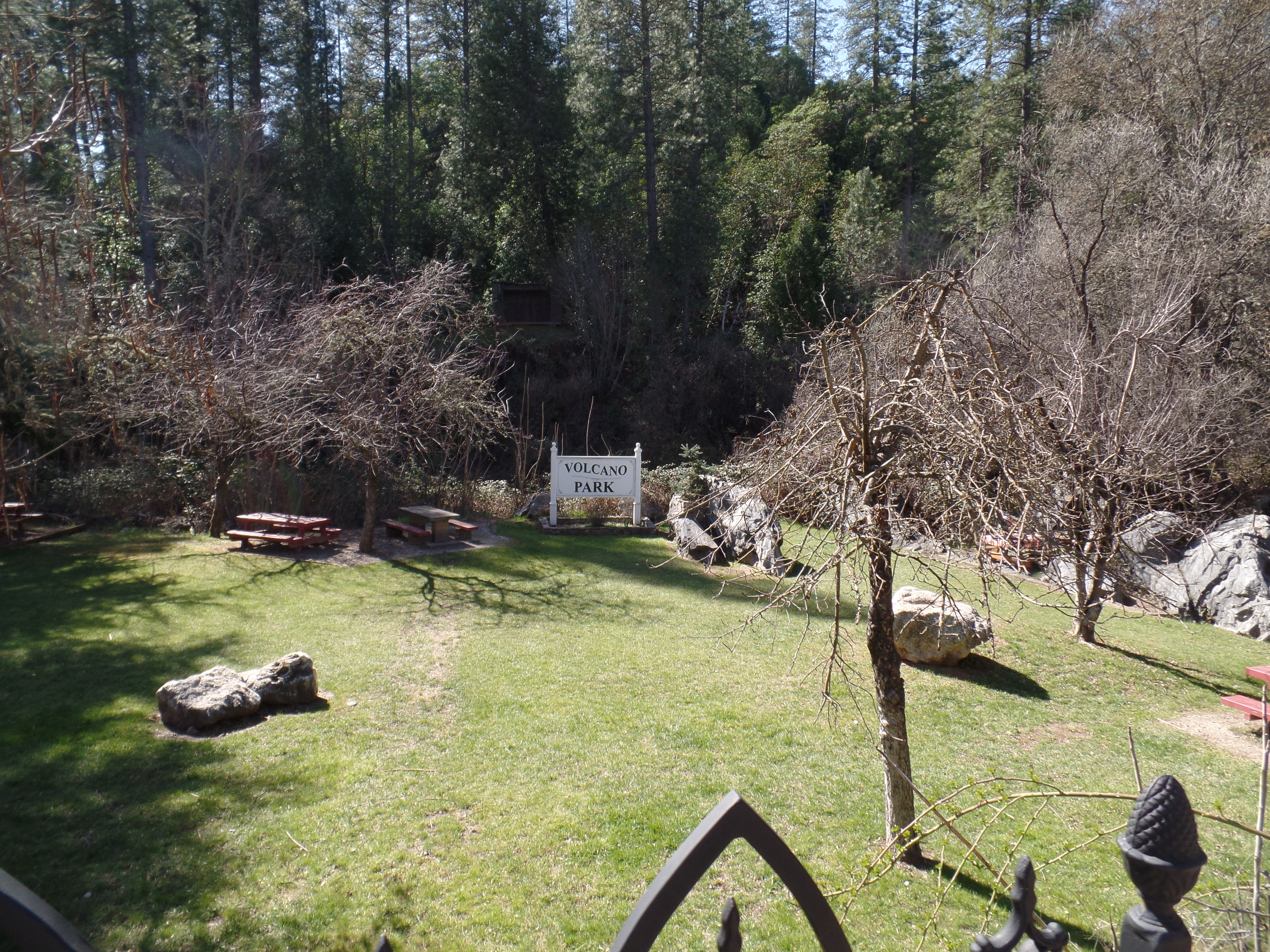
Volcano park

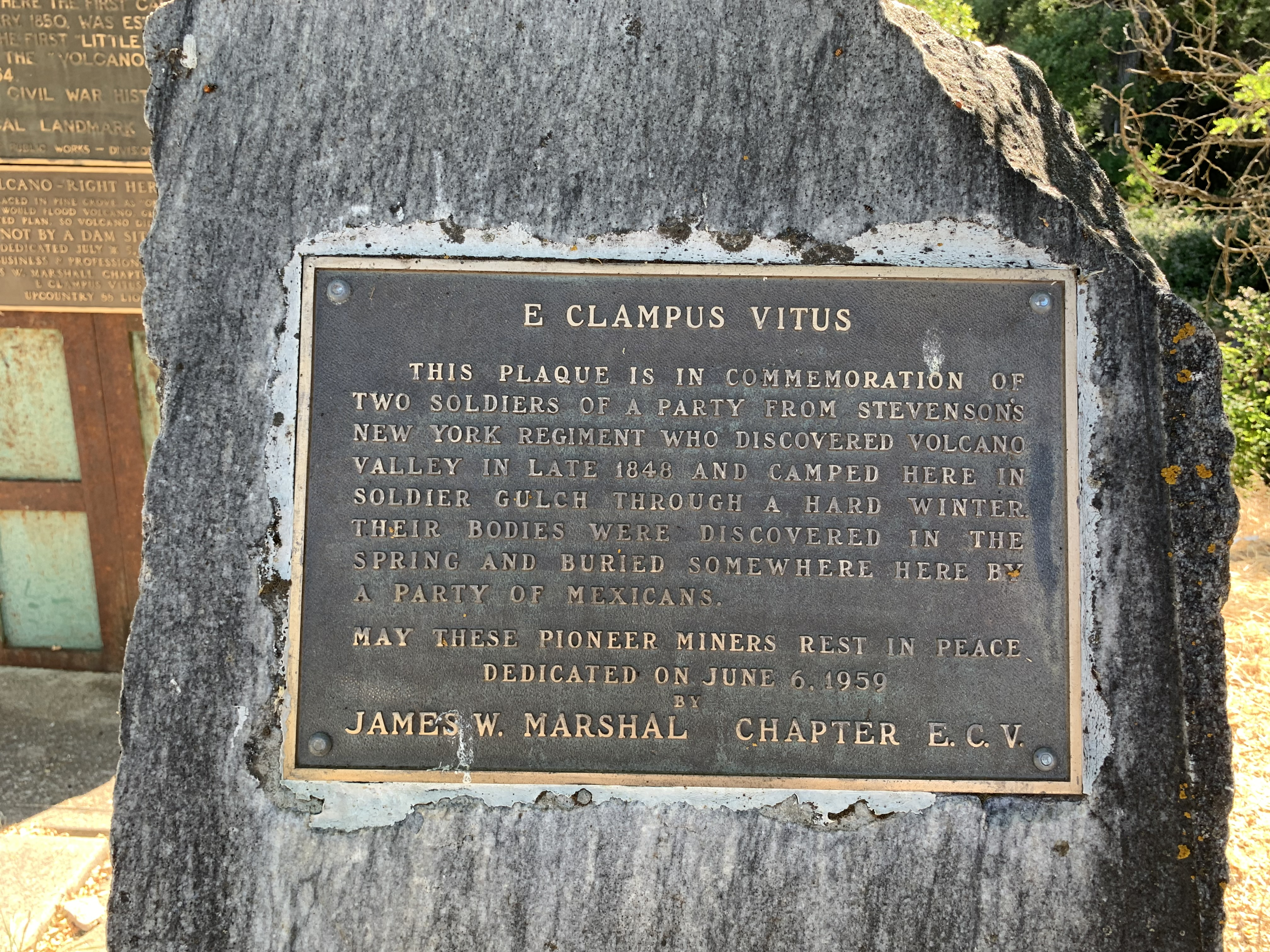
Plaque commemorating founding of Volcano

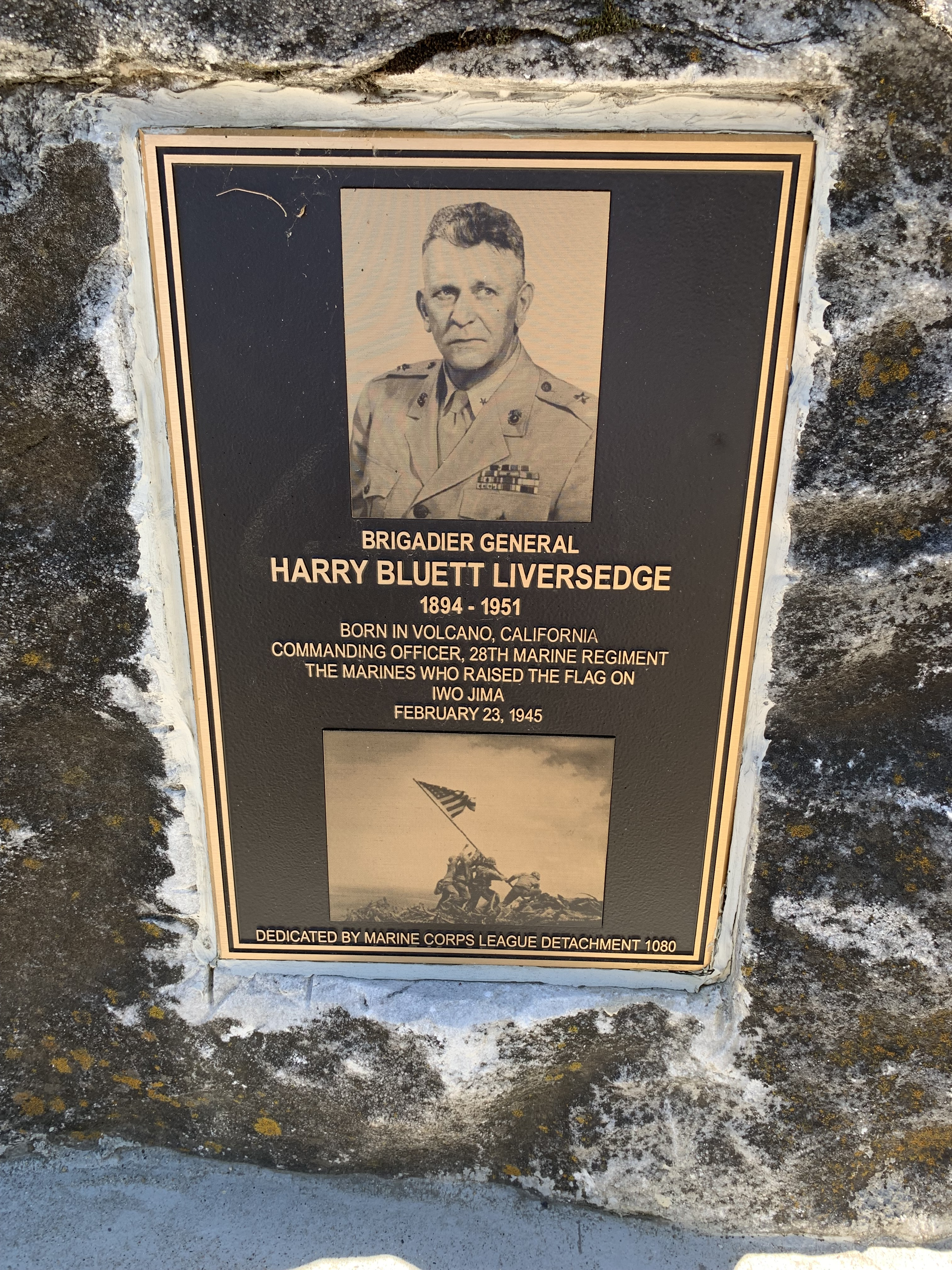
Plaque of hometown hero Brigadier General Harry Bluett Liversedge

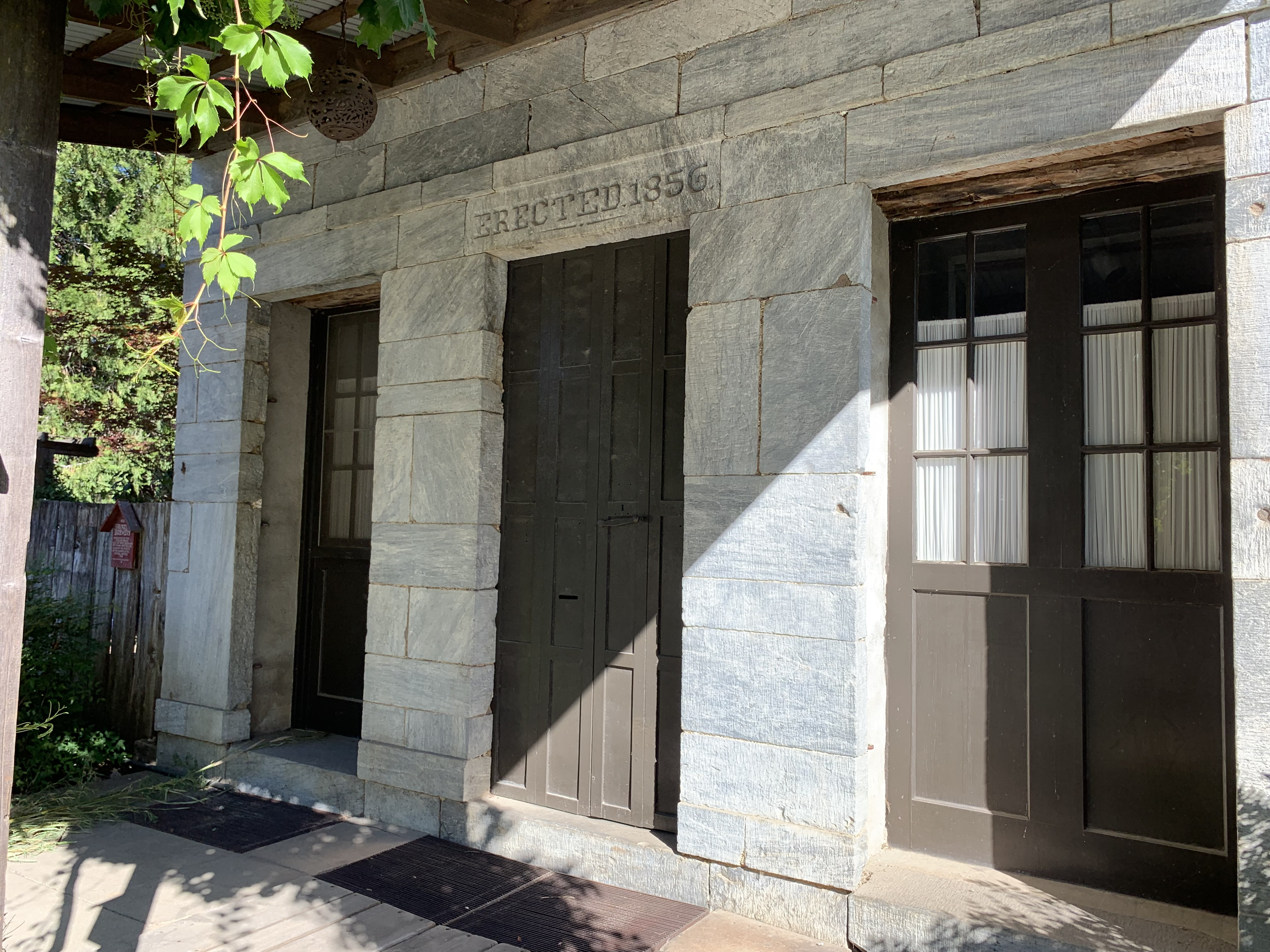
Bavarian Brewery built 1856
