= Drury Melone =

American politician (1833–1903)

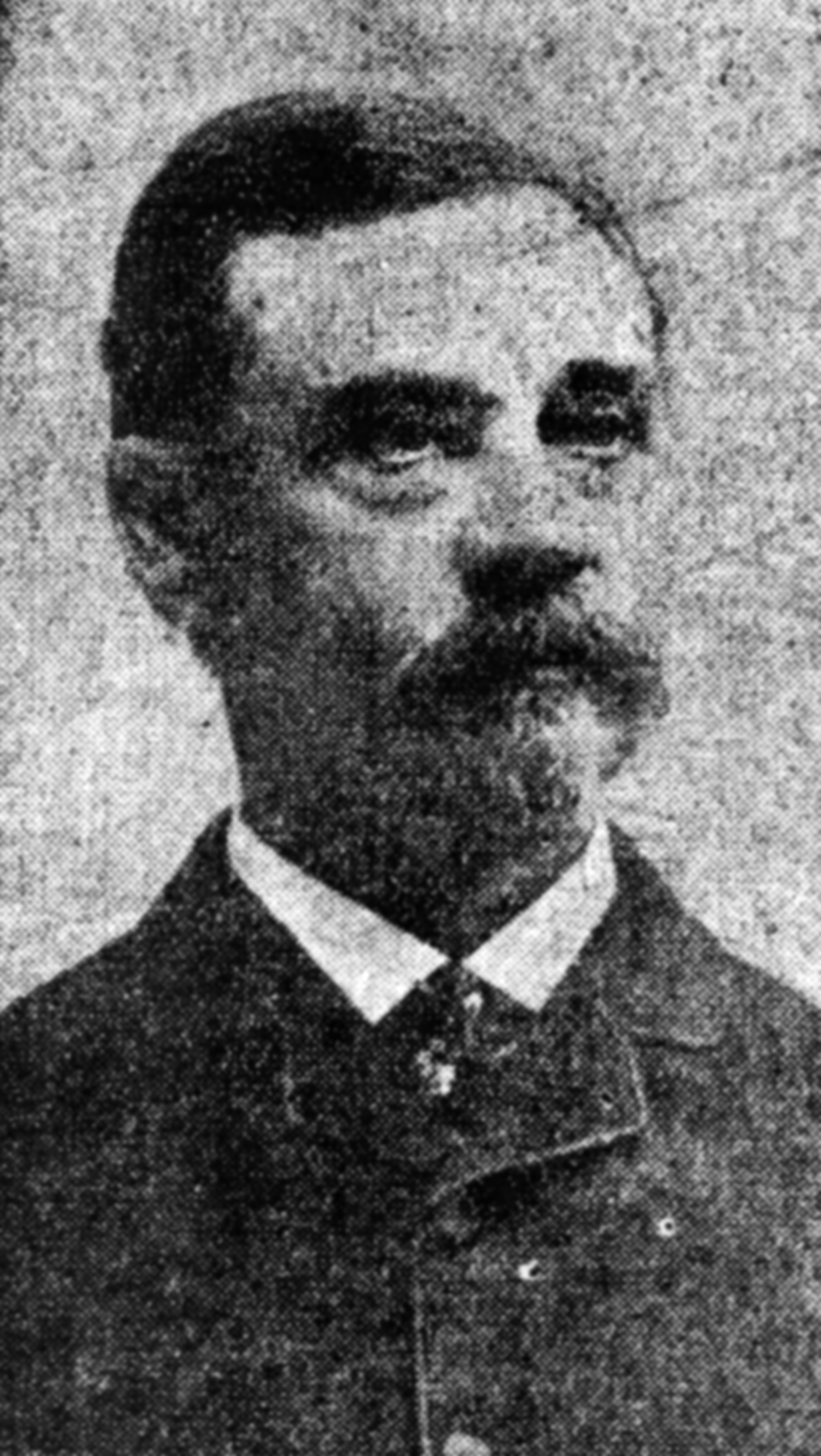
- Portrait by I. W. Taber

11th Secretary of State of California
- In office December 4, 1871 – December 6, 1875
- Governor: Newton Booth
- Preceded by: Henry L. Nichols
- Succeeded by: Thomas Beck

Personal details
- Born: c. 1833 Kentucky, U.S.
- Died: May 24, 1903 (aged 69–70) Napa County, California, U.S.
- Party: Republican

Drury Melone (c. 1833 – May 24, 1903) was a California politician who served as the 11th California Secretary of State and a Presidential Elector. Melone was a stockholder of the Union Pacific Railroad and also owned and operated the St. George Hotel in Sacramento, California.
