= Charlie Hall =

Charlie or Charley Hall may refer to:

== Sports ==
- Charlie Hall (baseball) (1863–1921), American baseball player
- Charley Hall (rugby union) (1874–1944), English rugby union player
- Charley Hall (pitcher) (1884–1943), American baseball player
- Charley Hall (outfielder) (1923–1996), American Negro league baseball player
- Charlie Hall (defensive back) (1948–1998), American football player for the Green Bay Packers
- Charlie Hall (linebacker) (born 1948), former American football player for the Cleveland Browns
- Charlie Hall (footballer) (born 2005), English footballer

== Other people ==
- Charlie Hall (actor, born 1899) (1899–1959), English film actor
- Charlie Hall (politician) (1930–2014), American politician
- Charlie Hall (musician) (born 1973), American contemporary worship musician
- Charlie Hall (actor, born 1997), American television and film actor

== See also ==
- Charles Hall (disambiguation)
