= Black Chasm Cave =

Cave in California, U.S.

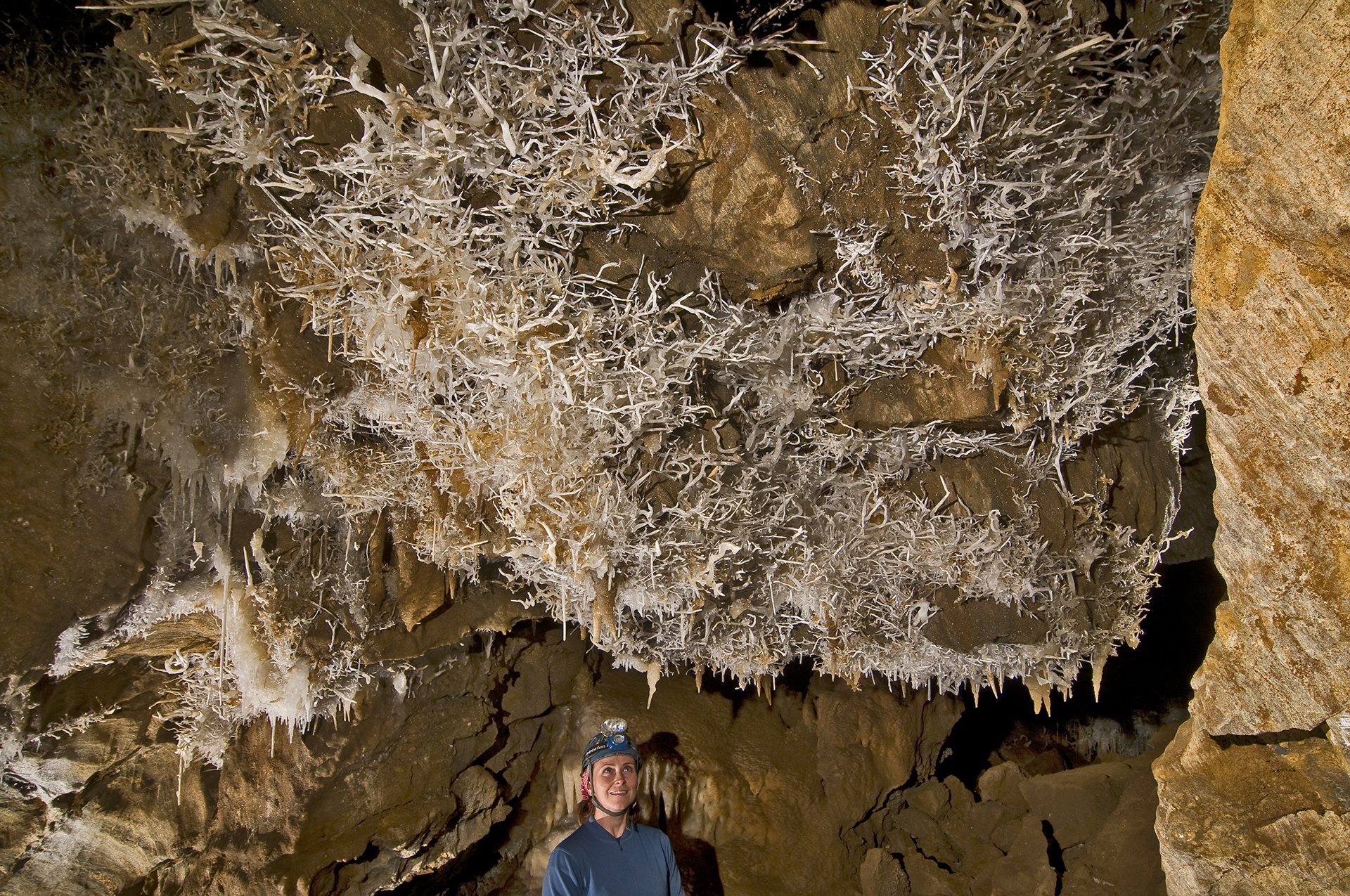
Helictites in the Landmark Room, on a wall visible from the tourist trail

Black Chasm Cavern is a cave in the hamlet of Volcano in Amador County, California.

Black Chasm Cave tour July 2021

== Geology ==
Black Chasm Cavern is a dissolution cave, formed by carbonic acid eroding the subterranean bedrock. This eroded the limestone bedrock to form small to very large chambers. It is formed in what is considered to be part of the Calaveras Complex. The crystal structure of the metamorphic rock has changed over time, and it is now properly referred to as marble. Many lakes make up the lower levels of the cavern. The calcite formations in Black Chasm Cavern are derivative of the marble bedrock, containing primarily calcium or calcium carbonate (CaCO_{3}). There are a variety of formations in Black Chasm Cavern, including stalactites, stalagmites, columns, flowstone, draperies, ribbons, angel's wings, cave bacon, soda straws, helictites, false floors, and others.

== Biology ==
Black Chasm Cavern is home to amphipods, which live in the lakes of the cave. The amphipods are adapted to life without light, having no pigmentation or eyesight. Also living within the cave, and adapted to total darkness, is the Banksula grubbsi arachnid. Related to the harvestman, the Banksula grubbsi has a multi-segmented body that appears to be one single trunk at first glance, it has detached retinas, and no pigmentation. It also is found nowhere in the world except Black Chasm Cavern. As for bats, none have colonized the cave, however, there are many bats in the area. During the cool hours of the morning and evening, you will see the bats flying and diving through the air as they feed on insects.

== History ==
Black Chasm was likely known about by the local Miwok tribes, though gold miners were the first credited with exploring the cave in 1854. The miners described the cave as having "...vaulted chamber[s] large enough to contain the largest trees..." and "... crystals [that] stood out from the walls in every conceivable direction, turning and bending into many shapes...". These turning and bending formations are known as helictites and are an unusual formation in cave systems throughout the world. Somewhere near the 1860s, the cave entrance was enlarged from its original 18" wide crack in order to accommodate stairs for tours. The tours lasted only a short time before the cave was abandoned.

Following the gold rush, Black Chasm's name faded from recent memory amongst the population only to be rediscovered with a resurgence in caving interest in the 1950s. One early expedition is credited with discovering the rare and prolific display of helictites in the Landmark Room in 1954. In 1962, a diver entered into Lake Reflection, one of the many lakes in the cave, and descended to 65' in depth before hitting bottom. This dive took place in summertime when the fluctuating lake level is at its lowest. In 2001, the lake was dived again, during it highest level, when the diver hit 80 feet in depth. While there are no known deaths from early cave exploration, there has been at least one serious injury in 1974 which resulted in a six-hour-long rescue.

Black Chasm Cavern has passed through various owners, including Owens Illinois Cement Co., American Cement Co.,Sierra Nevada Recreation Corporation (SNRC), and currently Gold Country Adventures. Black Chasm was selected for consideration as a National Natural Landmark (NNL) in 1975 after National Park Service personnel entered into the cave and saw the helictite crystal display in the Landmark Room. The park service personnel described Black Chasm as having, "The best helictites in the west.". At the time, Black Chasm was slated to be quarried, as an open pit mine, for the gravel that the bedrock would provide. The quarry company who owned the land was aware of the cave, but not of its rare display of helictites. After the NNL status was granted in January 1976, the quarry company still had legal rights to quarry the property, but there was a moral obligation placed on the landowners to preserve the cave in order to retain its NNL status. The quarry company chose to honor the NNL status, separating the cavern property from the remainder of the quarry, which is still in production today.

== Development ==
SNRC purchased Black Chasm Cavern in 1996 and began offering 5 hour expedition trips, including rappelling, rafting, climbing, and crawling through the wild areas of the cave. These trips ran for four summers before damage to the delicate areas of the cave was deemed too steep a price to continue offering tours through the wild cave. In 1999, development began on the property, which included creating a road, septic and utility installation, and building storage facilities. Stair building into the cavern began in July 2000, with the first walking tours being offered on the last weekend in September 2000. The trail-building spanned just over 10 months, as the crew frequently harnessed up and used ropes for the construction process. Though introductory tours were being conducted during the stair construction period, the grand opening of Black Chasm took place in April 2001. Future plans to extend the trail will allow guests to visit twice as many chambers as are currently seen on the walking tour.

Early tour guests purchased their tickets at a kiosk, but in December 2003 a 3,000 square feet (280 m^{2}). visitor center was opened to the public. In the same year, an updated survey and exploration took place in the cave and in one of the lakes. Using traditional tape measures and compass readings, as well as using a laser measuring device, the exploration team surveyed the original half mile of cave and also discovered an additional half mile, doubling the length of known cave. Total surveyed length of Black Chasm is 3,136 feet (956 m), and the overall depth, including the lake, is 225 feet (69 m), with 146 feet (45 m) above lake level.

Black Chasm Cavern currently offers Landmark walking tours for all ages, and a self-guided nature hike through the rock Zen Garden. From 2011-2015, Black Chasm Cavern offered a new 2.5 hour expedition trip, called the Labyrinth Tour. This tour explored the surface features of convoluted rock created by the hydraulic mining process used during the gold rush. Guests were able to climb, crawl, slither, slide, and rappel during the Labyrinth Tour.

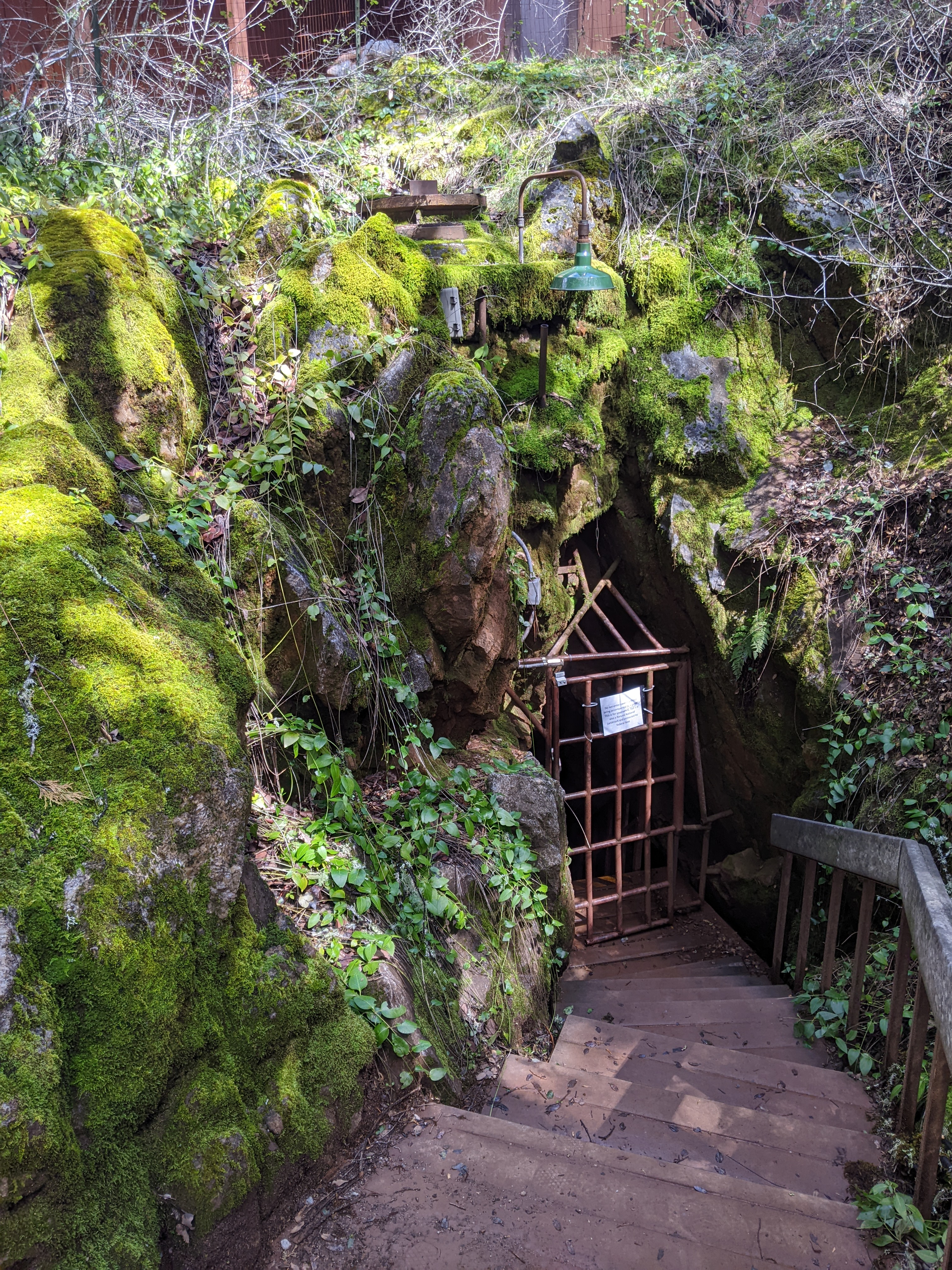

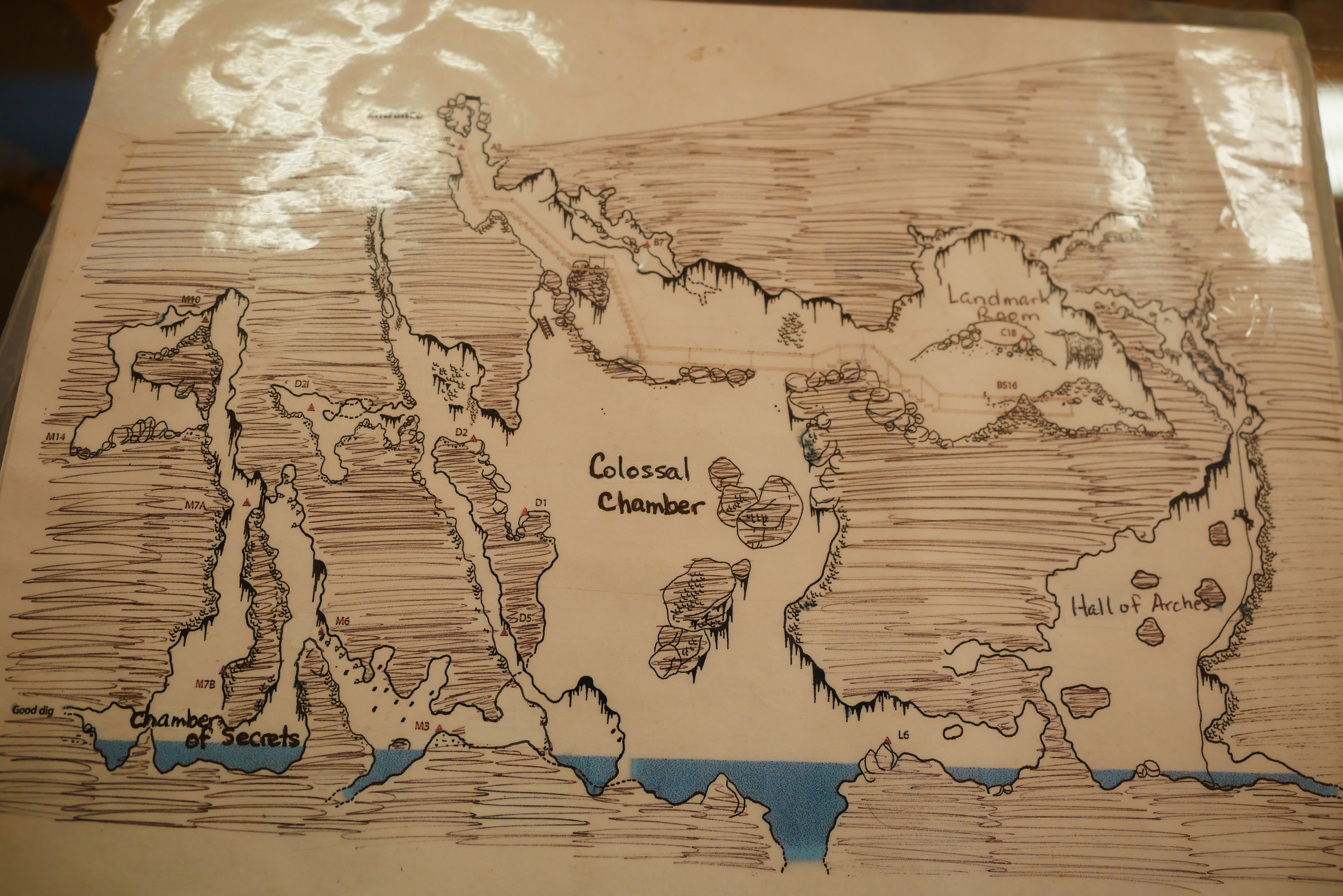

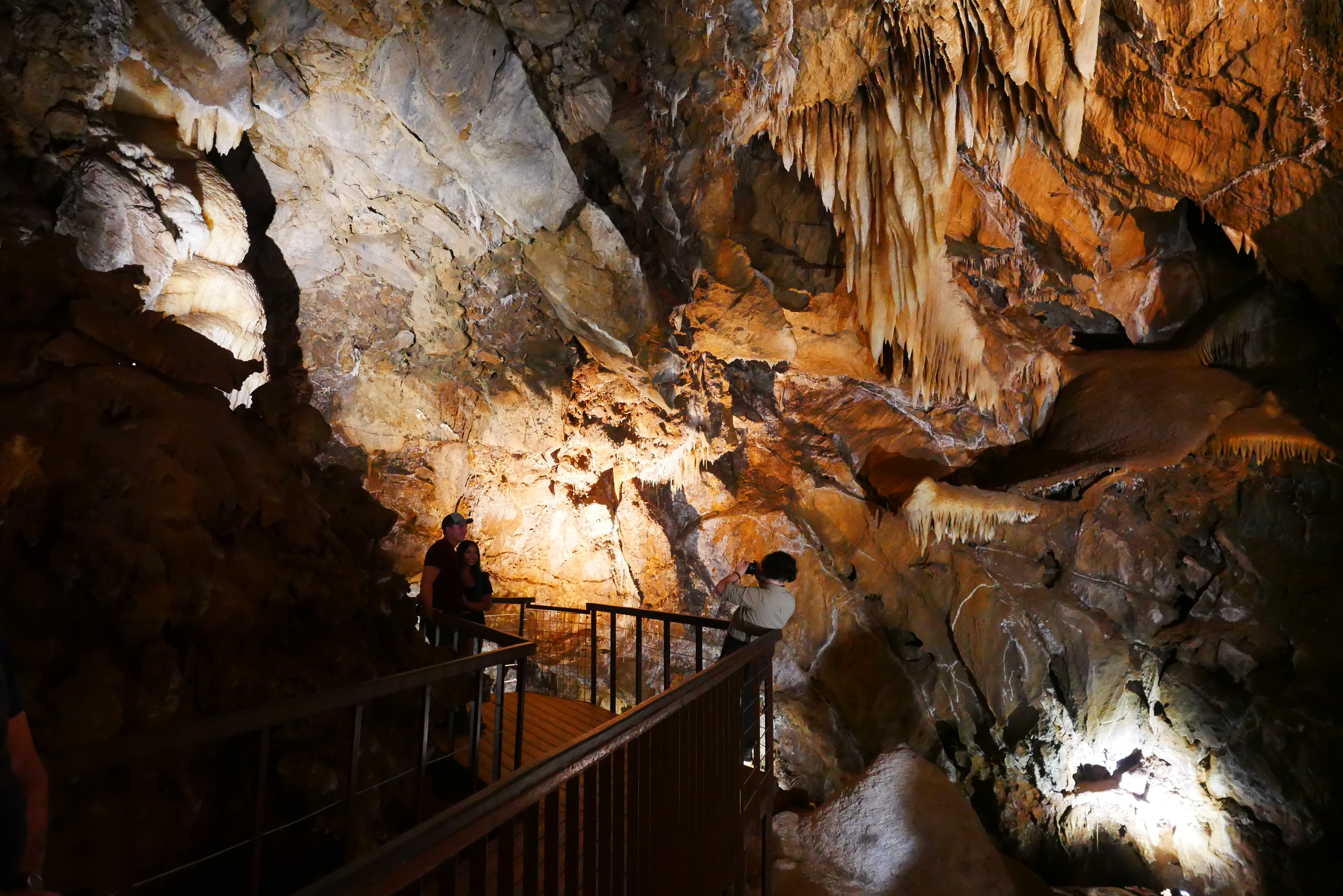

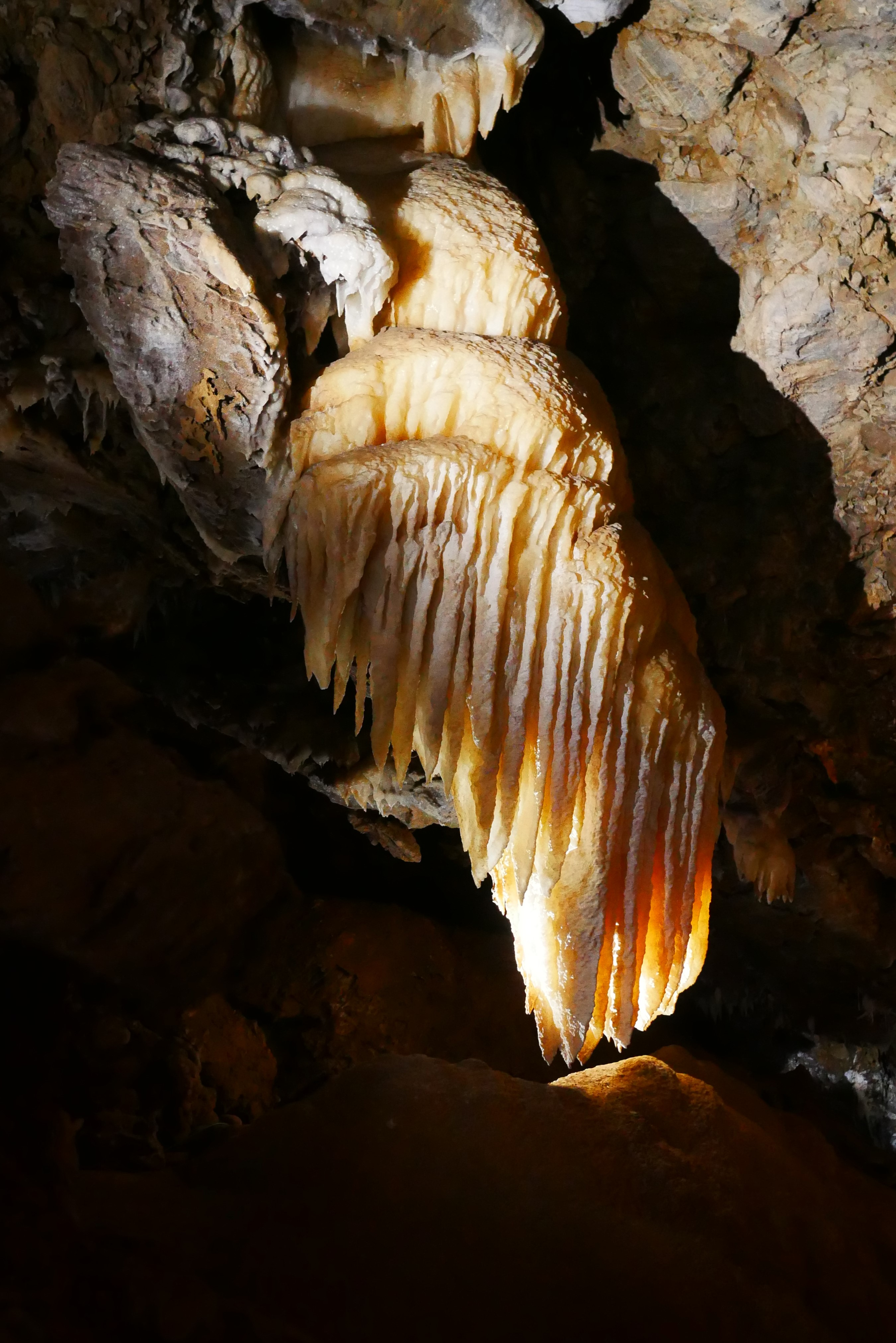

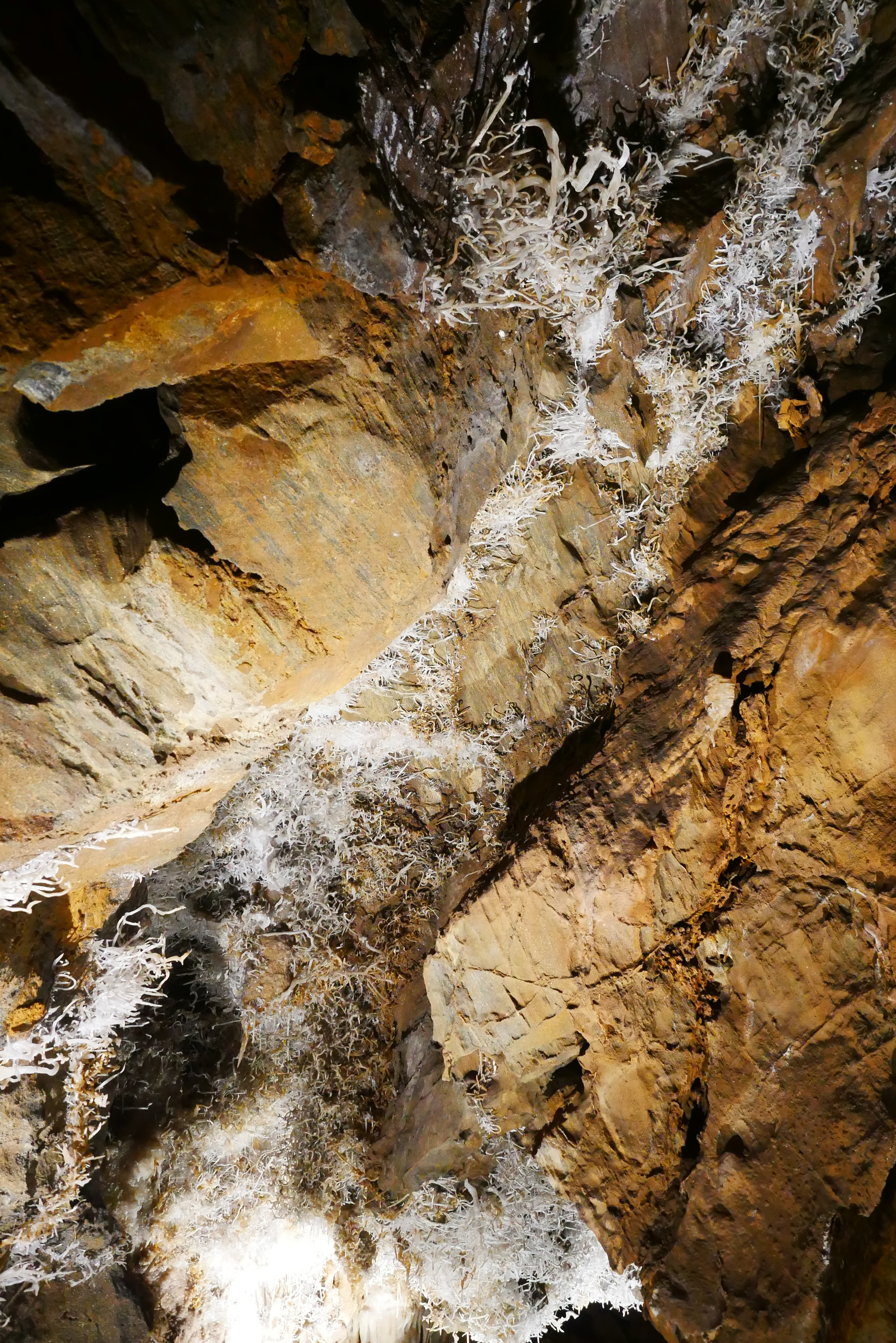

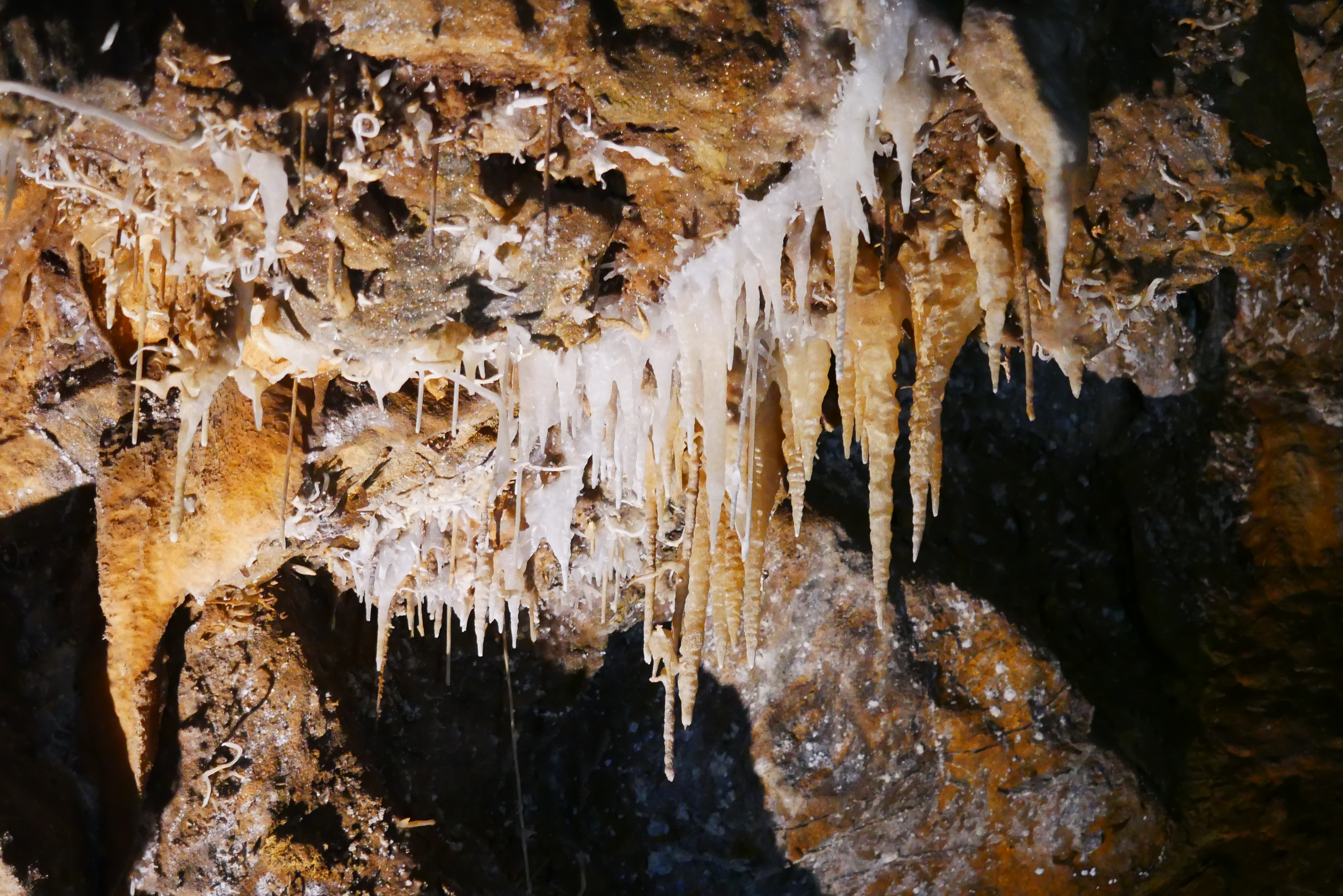
