= Charles Frederick Hall =

British violinist

Charles Frederick Hall (18 December 1815 – 9 February 1874) was an English musician and musical director of the Adelphi Theatre, London.

== Early life ==
He was born 18 December 1815 in Norwich, Norfolk, England, the son of actor William Frederick Hall and Jane Greenfield. He was baptized at St Michael at Thorn, Norwich, Christmas Day, 1815. He was baptized again in the Swedenborgian church in Norwich as a teenager

As a boy, Hall joined the juvenile opera company of London impresario Robert William Elliston at the Surrey Theatre, London. He returned home to Norwich after Elliston's death in 1831. He then studied the violin with Friedrich Mueller, musical director of the Theatre Royal Norwich. In 1835, at the age of 15, Hall played a violin solo, an air by Joseph Mayseder, in a benefit concert. That same year, the Norwich business directory listed Hall as a professor of the violin, piano, guitar, and singing. He also performed at local dances and parties with a quadrille band he founded.

== Moving to London ==
At the age of 25, Hall moved to London. There he studied at the Royal Academy of Music and gave the occasional lecture at the Holborn Literary Institution. By the early fall of 1842, Hall earned the position of second leader in the Drury Lane Theatre orchestra "after a contest of skill." Hall also began composing vocal pieces while in London, including the ballads "The Soft Evening Hour," "There is a Hope," "I have dream'd of hopes defeated," and "The Inconstant." The Morning Chronicle singled out for praise two other of Hall's vocal pieces, calling the first "an elegant little ballad with an expressive melody" and the second "a graceful fairy song, light, airy, and imaginative."

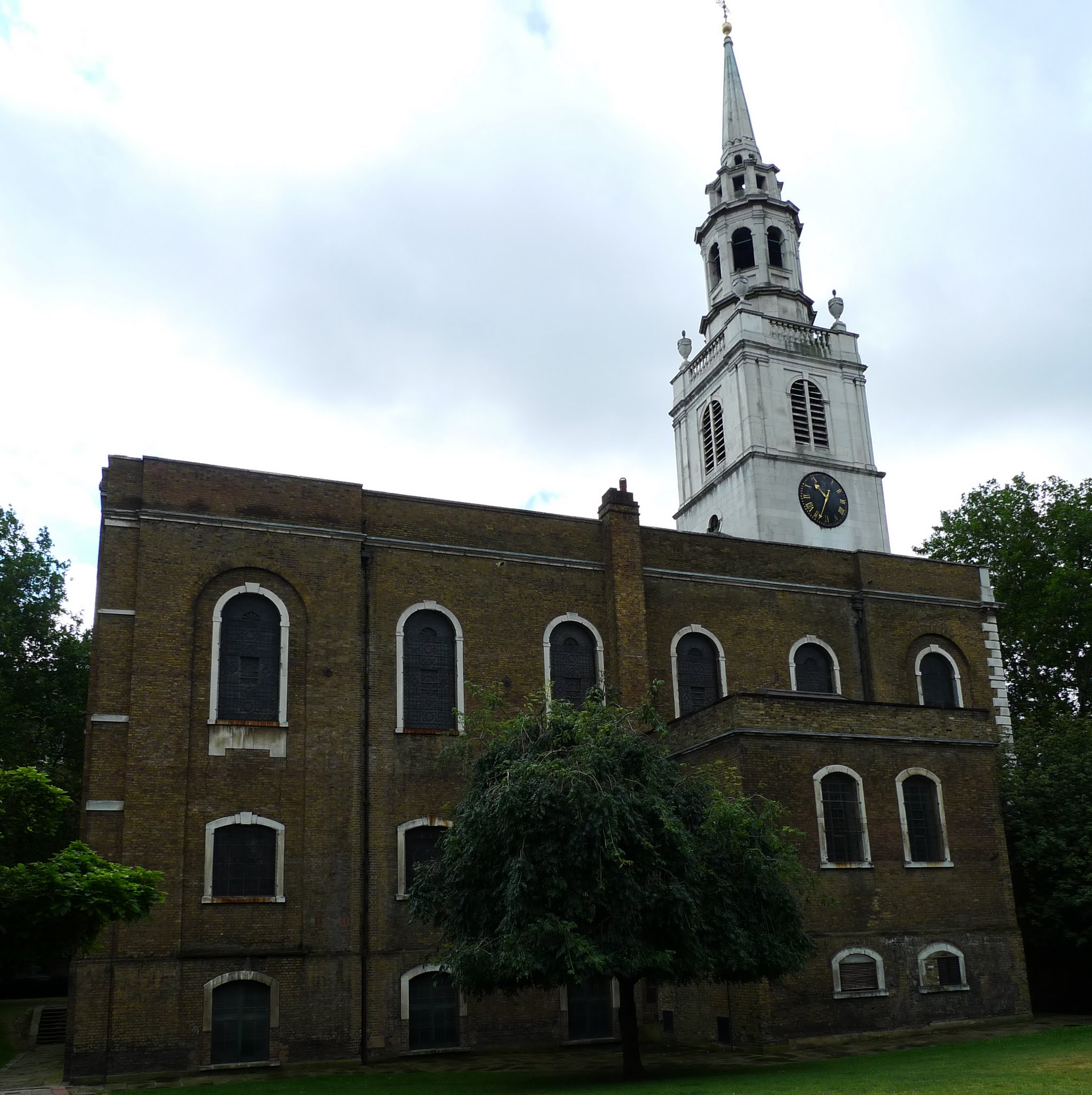
St James Clerkenwell - panoramio

== First marriage ==
On 6 November 1844, Hall married Eleanor Eliza Jane "Ellen" Vining at St James Church, Clerkenwell. They lived for a time at 33 North Street, near Kings Cross station, where their only child, Charles King Hall, was born in August 1845.

== Concert organizer ==
In 1847, Hall, along with George Smith, former manager of the Theatre Royal Norwich, invited the Swedish soprano Jenny Lind to give two concerts in Norwich.

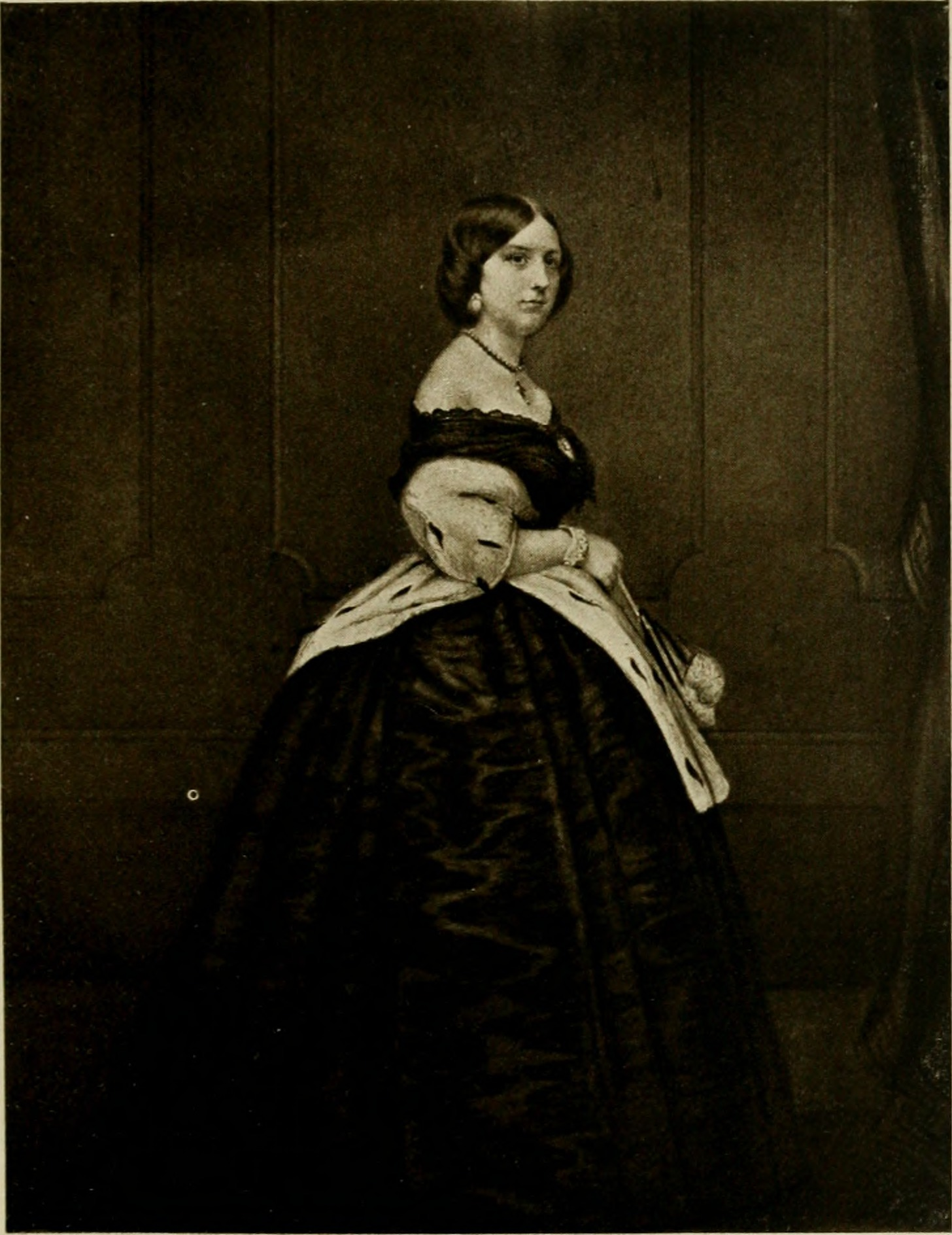
Jenny Lind. From a photograph made about 1851 (2)

Hall's stepfather, George Gedge, put up 1,000 pounds for the concerts. Jenny Lind performed in St Andrew's Hall, Norwich, on the 22 and 23 September 1847. She gave an impromptu concert the morning of the 24th before leaving the city. The professional musicians who accompanied Lind had been specially selected by Hall from the Covent Garden Opera House, Drury Lane Theatre, and the Royal Philharmonic Society. Michael Balfe conducted this orchestra while Hall acted as leader. Additionally, Hall performed a solo himself each evening.

Two years later Hall and his business partner, William Howlett, a Norwich merchant, staged six consecutive nights of "grand concerts and balls" during the city of Norwich's annual agricultural week. Hall and Howlett booked two international singers for the concerts: mezzo-soprano Jetty Treffz and baritone Johann Baptist Pischek. Hall's wife, Ellen Vining, made her stage debut at the first concert, in which she sang soprano in a trio and accompanied Jetty Treffz on the piano. The six concerts were a financial failure. As the Norfolk Chronicle put it, "the spirited entrepreneurs [Hall and Howlett] have sustained a heavy loss." Later that same year, the Choral Society of Norwich staged a benefit concert of Handel's Messiah expressly in aid of Hall and his partner.

== Theatre Career in London ==
From 1859 to 1860, Hall held the position of musical director at the newly rebuilt Adelphi Theatre, London. He later served in the same capacity at the Princess's Theatre in Oxford Street. He supplied the incidental music for Dion Boucicault's The Streets of London, a play performed first at that theatre in 1864. A contemporary review of the first production said that the composer won "the goodwill of the audience" by incorporating "the street tunes of the times". The Era, the London weekly covering theatrical news, referred to Hall as "the well-known conductor at the Princess's Theatre" in February 1867.

== Second marriage ==
In 1866 Hall married actress Caroline Eliza Latham Haselton, with whom he lived at 179 Hampstead Road, near Euston Station. What exactly happened to Hall's first wife, Ellen, is uncertain. An Eliza Jemima Hall, aged about 37, was buried in West Norwood Cemetery in Feb 1863, where Frederick Vining, Hall's father-in-law, is buried However, a mezzo-soprano known as Ellen Vining was performing in England as late as 1876, at which time her name stopped appearing in theatrical notices.

== Death ==
Charles Frederick Hall died on 9 February 1874 at 8 Deane Street, Liverpool, England, at the age of 58. He was buried two days later in Anfield Cemetery, Liverpool. The burial register records his profession as professor of music. A flat tombstone says, "In Affectionate Remembrance of Charles Frederick Hall, who died Feb 9th 1874, aged 58.
