= Charley Hall (outfielder) =

American baseball player

- Outfielder
- Born: July 30, 1923; Webster Groves, Missouri
- Died: May 24, 1996 (aged 72); St. Louis, Missouri

Negro league baseball debut
- 1948, for the Kansas City Monarchs

Last appearance
- 1948, for the Kansas City Monarchs
- Stats at Baseball Reference

Teams
- Kansas City Monarchs (1948)

Charles Emmit Hall (July 30, 1923 – May 24, 1996) was an American Negro league outfielder in the 1940s.

A native of Webster Groves, Missouri, Hall played for the Kansas City Monarchs in 1948. In his lone recorded game, he went hitless in two at-bats. Hall died in St. Louis, Missouri in 1996 at age 72.
