= Charles Hall (cricketer, born 1842) =

English cricketer

Personal information
- Born: 16 October 1842; Islington, London
- Died: London
- Batting: Right-handed
- Bowling: Right-arm fast
- Role: Batsman

Domestic team information
- Years: Team
- 1867: Middlesex

Career statistics
| Competition | First-class |
|---|---|
| Matches | 1 |
| Runs scored | 12 |
| Batting average | 6.00 |
| 100s/50s | 0 |
| Top score | 12 |
| Catches/stumpings | 0/0 |
- Source: Charles Hall CricInfo

Charles Hall (16 October 1842 – unknown) was an English first-class cricketer active 1867 who played in a single match for Middlesex. He was born in Islington and died in (unknown). He was a righthanded batsman and a right-arm fast roundarm bowler.
