= St. George Hotel (Volcano, California) =

- U.S. National Register of Historic Places
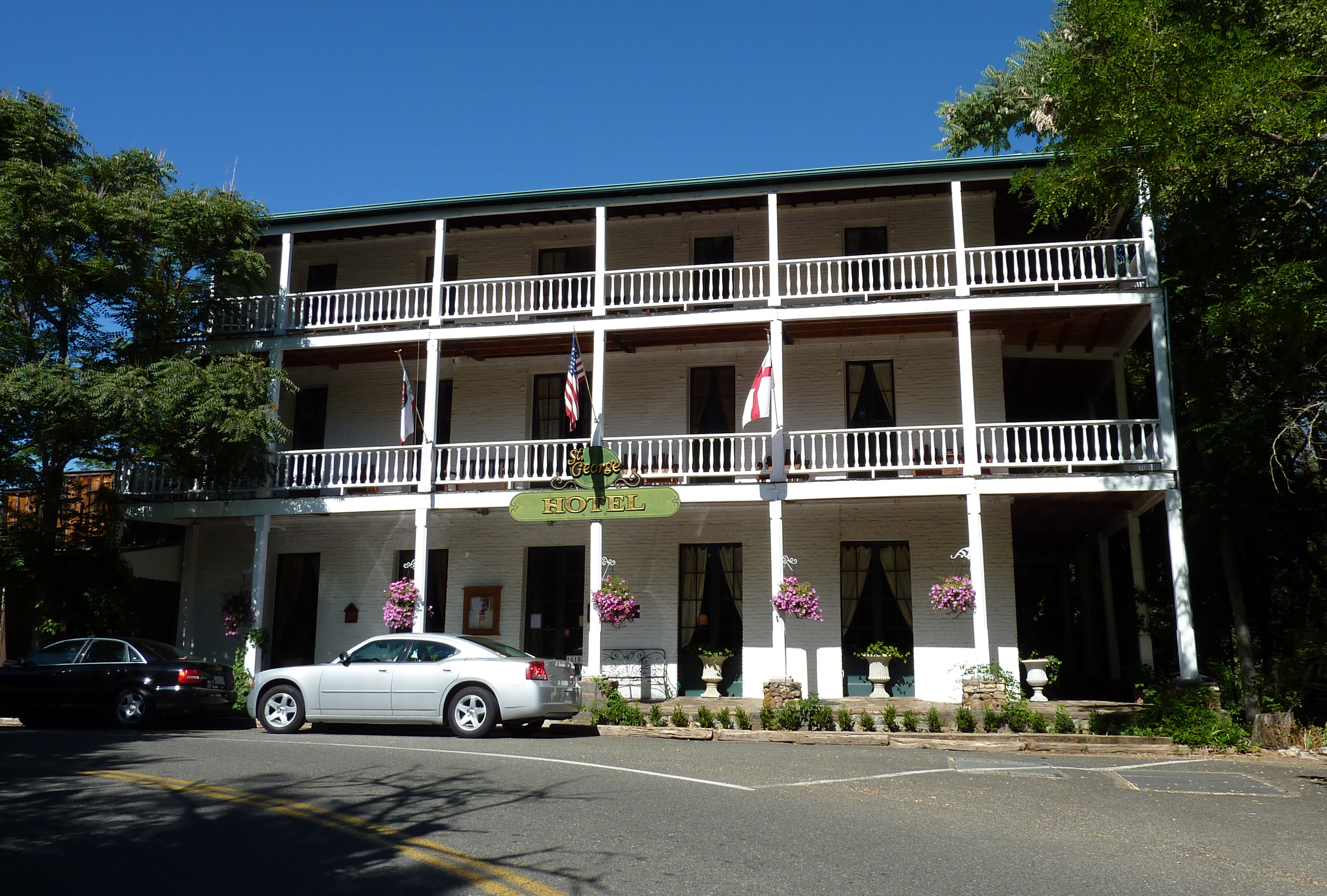

- Location within California
- Location: 2 Main St., Volcano, California
- Coordinates: 38°26′31″N 120°37′47″W
- Area: 1.1 acres (0.45 ha)
- Built: 1867
- Architectural style: Greek Revival
- NRHP reference No.: 84000757
- Added to NRHP: September 7, 1984

The St. George Hotel in Volcano, Amador County, California. It was built in 1867, after the two previous hotels (the Empire Hotel and the George Hotel, originally built as a boarding house in 1852) burned. It was listed on the National Register of Historic Places in 1984.

It is a three-story brick hotel with 14 hotel rooms, reflecting Greek Revival influence. It faces west onto Main St. (now also known as Pine Grove–Volcano Road). Its 1983 National Register nomination asserted that it was "the most impressive building" in town, and that it appeared "much the same ... as it was in 1880, thirteen years after it opened."

== See also ==
- Drury Melone
