= Charles Winslow Hall =

American artist

- Portrait of artist Charles Winslow Hall in the Boston Journal, 1 October 1901
- Born: Caroline Winslow Hall; 22 May 1860; Malden, Massachusetts
- Died: 29 September 1901 (aged 41); Aboard the steamship Citta di Torino
- Known for: Painting, sculpture
- Notable work: Portrait of Joseph Frank Currier
- Movement: Realism
- Partner: Giuseppina Boriani

Charles Winslow Hall, born Caroline (May 22, 1860 – September 29, 1901) was an American artist of animals and portraits. He is best known for having lived as a man for the last ten years of his life while being biologically female, a fact which was only discovered upon his death from consumption in 1901. Few of his artworks survive; a plaster portrait of the artist Joseph Frank Currier is currently held by the Museum of Fine Arts, Boston.

== Early life ==
Hall was born in Massachusetts in 1860 to John R. Hall, an architect, and Caroline Winslow Hall (née Barrett). His mother was an artist as well, and his father was the architect of the Hollis Street Theatre. Hall traveled to Europe with his mother at 17 to study art, and spent much of the rest of his life in France and Italy.

At the Brera Academy in Milan, Hall found a liking for the pants and jackets worn by students, and began wearing masculine clothing in everyday life. It was also at Brera that Hall met Giuseppina Boriani, and they began to travel Italy together around six years before Hall's death. Hall assumed the name "Charles" during this time, and he and Boriani traveled as husband and wife.

=== Relationship with Giuseppina Boriani ===
Various sources have described Hall's relationship with Giuseppina Boriani (sometimes known as Josephine or Giuseppina Boriana) as a lesbian relationship or a close sisterhood. The two traveled together for years, first under the guise of brother and sister, then as husband and wife. On their last journey together, Boriani was listed as "Mrs. Charles Winslow Hall" in the ship's manifest. Boriani believed at the time of Hall's death that he would leave some of his extensive wealth to her. Most descriptions of their relationship imply a romantic connection.

== Death and discovery ==
In 1901, a year after Hall's mother died, Hall and Boriani planned to travel to Boston together so that he could see his father, who was around 80 at the time. They booked passage aboard the steamship Citta di Torino sailing from Genoa to Boston.

As the Citta di Torino neared Boston, Hall grew ill, eventually calling for the ship's surgeon. Upon examining Hall, the surgeon discovered his chest binding, and both Hall and Boriani begged him to keep it secret. The surgeon decided to inform the captain of Hall's sex, although it seems no other passengers were notified. In spite of the surgeon's treatment, Hall died on September 29, 1901, before the ship reached port in Boston. Hall's illness was described as consumption, although it is unclear whether this was caused by tuberculosis.

Hall's family was notified of his death upon the Citta di Torino's arrival in Boston on October 1, and his body was collected by his cousin. At this point, the story broke in local newspapers, who described Hall as an eccentric or insane woman masquerading as a man. The family held a private funeral, to which Boriani was invited.

Most of those close to the story refused to speak to journalists; however, Boriani was interviewed via an interpreter, and Hall's father attributed his lifestyle to a desire to emulate famously lesbian artist Rosa Bonheur. The story was reported in several newspapers around the country and printed alongside stories of other "masquerading" or "passing women" in the years following.

=== Gender identity ===
Some contemporary sources refer to Hall as a woman, while modern sources refer to Hall variously as a man or a lesbian woman. How Hall may have identified himself is unknown, but at the time of his death, he did not wish his female biological sex to be known.
