= Chuck Hall =

Chuck Hall may refer to:

- Chuck Hall (Florida politician) (1918–1974), inaugural mayor of Metropolitan Dade County (1964–1970), and mayor of Miami Beach (1971–1974)
- Chuck Hall (Oklahoma politician), mayor of Perry, Oklahoma (2007–2013), current member of the Oklahoma Senate from the 20th district (2019–present)
