= Charles Hall (cricketer, born 1906) =

English cricketer

Charles Henry Hall (5 April 1906 – 11 December 1976) was an English first-class cricketer, who played 23 games for Yorkshire County Cricket Club between 1928 and 1934. He also appeared for the Yorkshire Second XI during this time.

Born in York, England, Hall was a right arm medium fast bowler, who took 45 wickets at 27.24, with a best of 6 for 71 against Middlesex. He had another fine match against Leicestershire, bagging 5 for 27. As a right-handed batsman, Hall scored 67 runs at 5.15, with a top score of 15 not out. He also took 11 catches in the field.

Hall died in December 1976 in Upper Poppleton, Yorkshire, England.
