= Charles King Hall =

English composer and church organist

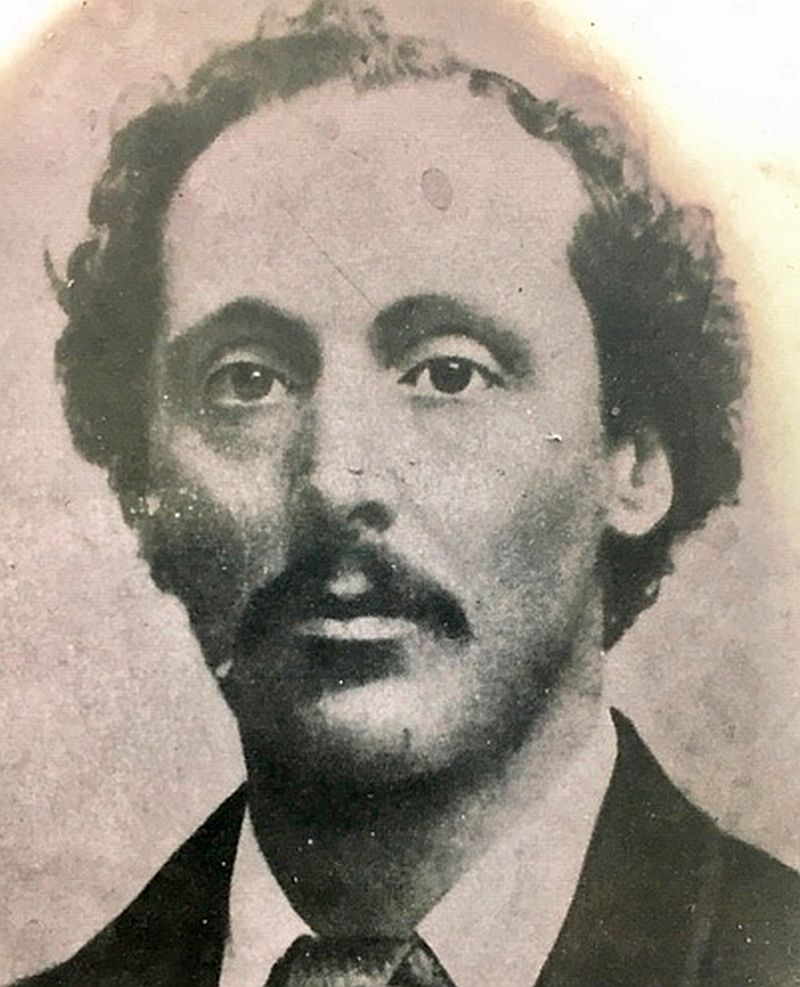
Charles King Hall, circa 1880

Charles King Hall (1845–1895), often credited as King Hall, was an English composer and church organist in Victorian London. He favored sentimental ballads, dance music, organ and piano pieces, and "much church music." He also specialized in arranging for the keyboard and voice the works of famous composers such as Handel, Gounod and Mendelssohn. Active in the London theatre, he contributed regularly to the German Reed Entertainments at St. George's Hall, Langham Place. King Hall's entry in A Biographical Dictionary of Musicians calls his German Reed operettas "his most popular works."

== Early life and family ==
Charles King Hall was born 17 August 1845, St Pancras, London. His father, Charles Frederick Hall (1815–1874), was a violinist who served as the musical director of the Adelphi Theatre and the music conductor of the Princess's Theatre in London. King Hall's mother, Eleanor Eliza Jane Vining, came from a family of well-known dramatic and comedic actors. King Hall's cousins included the English actor and stage manager George Vining (1824–1875) as well as the American actors Fanny Vining Davenport and her son, Harry Davenport.

In February 1867, when King Hall was 21 years old, he was initiated into Enoch Masonic Lodge #11. The ceremony took place at the Freemasons' Hall, London on Great Queen Street. The newspaper covering the event described King Hall as "the promising young Professor of Music, and son of the well-known conductor at the Princess's Theatre." King Hall's father, Charles Frederick Hall, took part in the banquet's entertainment that followed his son's initiation.

In 1876, King Hall married Isabel Maud Penton (1852–1932) at All Saints Church, Gordon Square.

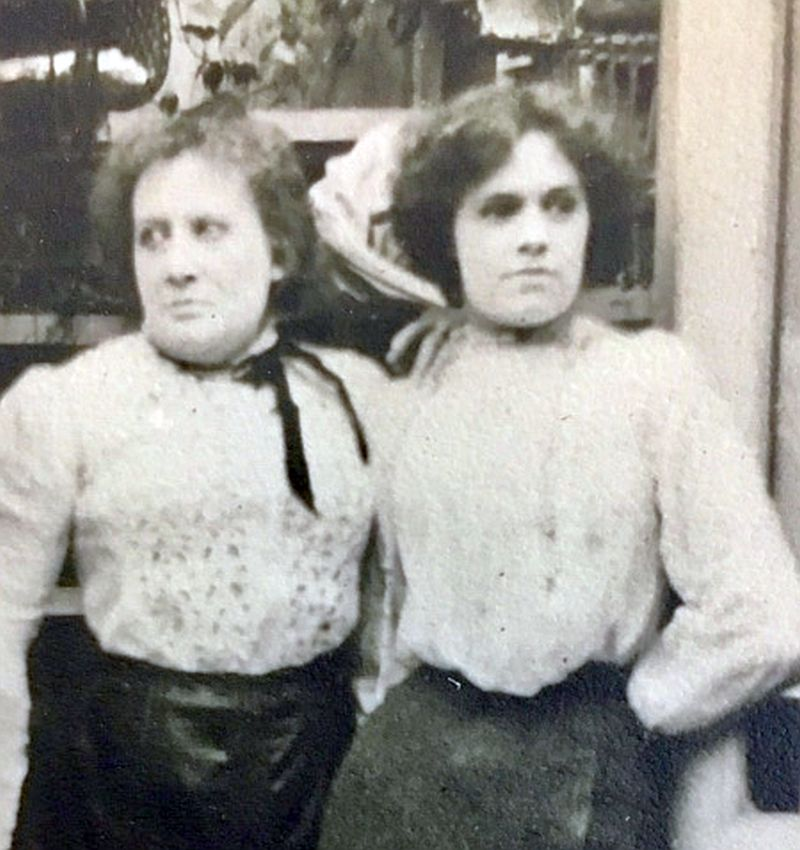
King Hall's widow, Isabel, and youngest daughter, Grace, circa 1900

They had five children. The eldest, Edith Jane Gertrude King-Hall (1877–1963), is sometimes confused with the Edith King Hall (1864-1933) who wrote children's books. (That author was the daughter of naval officer Sir William King Hall.) The composer's younger son, Ernest Vincent King-Hall (1885–1941) was a Royal Navy officer who married Hylda May Shallard, a chorister in the D'Oyly Carte Opera Company from 1907 to 1909; he died during the Second World War. King Hall's remaining three children were Lucy Harriet Greenfield King-Hall (1879–1900), Frederick Charles William King-Hall (1880–1963) and Grace Isabel King-Hall (1881–1960).

== Career and later years ==
King Hall composed both sacred and secular music, especially sentimental ballads and organ voluntaries. He contributed regularly to the popular German Reed Entertainments at St. George's Hall, Langham Place. His obituary in The Musical Times called his German Reed music "his most popular works". Kurt Gänzl wrote that King Hall's music was "pretty [and] forgettable." Yet, it gave steady, reliable satisfaction over the course of nearly twenty years with the Reeds. King Hall collaborated with such librettists as Arthur Law, F. C. Burnand, Gilbert Arthur à Beckett, Walter Frith and J. Comyns Carr, composing the scores for Foster Brothers (1877), A Happy Bungalow (1877), Doubleday's Will (1878), A Tremendous Mystery (1878), The Artful Automaton (1878), Grimstone Grange (1879), A Christmas Stocking (1879–1880), A Merry Christmas (1880–1881), A Strange Host (1882–1883), The Naturalist (1887), The Verger (1889–1890) and Missing (1894). Most of these entertainments were accompanied by piano and harmonium only.

King Hall was a prodigious composer throughout his career. From 1867 ("Golden Moments Gallop for the Pianoforte") to the year of his death ("An Emblem of Life; A Duet for Female Voices"), his work appeared regularly in both England and America. Examples of King Hall's original compositions include his score for Edward Oxenford's humorous cantata Beauty and the Beast (1890), published by the London firm of Hutchings & Romer, and his series of six "society dances" published by Joseph Williams in the 1890s.

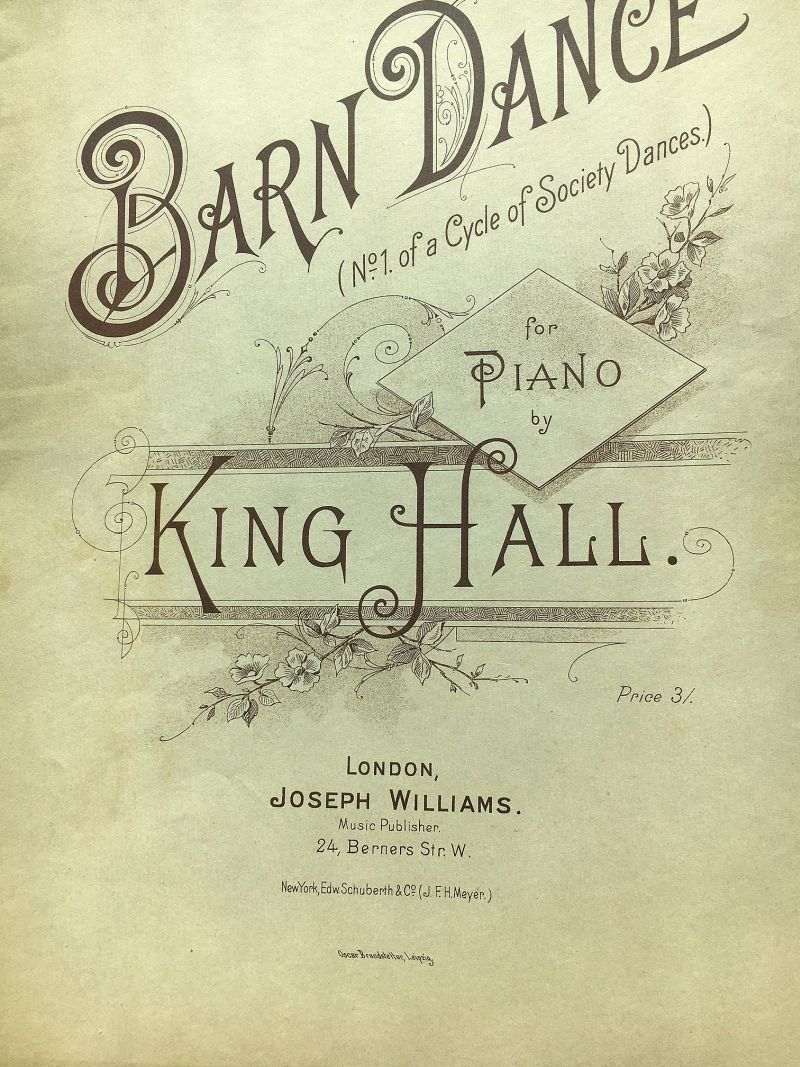
"Barn Dance," the first of King Hall's society dances, circa 1890

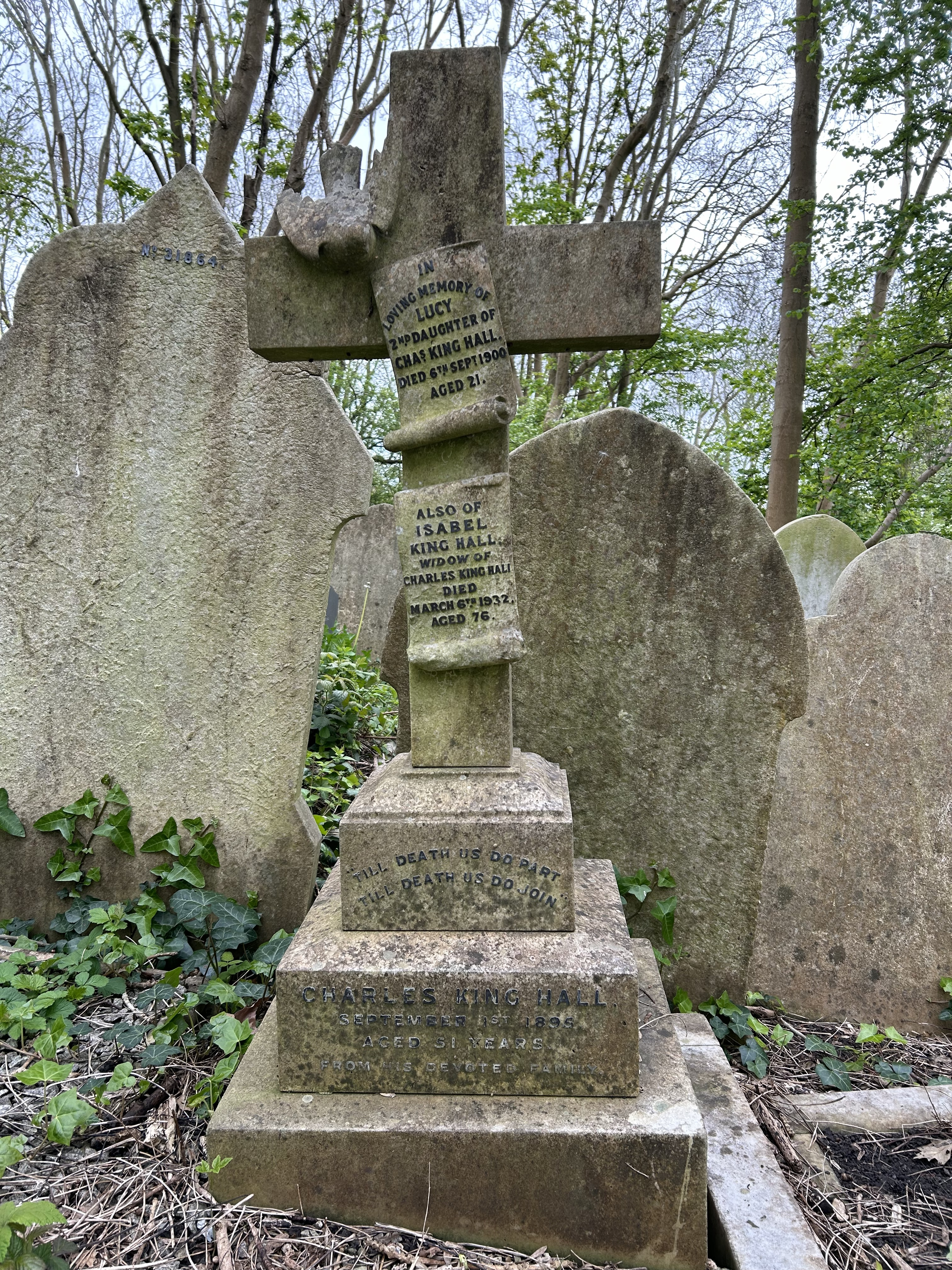
Grave of Charles King Hall in Highgate Cemetery

King Hall also supported his family as an organist, teacher, composer, and consultant to Chappell & Co., who published much of King Hall's sheet music. In the 1890s Chappell's Vocal Library numbered quite a few of King Hall's vocal arrangements and organ transcriptions, including "On Angels' Wings" (from Viviani's Silver Trumpets), "Mighty Lord" (from Gounod's Marche Religieuse), and "Soft and Low" (from Gounod's Mock Doctor). He specialized in arranging for piano and voice the theatre scores of other British composers, such as Arthur Sullivan's Haddon Hall and Ernest Ford's Jane Annie. Examples of his adaptations were Alfred Cellier's "Andante Pastorale", which King Hall arranged for the organ in 1892 and Arthur Sullivan's Imperial March, which King Hall transcribed for the organ in 1893.

King Hall also wrote two primers for Estey Organ, the American maker of reed organs and harmoniums. Both were published in 1880. He included in the organ primer his own testimonial for the instrument, saying "The tone of the Stops individually is mellow and sweet, and entirely free from the harshness which so frequently characterizes Reed Instruments; while the ensemble stresses solidity and fulness, and resembles very closely that of a thoroughly good Pipe Organ." That same year, King Hall wrote a short piece for a popular girls' magazine about the challenge of playing the harmonium, urging frustrated novices to persevere and "not let your disappointment keep you from trying again." King Hall was one of the few English composers writing specifically for the harmonium at the time.

As church organist, King Hall served the Anglican parishes of St. Paul's, Camden Square, badly damaged in the Second World War; St. Luke's, Kentish Town, declared redundant in 1991 but reopened in 2011; and Christ Church, Brondesbury, now Christ Church with Saint Laurence Brondesbury. A newspaper review of one of King Hall's organ concerts in December 1884, in which the organist "gave evident delight to his audience," refers to him as the organist and choir director of St Clement Danes on the Strand in the city of Westminster, London, as well as "of the Royal Albert Hall."

On 1 September 1895, King Hall died of throat cancer at the age of 50 at his home in Islington. He was buried in Highgate Cemetery. A notice of his death in a Scottish newspaper recalled King Hall's "connection with the old German Reeds’ entertainment, to which he contributed a large number of operettas and musical sketches."
