= Treehouse Hotel London =

Hotel in London, United Kingdom

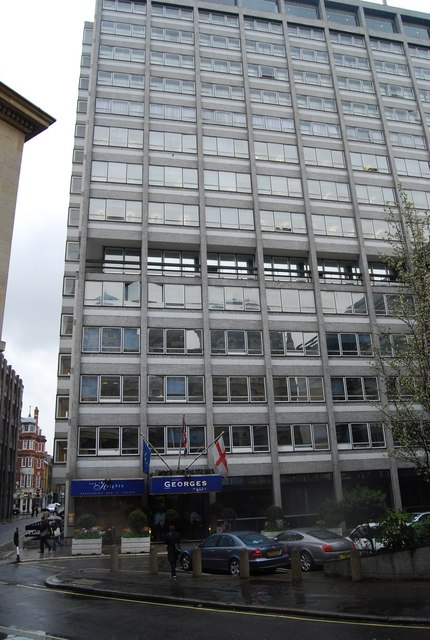

- Location within London Borough of Camden

General information
- Location: Central London, England
- Coordinates: 51°31′5″N 0°8′33″W
- Owner: Cairn Group
- Operator: SH Hotels & Resorts

Technical details
- Floor count: 15

Design and construction
- Architects: Sir John Burnet Tait Wilson & Partners

Other information
- Number of rooms: 95
- Number of suites: 15

The Treehouse Hotel London is a hotel on the corner of Langham Place and Riding House Street in Central London, England. The hotel is located on the upper floors of Henry Wood House.

== History ==
Henry Wood House is located on the site of the Queen's Hall, the original location of the BBC Proms. The hall was bombed out in 1941. The mixed-use complex was named for Sir Henry Wood, longtime conductor of the Proms. It was designed by Eric A. Blade of Sir John Burnet, Tait, Wilson & Partners, and was developed by the Crown Estate. It was constructed from 1961-1963 by John Laing & Sons and opened in 1964, with offices of the BBC’s Research and Development division on the lower levels, and a hotel on the upper six levels, with the lobby and restaurant at the top. It was originally the St. George's Hotel, managed by Trust_Houses_Ltd, and operated under that name until 2019, when the structure was renovated, and the hotel portion was renamed Treehouse Hotel London.

The 95 guest rooms of the hotel occupy floors 9 to 14.

Treehouse Hotel is operated by SH Hotels & Resorts. p
