= List of Food Wars!: Shokugeki no Soma chapters =

The Food Wars!: Shokugeki no Soma manga is written by Yūto Tsukuda and published by Shueisha in Weekly Shōnen Jump and Jump Giga! for its 3-part epilogue. It began as a one-shot in April 2012 and then began as a series in November 2012 and then ended in June 2019.

== Volume list ==
No.	Title	Original release date	English release date
1	Endless Wilderness; Hate naki kōya (果て無き荒野)	April 4, 2013; 978-4-08-870721-1	August 5, 2014; 978-1-4215-7254-3
Start of the arc "Introduction". (volumes 1-2/chapters 1-13/episodes 1-7): 1. "Endless Wilderness" (果て無き荒野, "Hate naki kōya"); 2. "Divine Tongue" (神の舌, "Kami no Shita"); 3. "'Morphing' Furikake" (『化ける』ふりかげ, ""Bakeru" Furikake"); 4. "The Godfather Speaks of Diamonds" (魔王、『玉』を語る, "Maō, "gyoku" o kataru"); 5. "The Chef Who Never Smiles" (この料理人は笑わない, "Kono Ryōrijin wa Warawanai"); Special Short: "Food Wars!: Shokugeki no Soma" (食戟のソーマ: 読み切り版, "Shokugeki no SOMA: Yomikiri-ban"); Side Story: "Kurase's Diary" (番外編『倉瀬さんの日記』, "Bangaihen: Kurase-san no nikki")
At Yukihira Family Restaurant, teenager Soma Yukihira aspires to someday beat his father Joichiro in a cook-off. A woman tries to persuade Soma to sell their property so her clients can build a high rise. She challenges Soma to cook for her a meat dish, but she has the place vandalized and the meat spoiled. Soma improvizes a near-meat dish that overwhelms her in taste. Later, Joichiro closes the restaurant to go on a worldwide cooking tour, and has Soma enroll in Totsuki Saryo Culinary Institute, an elite cooking academy. Erina Nakiri, the valedictorian of Totsuki's junior high and a member of Totsuki's Council of Ten Masters, presides over the transfer student entrance exam and has candidates cook an egg dish that would satisfy her. While other candidates flee because of Erina's reputation of being the nation's top food critic, Soma cooks a furikake dish that Erina discovers she really enjoys. However, because Soma is a commoner, she fails him anyway. At the school's entrance ceremony, Soma appears as the sole transfer student representative and declares he will aspire to be the top student in his class, angering his classmates, and shocking Erina. In his first class, Soma is paired with Megumi Tadokoro, a shy girl who ranked at the bottom of her class and is on academic probation. Although some of their classmates sabotage Soma and Megumi's beef bourguignon, Soma is able to save the dish and the teacher gives them a top grade. The bonus story was the one-shot that originally ran in Jump Next's 2012 issue where Erina, a top student and teacher at the academy, has the student Soma compete in a cook-off against one of her top student chefs. The side story briefly covers the perspective of Soma's childhood friend Mayu Kurase, who has been admiring Soma from a distance.
2	The Ice Queen and the Spring Storm; Kōri no joō to haru no arashi (氷の女王と春の嵐)	June 4, 2013; 978-4-08-870762-4	October 7, 2014; 978-1-4215-7255-0
Start of the arc "Training Camp". (volumes 2-5/chapters 14-34/episodes 8-15): 6. "Maria of Polaris" (極星の聖母, "Kyokusei no Maria"); 7. "Lawless Land" (無法地帯, "Muhō Chitai"); 8. "The Dish That Summons Spring" (春を呼ぶ皿, "Haru o yobu sara"); 9. "The Ice Queen and the Spring Storm" (氷の女王と春の嵐, "Kōri no joō to haru no arashi"); 10. "The Conqueror of Meat" (肉の侵略者, "Niku no shinryakusha"); 11. "The Eve of Battle" (対決前夜, "Taiketsu zen'ya"); 12. "On The Battlefield" (戦場に臨む, "Senjō ni nozomu"); 13. "The Quiet Bowl, the Eloquent Bowl" (静かなる丼、雄弁な丼, "Shizukanaru don, yūben'na don"); 14. "Megumi's Garden" (惠の庭, "Megumi no Niwa")
Soma goes to Polaris Dormitory where he uses leftovers to cook a mackerel burger to satisfy the dorm matron Fumio to secure a room. His dormmates have a welcome party. Satoshi Isshiki, an eccentric second-year student and the seventh seat on the Council of Ten, has Soma cook something for him; Soma makes a seer fish chazuke using the poêle (pan-seared) style. Isshiki explains to Soma what it takes to challenge for a seat on the Council of Ten, and how shokugeki battles work in general; meanwhile, Erina defeats the leader of the Chankonabe Society in such a battle. Soma visits the Donburi Bowl Research Society, on the verge of losing their club, and accepts a shokugeki battle against Ikumi Mito, a meat specialist. Mito cooks an A5 wagyu roti bowl, but Soma cooks a Chaliapin steak bowl, and wins the competition. Polaris's first-year students are invited to attend a Friendship & Team Building Cooking Camp, but it is reputed to be one of the main weeding out programs.
3	The Perfect Recette; Shijō no rusetto (至上のルセット)	August 2, 2013; 978-4-08-870787-7	December 2, 2014; 978-1-4215-7256-7
15. "Friction and the Elite" (摩擦と選良, "Masatsu to Senryō"); 16. "A Concerto of Creativity and Creation" (発想と創造の協奏曲, "Hassō to sōzō no kyōsōkyoku"); 17. "The Splendor that Cloaks the Mountain" (山を彩る衣, "Yama o irodoru koromo"); 18. "The Seed of an Idea" (アイデアの種, "Aidea no tane"); 19. "Sparking Souls" (火花散る魂, "Hibana Chiru Tamashii"); 20. "Declaration" (宣告, "Senkoku"); 21. "The Perfect Recette" (至上のルセット, "Shijō no rusetto"); Special Short: "Your and My Romance Counseling" (キミと私の恋愛相談, Kimi to watashi no ren'ai sōdan); Side Story: "Cuoco in Italia"
The first-year students attend the cooking camp at the Totsuki Resort, but they must pass the strict assignments of the Totsuki alumni, who can fire (and thus expel) students for any reason. Japanese cuisine alumni Hinako Inui has the students work in pairs to cook a dish using only ingredients found on the premises. Soma meets twin brothers Takumi Aldini and Isami Aldini, who had cooked at their uncle's restaurant in Italy. While the brothers cook a duck dish, Soma uses Megumi's cracker snacks to make breading for his fish. Hinako passes both pairs but declares their internal competition a draw. For the evening dishes, they have to prepare 50 servings of their dishes for the bodybuilding club and other athletic groups. Soma meets Gin Dojima, the head of the Totsuki Resort. The next day, Megumi is fired by alumni Kojiro Shinomiya, but Soma stands up for her and challenges Shinomiya to a shokugeki. The bonus story is Shun Saeki's debut work: High school boy Kobayakawa wants to confess to school beauty Yui Kawai, but when the time comes, he chickens out and says he has a crush on the other school beauty Asuka Kawashima. Yui volunteers to teach him how to romance Asuka. The side story covers the Aldini brothers when their uncle has them enroll in Totsuki.
4	Resemblances; Sono omokage (その面影)	September 4, 2013; 978-4-08-870822-5	February 3, 2015; 978-1-4215-7257-4
22. "The Graduates" (卒業生達, "Sotsugyōsei tachi"); 23. "Proof of Existence" (存在の証明, "Sonzai no shōmei"); 24. "The Magician from the East" (東から来た魔術師, "Azuma kara kita majutsushi"); 25. "Resemblances" (その面影, "Sono omokage"); 26. "Memory of a Dish" (ひと皿の記憶, "Hito sara no kioku"); 27. "The Bitterness of Defeat" (敗北の苦み, "Haiboku no Nigami"); 28. "No Time for Sleep" (誰も寝てはならぬ, "Dare mo nete wa naranu"); 29. "Eggs Before Dawn" (夜明け前の卵たち, "Yoake mae no tamago tachi"); 30. "The Pitfall of Assumption" (想定の陥穽, "Sōtei no Kansei")
Gin Dojima arranges for the unofficial match between Soma and Shinomiya on the condition that Megumi be the head chef and that Soma can only serve the assistant. Using the leftover ingredients from the previous assignments of the day, Shinomiya makes a chou farci (cabbage roll), while Megumi makes a rainbow terrine made of preserved vegetables. Although the judges initially favor Shinomiya's dish, Dojima pitches an extra vote for Megumi's dish, telling Shinomiya that his cooking has become stagnant. Shinomiya tries Megumi's dish and is moved by memories of his mother, so the match is declared a draw, and Megumi is reinstated. The next major assignment is to prepare 200 servings of an egg dish to be accepted at a breakfast buffet where the judges are the resorts' ingredient suppliers, the chefs and service staff, and their families. While Takumi, Erina and Megumi complete serving their dishes, Soma has yet to start.
5	The Dancing Chef; Odoru Ryōrinin (踊る料理人)	December 4, 2013; 978-4-08-870855-3	April 7, 2015; 978-1-4215-7385-4
Start of the arc "Karaage Wars". (volume 5/chapters 35-38/episodes 17-18): 31. "Metamorphosis" (メタモルフォーゼ, "Metamorufuoze"); 32. "The Dancing Chef" (踊る料理人, "Odoru Ryōrinin"); 33. "To Future Foes" (いずれ戦う者たちへ, "Izure Takakaumono Tachi e"); 34. "Ties to Totsuki" (遠月を巡る因縁, "Tōtsuki O Meguru Inen"); 35. "Fantastic Fried Chicken (1)" (官能の唐揚げ(1), "Kannō no Karaage (1)"); 36. "Fantastic Fried Chicken (2)" (官能の唐揚げ(2), "Kannō no Karaage (2)"); 37. "Fantastic Fried Chicken (3)" (官能の唐揚げ(3), "Kannō no Karaage (3)"); 38. "Fantastic Fried Chicken (4)" (官能の唐揚げ(4), "Kannō no Karaage (4)"); 39. "The Chosen Ones" (選ばれし者, "Erabareshi mono"); Side Story: "Dig in to the Tastes Of Autumn!" (番外編『秋の味覚をおあがりよ!』, "Bangaihen: Aki no mikaku o oagari yo!")
Soma's initial try at a breakfast souffle fails to attract customers as it does not hold its shape, but he improvises and completes the task. He meets Alice Nakiri, Erina's cousin and rival. Gin Dojima and the Totsuki alumni host a dinner party to celebrate the students who have survived the camp. Soma misses the bus back to the academy and ends up riding with Erina. During the school break, Soma returns home to find that the local market district businesses are declining because of a train station booth that sells fast-food fried chicken. Enlisting the help of childhood friend Mayumi and Ikumi Mito, Soma makes a chicken dish that revives the business. Satoshi informs the Polaris Dorm residents about the next big event, the Fall Classic. Council member and culinary consultant Etsuya Eizan recruits Soma to join his business, but Soma refuses. The bonus story has Yuki, Megumi and Soma cooking some pike fish that Miss Fumio received.
6	Memories of Battle; Tatakai no kioku (斗いの記憶)	February 4, 2014; 978-4-08-880007-3	June 2, 2015; 978-1-4215-7688-6
Start of the arc "Tōtsuki Automn Election". (volumes 6-13/chapters 39-104/episodes 15-34): 40. "Homecoming" (帰還, "Kikan"); 41. "The Man Called "Shura"" (『修羅』と呼ばれだ男, "Syura to yobareda otoko"); 42. "A Wake-Up Kiss" (目覚めの口づけ, "Mezame no Kuchizuke"); 43. "The Chef Who Wandered the World" (万里を駆ける料理人, "Banri o Kakeru Ryōrinin"); 44. "Unexpected Straight Punch" (予想外のストレート, "Yosō-gai no sutorēto"); 45. "The Accompanist to Fragrance and Spice" (香りと刺激の伴奏者, "Kaori to Shigeki no Bansōsha"); 46. "Crouching Dragon Ascends" (龍は臥し、空へ昇る, "Ryu wa fushi, Sora e Noboru"); 47. "Memories of Battle" (斗いの記憶, "Tatakai no kioku"); 48. "The Unknown Knowns" (未知なる既知, "Michi naru kichi"); Side Story: "Miss Nikumi's Midsummer Fun" (番外編 「真夏の肉魅さん」, "Bangaihen: Manatsu no Nikumi-san")
The participants for the Fall Classic are announced. Joichiro visits Polaris Dorm; he and Gin were famous alumni there. Joichiro and Soma have another cooking challenge with the theme being a breakfast dish that revitalizes someone who has pulled an all-nighter. With the Fall Classic preliminary contest subject being curry dishes, Soma and Megumi visit Professor Jun Shiomi and her assistant Akira Hayama to learn about ways to prepare the different curry spices. A month passes as the students prepare for the Classic. Dean Senzaemon explains that only four chefs from each of the two 30-person blocks will qualify for the Fall Classic main tournament. Eizan brings as the judges the twin granddaughters of one of the top curry food businesses, and the preliminaries are underway. In the side story, Soma visits the Donburi Bowl Society and brings a shaved ice machine.
7	Wolf Pack; Gunrō (群狼)	April 4, 2014; 978-4-08-880044-8	August 11, 2015; 978-1-4215-7965-8
49. "Wolf Pack" (群狼, "Gunrō"); 50. "Beyond the Ordinary" (日常を越えるもの, "Nichijō o koeru mono"); 51. "A Witch's Dinner Table" (魔女の食卓, "Majo no Shokutaku"); 52. "To Serve Beauty" (花に仕える者, "Hana ni tsukaeru mono"); 53. "The Man From the Frozen North" (寒い国からやってきた男, "Samui Kuni kara yatekita Otoko"); 54. "The Burgeoning Flower of Competition" (花開く個の競演, "Hana Hiraku Ko no Kyōen"); 55. "Bridging the Gap with Knowledge" (知が穿つ穴, "Chi ga Ugatsu Ana"); 56. "Tuscany Moon" (トスカナの月, "Tosukana no Tsuki"); 57. "Her Memories" (彼女の思い出, "Kanojo no Omoide")
The students make curry dishes for the Fall Classic preliminaries. In Block B, Chinese cuisine specialist Miyoko Hojo does not like that Megumi won a shokugeki because of Soma's help. The panel of judges include some harsh critics who have been giving scores totaling under 50 out of a possible 100. Creepy stalker chef Nao Sadatsuka shocks the judges with a disgusting smelling but good tasting black laksa curry, scoring an 84. Nao's rival and Erina's aide Hisako Arato upstages her with a Si Wu Tang curry based on Chinese medicine and scores a 92. In Block A, Alice's aide Ryo Kurokiba scores a 93 with his French lobster curry. Ikumi Mito's dongpo pork curry bowl scores an 86; Ryoko Sakaki's bean curry with natto also scores an 86; Marui's potage blanc curry udon scores an 88; Zenji Marui's smoked curry scores an 88. In Block B, Yuki's duck cutlet curry scores an 86; Isami Aldini's calzone scores 87, tying Miyako Hojo's curry fried rice; Takumi Aldini's pasta embedded in parmesan cheese scores a 90. Alice's peculiar looking dish scores a 95, and Megumi's monkfish dobujiru curry scores an 88.
8	Put Your Heart Into It; Kokorō o Nōseru (心をのせる)	July 4, 2014; 978-4-08-880138-4	October 6, 2015; 978-1-4215-7966-5
58. "Holy Aroma" (聖なる香り, "Seinaru Kaori"); 59. "A Weapon for Each" (それぞれの武器, "Sorezore no Buki"); 60. "Warriors' Feast" (戦士たちの宴, "Senshi-tachi no utage"); 61. "Put Your Heart Into It" (心をのせる, "Kokoro o Noseru"); 62. "Enter the Best" (強者見参, "Tsuwamono kenzan"); 63. "Plots" (たくらみ, "Takurami"); 64. "On the Edge" (オンザエッジ, "On Za Ejji"); 65. "The Evolution of the Boxed Lunch" (弁当進化論, "Bentō shinka-ron"); "Erina's Summer Vacation" (夏休みのエリナ, "Natsuyasumi no Erina") (Note: The side story "Erina's Summer Vacation" was originally published in Weekly Shonen Jump 2014 issue 4/5 along with chapter 53; however due to size constraints, it was moved to Vol. 8 of the graphic novel)
Akira Hayama's fish-head curry soupe en croute (with a pot pie cover made of naan bread) scores a 94. Soma's curry risotto omurice scores a 93, but three of the five individual scores were higher than Akira's. An unnamed student knocks Zenji Marui and Shun Ibusaki out of the competition. Polaris Dorm celebrates the first-years success at the preliminaries with a party. Satoshi Isshiki takes Soma and Megumi to help teach making fried pot stickers to a group of preschool-to-second grade kids. The first quarterfinals pits Soma against Alice with the theme being a bento. The day before the competition, Soma has Ryoko try out some of his trials. Alice presents temari (ball-shaped) sushi in her bento. Soma presents a seaweed-based bento, and is reminded of his past when he was helping deliver a bento to an elderly woman. In the side story, Erina and Alice visit a public pool, while the Polaris Dorm girls try to make do with a small inflatable one.
9	Diamond Generation "Gyoku" no sedai (『玉』の世代)	September 4, 2014; 978-4-08-880176-6	December 1, 2015; 978-1-4215-8028-9
66. "What Belongs in the Box" (その箱に詰めるもの, "Sono hako ni tsumeru mono"); 67. "Light Side, Dark Side" (交錯する光と影, "Kōsaku suru hikari to kage"); 68. "Bay Town Battle" (『港町』の決戦, "Minatomachi no kessen"); 69. "Ruler of the Kitchen" (厨房の独裁者, "Chūbō no dokusaisha"); 70. "Polar Opposites" (対極, "Taikyoku"); 71. "Bravery and Determination" (『勇気』と『覚悟』, ""Yūki" to "Kakugo""); 72. "Diamond Generation" (『玉』の世代, ""Gyoku" no sedai"); 73. "The Devil Is in the Details" (細いを穿つ, "Sai o ugatsu"); 74. "Delicate Monster" (敏感怪獣, "Binkan kaijū")
Soma wins over the judges with his bento, using a gastronomical technique to shape the seaweed into pearl-sized balls and adding kuzu sauce so it is like a treasure chest of flavors. In the second quarterfinals, Megumi Tadokoro and Ryo Kurokiba prepare ramen; both choose a seafood as their foundation, having worked in towns near ports. Ryo's soupe de poisson lobster ramen packs a punch, while Megumi's kozuyu chicken soy sauce ramen with scallop stock has a different impact. Ryo ultimately wins and advances. Soma meets Subaru Mimasaka, his upcoming opponent. The third quarterfinal match puts Hisako Arato against Akira Hayama with the theme of hamburgers. Akira uses a doner kebab as his meat, but Hisako makes hers out of a freshly butchered turtle.
10	Conditions For Battle; Shōbu no jōken (勝負の条件)	November 4, 2014; 978-4-08-880212-1	February 2, 2016; 978-1-4215-8446-1
75. "Under the Mask" (仮面の下, "Kamen no shita"); 76. "Duel Etiquette" (決闘の作法, "Kettō no sahō"); 77. "Tracer" (追跡者, "Tsuisekisha"); 78. "The Thin Line of Defense" (紙一重の攻防, "Kamihitoe no kōbō"); 79. "The Final Trump Card" (最後の"切り札", "Saigo no Kādo"); 80. "Conditions For Battle" (勝負の条件, "Shōbu no jōken"); 81. "The Observers Arrive" (観察者、来る, "Kansatsusha, kitaru"); 82. "Starting Line" (スタートライン, "Sutato Rain"); 83. "The Chaser and the Chased" (追う者と追われる者, "Ou mono to owareru mono")
Akira Hayama's kebab burger wins over the judges as he defeats Hisako Arato. Subaru Mimasaka insults Takumi's brother, provoking him into turning their quarterfinal match into a shokugeki in which Takumi wagers his mezzaluna knife. As Takumi prepares a lemon semifreddo dessert, Subaru prepares the same exact dish, having stalked Takumi's preparations and practices. Takumi is forced to change his recipe, pulling out his family's reserve olive oil, however, Subaru has even anticipated that move and counters it with preserved lemon zest for the win. Afterwards, Subaru plans to challenge Soma into wagering his kitchen knife in the semifinals, but Soma increases the stakes by wagering quitting being a chef against Subaru's 100 trophy knives, with the dish theme being beef stew. Student journalist Mitsuru Sotsuda wants to do an exclusive feature on Soma; he is initially declined, but later helps Soma taste test his creations. Soma tries to figure out how to make it better and resorts to asking Erina to taste test. The side story, Erina learns about shojo manga.
11	The Sun Always Rises; Asa wa mata kuru (朝はまた来る)	March 4, 2015; 978-4-08-880318-0	April 5, 2016; 978-1-4215-8445-4
84. "Hidden Themes" (隠された課題, "Kakusareta kadai"); 85. "The Secret of the First Bite" (一口目の秘密, "Hitokuchime no himitsu"); 86. "Garnishes" (ガルニーチュール, "Garunīchūru"); 87. "Secret Measures" (秘策, "Hisaku"); 88. "A Land of Dreams" (~夢の国~, "~Yume no kuni~"); 89. "The Sun Always Rises" (朝はまた来る, "Asa wa mata kuru"); 90. "Iron Will, Steel Heart" (鉄の意志、鋼の心, "Tetsu no ishi, hagane no kokoro"); 91. "Ravenous Beasts" (喰らいあう獣, "Kurai au kemono"); 92. "Fire Starter" (発火装置(ファイアスターター), "Hakka sōchi (faiasutātā)")
After Erina refuses to taste Soma's dish, thinking it to be beneath her, Soma ponders her reaction, and comes up with a strategy. In the first semifinals, with some of the alumni from the cooking camp returning as judges, Soma prepares a beef stew based on oxtail, and Subaru quickly counters with his imitation and improvement. Mitsuru Sotsuda discovers that Subaru had hacked his computer to get his notes on Soma. However, Soma improvizes by bringing out a number of other meats and by preparing them in different ways. Subaru's dish impresses the judges, however, Soma's dish with the mix of meats is likened to enjoying a roller coaster at an amusement park, and the judges rule in favor of Soma. Despite losing, Subaru is asked by Soma to continue at the school but not to take away the chefs' pride anymore because ultimately the chef must continue cooking despite any setbacks and failures. The other semifinal match is a battle between two strong-willed aides: Akira Hayama and Ryo Kurokiba. Akira presents an apicius-style duck dish, while Ryo presents eel matelote. The judges split the vote 2-2, but when judge Sonoka Kikuchi cannot decide, Gin Dojima declares the match a draw and has both contestants advance to compete in a three-way finals.
12	Moonlight Memories; Gekkou no kioku (月光の記憶)	April 3, 2015; 978-4-08-880331-9	June 7, 2016; 978-1-4215-8508-6
93. "Autumn's "Pike"" (秋を告げる〝刀〟, "Aki o tsugeru "katana""); 94. "Capture the Season" (旬をつかむ, "Shun o tsukamu"); 95. "Battle for the Season" (「旬」を巡る戦い, "`Shun' o meguru tatakai"); 96. "The Answer Found" (掴んだ答え, "Tsukanda kotae"); 97. "Moonlight Memories" (月光の記憶, "Gekkō no kioku"); 98. "Things Accumulated" (積んできた"モノ", "Tsunde kita" mono""); 99. "A Fang to Spearhead the Attack" (先陣をきる牙, "Senjin o kiru kiba"); 100. "A Sharp Point" (鋭き刃先, "Surudoki hasaki"); 101. "A Forged Blade" (鍛えた名刀, "Kitaeta meitō")
The theme for the Fall Classic finals is mackerel pike. Soma and Megumi visit a fish market and bump into Alice and Ryo. They have a brief contest over who can pick the better fresh fish, which Ryo wins. Soma ponders different aging strategies that could work to make up his comparative lack of experience in picking the fish using the methods from his Polaris Dorm roommates. The evening of the contest, the judges are announced to be Senzaemon Nakiri, Gin Dojima, and Alice's mother Leonora Nakiri. Ryo presents a pike cartoccio, a seafood pike dish wrapped in film which is comparable to acqua pazza. Akira presents a pike carpaccio, a dish that would normally serve as an appetizer. Soma presents a takikomi rice dish.
13	Stagiaire; Sutajiēru (スタジエール)	June 4, 2015; 978-4-08-880367-8	August 2, 2016; 978-1-4215-8509-3
Start of the arc "Stagiaire" (「スタジエール」, "Sutajiēru"). (volumes 13-14/chapters 105-116/episodes 35-37): 102. "Soma's Strength" (創真の"強さ", "Sōma no" tsuyosa""); 103. "Specialty" (スペシャリテ, Supesharite); 104. "New Diamonds" (新たなる『玉』, "Aratanaru "Gyoku""); 105. "Stagiaire" (スタジエール, "Sutajiēru"); 106. "A Busy Restaurant Drowning in Problems" (問題の多い繁忙店, "Mondai no ōi hanbōten"); 107. "Ideal Distance" (理想との距離, "Risō to no kyori"); 108. "Choose Your Path" (道を選ぶ, "Michi o erabu"); 109. "Those Who Shine" (光をあてる者, "Hikari o ateru mono"); "Special Short: Ryo Nakama's Food Wars!" (仲間りょう版「食戟のソーマ」, Nakama Ryō Ban "Shokugeki no Sōma"); "Side Story: Food Wars! Second Stomach! 1 and 2" (食戟のソーマ 別腹! (#1.#2), "Shoku No sōma betsubara! (#1.#2)")
Soma adds an ojiya to his takikomi rice dish. The judges select Akira Hayama to be the winner of the Fall Classic finals. Despite being runners-up, Soma and Ryo hang out with Akira to try to make his winning dish. The next assignment is called a stagiaire (intern or trainee) in which the first-year students work at different restaurants in the area doing minor chores such as waiting tables and washing dishes to prepping food, and must leave some sort of visible accomplishment at the place. Soma discovers that he and Hisako, who still feels unworthy to be Erina's aide, are going to be working together at a Western restaurant that gets an extremely high number of customers during certain periods. Although they get through the busy periods, they struggle to figure out how to leave a legacy there. Meanwhile, Megumi and Erina do their stagiaire at a French restaurant where Erina practically runs the place, Megumi worries about how she can leave her accomplishment. After scrapping an idea to reduce the menu size, Hisako and Soma convince the restaurant to implement a reservation-only system to best serve their customers, and with its success, they pass their stagiaire. Soma encourages Hisako to walk alongside Erina instead of following her. Soma's next stagiaire will be with Kojiro Shinomiya. In the bonus chapters, Isobe Isobee manga artist Ryo Nakama recreates Soma's entrance exam with Erina in his artwork. Takumi deals with bento offerings from interested girls. A story shows Fuyumi Mizuhara meeting Shinomiya for the first time and discovers he is a better cook than her even in her specialty of Italian food.
14	The Magician Returns! Majutsushi futatabi!! (魔術師再び─!!)	August 4, 2015; 978-4-08-880448-4	October 4, 2016; 978-1-4215-8655-7
Start of the arc "Moon Banquet Festival". (volumes 14-16/chapters 117-134/episodes 37-42): 110. "The Magician Returns!" (魔術師再び！！, "Majutsushi futatabi!!"); 111. "A Full-Course Meal" (コース料理, "Kōsu ryōri"); 112. "Signs of Growth" (成長への道標, "Seichō e no michishirube"); 113. "Forgotten Vegetables" (忘れられた野菜たち, "Wasure rareta yasai-tachi"); 114. "Yukihira, New and Improved" (ユキヒラ・改, "Yukihira kai"); 115. "Break Out" (ぶち破る, "Buchiyaburu"); 116. "The Fruit of Personal Growth" (成長という果実, "Seichō to iu kajitsu"); 117. "Commanding Presence" (威風堂々, "Ifudōdō"); 118. "The Council of Ten Masters" (遠月十傑, "Tōtsuki Jyukketsu")
Soma's next stagiaire assignment is working for Kojiro Shinomiya to open his new branch restaurant in Tokyo, and in order to pass he needs to create something original that will stay with the restaurant. They have a pre-opening event in which they test run their items on the menu. Soma falls behind in his first pre-opening day, prompting the other workers to have to pick up the slack. However, the next day he catches up and improves, even getting to complete a dish beyond just prepping. On the final day, Kojiro invites his former classmates and teachers, as well as his mother. Kojiro's chefs then create their own works which have a chance of being added to the menu. Soma serves a roasted quail poele dish that he considers a chicken and egg rice bowl. Although Kojiro considers Soma's dish to be low quality, he makes his version of it to add to the menu, implying that Soma has passed. As some of the first-years complete their stagiaires, Soma returns to field a bevy of shokugeki challenges, including one from skewer specialist Tetsuji Kabutoyama. An event called the Momiji Meet and Greet lets the eight Fall Classic qualifiers to meet the Council members.
15	The Moon Festival; Gekkyōsai (月饗祭)	October 3, 2015; 978-4-08-880486-6	December 6, 2016; 978-1-4215-8814-8
119. "The Council Stands Above" (十傑との距離, "Jyukketsu to no kyori"); 120. "One Monster Event" (怪物行事 (モンスターイベント), "Monsutā ibento"); 121. "Adoration for Spiciness" (辛味礼参, "Karami raisan"); 122. "Pepper and Chili" (｢麻｣ と ｢辣｣, "Mā to Rā"); 123. "Don't Fear the Heat" (辛さを恐れず, "Karasa o osorezu"); 124. "Singing the School Anthem" (校歌斉唱, "Kōka seishō"); 125. "The Moon Festival" (月饗祭, "Gekkyōsai"); 126. "Booth Battle Strategy Session" (屋台大作戦！, "Yatai dai-sakusen!"); 127. "Moonlight Whispers" (月光のささやき, "Gekkō no sasayaki"); "Food Wars! Second Stomach! 3 and 4" (食戟のソーマ 別腹! (#3.#4), "Shoku No sōma betsubara! (#3.#4)")
During the meet and greet between the Council of Ten and the first-year Fall Classic main event participants, eighth seat member Terunori Kuga tells them they have a long way to go before they can think about challenging anyone on the Council, but this inspires the first-years more. When Kuga mentions he will consider shokugeki if they can beat them in any type of cooking-related contest, Soma enters a booth in the school's Moon Festival, placing it adjacent to Kuga's Chinese Food Research Society. He learns that Kuga specializes in Sichuan Cuisine, leading an army of cooks that make an addictively spicy but delicious mapo tofu. He also learns that if he does not turn a profit, he will be expelled. With Megumi helping him, he tries some ideas and gets Erina's feedback, and presents a food cart with black pepper buns for the first day of the festival. However, Kuga's massive booth makes a huge profit while Soma's booth ends up in the red, along with Team Shiomi (Alice, Ryo, and Akira). Soma learns that The bonus chapters show the first-years in normal student life situations.
16	Captured Queen; Toraware no joō (囚われの女王)	January 4, 2016; 978-4-08-880583-2	February 7, 2017; 978-1-4215-9018-9
Start of the arc "Central". (volumes 16-19/chapters 135-171/episodes 43-50): 128. "Blindside" (死角, "Shikaku"); 129. "Lion vs. Lion" (獅子と獅子, "Shishi to shishi"); 130. "A Pride of Young Lions" (若き獅子たちの群れ, "Wakaki shishi-tachi no mure"); 131. "Waiting for That Certain Someone" (あの人を待ちわびて, "Ano hito o machiwabite"); 132. "The Power of the First Seat" (第一席の力, "Daiisseki no chikara"); 133. "A Dinner Table Swallowed by Shadow" (翳りゆく食卓, "Kageri yuku shokutaku"); 134. "Black Clouds Hide the Moon" (黒雲、月を覆う, "Kokuun, tsuki o ōu"); 135. "The Nakiri Family" (薙切の血族, "Nakiri no Ketsuzoku"); 136. "Captured Queen" (囚われの女王, "Toraware no joō")
Soma expands his offerings to include noodles made from the same dough as the buns, and slowly climbs up the rankings in profits. On the fourth day, he rolls out a bunch of benches and takes advantage of the frustrated customers in line for Kuga's restaurant by offering a mapo tofu dish combined with a lion's head meatball with curry. The customers start to defect to Soma's booth, but as it gets crowded, Subaru Mimasaka comes to help, reproducing the dish. Ikumi Mito and Takumi Aldini also join in to support, and the food cart clinches first place for that day. Afterwards, second seater Rindo Kobayashi invites Soma to try out first seater Eishi Tsukasa's work. Meanwhile, Team Shiomi turns a profit finally when Alice 3d prints chocolate designs to go with Ryo and Akira's dishes. Erina is shocked when she receives a visit from her father Azami Nakiri, who was banished from Totsuki. Azami announces he has taken over the school as the new dean by majority vote by the Council. He dismisses Hisako as Erina's aide. The now-retired Senzaemon tells Soma about Erina's past and asks him to save his granddaughter.
17	Making an Example; Miseshime (見せしめ)	March 4, 2016; 978-4-08-880628-0	April 4, 2017; 978-1-4215-9094-3
137. "A Flame of Hope" (希望の灯火, "Kibō no tomoshibi"); 138. "Erina Comes to Polaris" (えりな、極星寮へ, "Erina, Kyokuseiryō e"); 139. "Crumbling Institute" (崩れゆく学園, "Kuzure Yuku Gakuen"); 140. "Making an Example" (見せしめ, "Miseshime"); 141. "Reminiscence" (思い出, "Omoide"); 142. "The Ultimate Foul Play" (卑劣極まれり, "Hiretsu kiwamareri"); 143. "The Opening Volley Is Shot" (火蓋は切られた, "Hibuta wa kira reta"); 144. "The True Strength of the Alchemist" (錬金術師の実力, "Renkinjutsu-shi no jitsuryoku"); 145. "True Gourmet" (真の美食, "Shin no bishoku")
Senzaemon tells Soma to save Erina, who is restricted in her school activities and classes. Alice, Ryo, and Hisako help Erina escape and seek refuge at Polaris Dorm. Azama announces that all research societies and seminars are to be disbanded, and that the school will teach his curriculum from his organization known as Central. He orders the eviction of Polaris Dorm in ten days. Soma challenges Eizan to a shokukgeki, but Eizan has Soma watch his match against one of the societies where he has already bribed the judges to rule in Central's favor. While the other societies withdraw their challenges, Soma challenges Eizan anyway. The theme ingredient is Satsuma jidori (free-range) chicken. Eizan sends people to evict Polaris immediately and is met with resistance. Eizan serves his Hainanese chicken rice.
18	Begin the Counterattack! Hangeki kaishi! ! (反撃開始！！)	May 2, 2016; 978-4-08-880670-9	June 6, 2017; 978-1-4215-9334-0
146. "Secret Ingredient" (隠し味, "Kakushi aji"); 147. "Begin the Counterattack!" (反撃開始！！, "Hangeki kaishi! !"); 148. "Triumphant Return" (凱旋, "Gaisen"); 149. "Heaven and Hell" (天国と地獄, "Tengoku to jigoku"); 150. "Games" (ボードゲーム, "Bōdogēmu"); 151. "The War Begins" (開戦, "Kaisen"); 152. "Reconnaissance" (偵察へ, "Teisatsu e"); 153. "Hall of Death" (死の会場, "Shi no kaijō"); 154. "Baring Fangs" (牙を剥く, "Kiba o muku")
Banking on the judges' curiosity, Soma presents jidori chicken-wing pot stickers and persuades the judges to try them. The judges award Soma the match, thus canceling the eviction. As Polaris celebrates, Isshiki informs them that the societies can now challenge Central to be reinstated with fair judging. Azami visits the dorm as a Polaris alum, but instead of taking Erina back, he notes that he still has greater plans to rule. Erina is shocked to learn that Joichiro Saiba, the person she admired, is Soma's dad. After dismissing three Council members (including Isshiki), Central dispatches its Council members as well as its new recruits to battle in the society challenges, easily winning matches and disbanding clubs while the Polaris students and allies scout them out. The next shokugeki challenge is between the Cutting Edge Research Society (of which Alice became de facto president) member Ryo Kurokiba and Central's recruit member, Rentaro Kusunoki.
19	Those Who Reach for the Top; Itadaki o mezasu mono (頂を目指す者)	July 4, 2016; 978-4-08-880745-4	August 1, 2017; 978-1-4215-9335-7
155. "Maximum Power" (最大出力, "Saidai shutsuryoku"); 156. "Absolute Heat" (絶対"温"感, "Zettai "on"kan"); 157. "Dancing Salmon" (鮭は踊る, "Sake wa odoru"); 158. "The Difference" (その差, "Sono sa"); 159. "Growth" (成長, "Seichō"); 160. "Alice's Feelings" (アリスの想い, "Arisu no omoi"); 161. "Dueling Performance" (競演, "Kyōen"); 162. "Self" (私, "Watashi"); 163. "Those Who Reach for the Top" (頂を目指す者, "Itadaki o mezasu mono")
Ryo Kurokiba and Rentaro Kusunoki prepare salmon for their shokugeki.
20	Frozen Thoughts; Kōtteita omoi (凍っていた想い)	September 2, 2016; 978-4-08-880776-8	October 3, 2017; 978-1-4215-9435-4
Start of the arc "Promotion Exams". (volumes 20-31/chapters 172-263/episodes 51-73): 164. "Master and Apprentice" (師匠と弟子, "Shishō to deshi"); 165. "Two Faces" (二つの表情, "Futatsu no hyōjō"); 166. "Overwhelming" (圧倒, "Attō"); 167. "The Face You See" (浮かぶ顔と浮かぬ顔, "Ukabu kao to ukanu kao"); 168. "The Day They Met" (出会いの日, "Deai no hi"); 169. "Rematch" (リベンジ, "Ribenji"); 170. "Frozen Thoughts" (凍っていた想い, "Kōtteita omoi"); 171. "Follow Me" (フォロー ミー, "Forō mī"); 172. "To the Battlefield" (いざ戦いの地へ, "Iza tatakai no chi e"); "Food Wars! Second Stomach! 5" (食戟のソーマ 別腹! #5, "Shoku No sōma betsubara! #5")
21	The Tōtsuki Train Departs; Tōtsuki-ressha wa iku (遠月列車は行く)	November 4, 2016; 978-4-08-880806-2	December 5, 2017; 978-1-4215-9436-1
173. "Unfair" (不平等, "Fubyōdō"); 174. "The Salmon That Swims Through Time" (時をかける鮭, "Toki o kakeru sake"); 175. "The Tōtsuki Train Departs" (遠月列車は行, "Tōtsuki-ressha wa iku"); 176. "A Snow Day Prank" (雪の日の悪戯, "Yuki no hi no itazura"); 177. "The Rise of a Jeanne d'Arc" (立ち上がる女騎士(ジャンヌ・ダルク), "Tachiagaru Jannu Daruku"); 178. "The Shining City" (輝く街, "Kagayaku machi"); 179. "Confrontation" (対面, "Taimen"); 180. "Rematch" (リベンジ・マッチ, Ribenji Macchi); 181. "Becoming One With the Bear" (熊肉を攻略せよ, Kuma Niku o Kōryakuseyo); "Food Wars! Second Stomach! 6 and 7" (食戟のソーマ 別腹! (#6.#7), "Shoku No sōma betsubara! (#6.#7)")
22	Rematch With a Rival; Raibaru to no Saisen (ライバルとの再戦)	December 31, 2016; 978-4-08-880886-4	February 6, 2018; 978-1-4215-9704-1
182. "The Birth of the New Council" (新十傑の誕生, Shin Jukketsu no Tanjō); 183. "A New Approach" (新たな切り口, Arata na Kirikuchi); 184. "Debt of Gratitude" (恩義, Ongi); 185. "Rematch With a Rival" (ライバルとの再戦, Raibaru to no Saisen); 186. "Walking an Umami Tightrope" (うまみの綱渡り, Umami no Tsunawatari); 187. "Bursting Menchi Katsu" (爆ぜよメンチカツ, Haze yo Menchi Katsu); 188. "Round One" (第1ラウンド, Dai Ichi Raundo); 189. "Round Two" (第2ラウンド, Dai Ni Raundo); 190. "For the Sake of Another" (誰が為に, Ta ga Tame ni)
23	Wilderness Pioneer; Kōya o Hiraku Mono (荒野を拓く者)	March 3, 2017; 978-4-08-881020-1	April 3, 2018; 978-1-4215-9762-1
191. "Passionate Battle's End" (熱戦の果てに, Nessen no Hate ni); 192. "Wild" (乱舞, Ranbu); 193. "Declaration of War" (宣戦布告, Sensen Fukoku); 194. "The Price" (代償, Daishō); 195. "Wilderness Pioneer" (荒野を拓く者, Kōya o Hiraku Mono); 196. "Trailblazer" (先頭を征く者, Sentō o Yuku Mono); 197. "The Scarred One" (傷だらけの者, Kizu Darake no Mono); 198. "Exhaustion" (力尽きた者, Chikara Tsukita Mono); 199. "Soma's Strength" (創真の"強さ", Sōma no "Tsuyosa"); "Jump GIGA Special Project!!"
24	Welcome to the Final Battleground; Yōkoso Kessen no Chi e (ようこそ決戦の地へ)	May 2, 2017; 978-4-08-881072-0	June 5, 2018; 978-1-4215-9821-5
200. "Training Begins!" (特訓開始！, Tokkun Kaishi!); 201. "Takumi's Tenacity" (タクミの執念, Takumi no Shūnen); 202. "Erina's Training" (えりなの研鑽, Erina no Kensan); 203. "Reconfirmation" (再確認, Saikakunin); 204. "The Tenth Seat's Decision" (第十席の決意, Dai Jusseki no Ketsui); 205. "Creator of Happiness" (幸せの創造者, Shiawase no Sōzō-sha); 206. "Welcome to the Final Battleground" (ようこそ決戦の地へ, Yōkoso Kessen no Chi e); 207. "Bad Luck" (悪運, Akuun); 208. "Staying Grounded" (地に足つけて, Chi ni Ashi Tsukete)
25	The Life of a Reject; Ochikobore no Ikikata (落ちこぼれの生き方)	July 4, 2017; 978-4-08-881182-6	August 7, 2018; 978-1-4215-9949-6
209. "The Life of a Reject" (落ちこぼれの生き方, Ochikobore no Ikikata); 210. "The Unsavory Ties of East and West" (東西の腐れ縁, Tōzai no Kusareen); 211. "Absolutely Judges" (絶対的裁定者, Zettaiteki Saitei-sha); 212. "Visiting the Old Versus Learning the New" (温故 VS 知新, Onko VS Chishin); 213. "A Cup of Possibilities" (可能性の器, Kanōsei no Utsuwa); 214. "What Makes the Strong" (強さの起源, Tsuyosa no kigen); 215. "Thickness Is Justice" (肉厚は正義, Nikuatsu wa Seigi); 216. "Shouldering Polaris" (極星寮を背負って, Kyokuseiryō o Seotte); 217. "Results of the First Bout" (1st(ファースト) BOUT(バウト)を経て, 1st BOUT o Hete)
26	2nd Bout; 2nd BOUT (2nd(セカンド) BOUT(バウト))	September 4, 2017; 978-4-08-881204-5	October 2, 2018; 978-1-9747-0101-8
218. "Second Bout" (2nd(セカンド) BOUT(バウト), 2nd BOUT); 219. "Proving His Existence" (存在の証明, Sonzai no Shōmei); 220. "Rindo Takes the Stage" (竜胆、いざ参らん, Rindō, Iza Mairan); 221. "The Great Spice Battle" (辛味大合戦, Karami Daigassen); 222. "What We Want to Protect" (守りたいもの, Mamoritai Mono); 223. "Overcoming the Field" (フィールドを超えて, Fīrudo o Koete); 224. "Camera Flash" (ストロボ、輝く, Sutorobo, Kagayaku); 225. "Bushido Devotee" (貫く武士道, Tsuranuku Bushidō); 226. "When They All Assemble" (揃い踏む時, Soroibumu toki)
27	3rd BOUT; 3rd BOUT (3rd(サード) BOUT(バウト))	November 2, 2017; 978-4-08-881224-3	December 4, 2018; 978-1-9747-0146-9
227. "Results of the Second Bout" (2nd(セカンド) BOUT(バウト)の行方, 2nd BOUT no yukue); 228. "Hope in Solidarity" (希望の連帯, Kibō no rentai); 229. "The Third Bout" (3rd(サード) BOUT(バウト), 3rd BOUT); 230. "Aim for Victory! (勝利を狙え！, Shōri o nerae!); 231. "Full-Throttle Teamwork" (円陣全開！, Enjin zenkai!); 232. "All or Nothing" (乾坤一擲, Kenkonitteki); 233. "Proof of Growth" (成長の証明, Seichō no shōmei); 234. "You're Through!" (終わったぜ お前…!!, Owatta ze omae...!!); 235. "The Alchemist of Gourmet" (食の錬金術士, Shoku no renkinjutsu-shi)
28	First-Year Kid; Ichinen bōzu (一年坊主)	February 2, 2018; 978-4-08-881321-9	February 5, 2019; 978-1-9747-0254-1
236. "From the Beginning..." (最初から…, Saisho kara…); 237. "Doppio Mezzaluna Pizza" (双つの月が輝くピッツァ, Futatsu no tsuki ga kagayaku pittsua; "The Pizza of Two Glittering Moons"); 238. "The Queen's Tart" (女王さまのタルト, Joōsama no taruto); 239. "Her Fighting Style" (彼女のファイティングスタイル, Kanojo no faitingusutairu); 240. "Not Cute" (かわいくない, Kawaikunai); 241. "Warrior's Honor" (武士の誉れ, Bushi no homare); 242. "A Single Blade" (一本の刃, Ippon no yaiba); 243. "First-Year Kid" (一年坊主, Ichinen bōzu); 244. "The Fourth Bout" (4th(フォース) BOUT(バウト), 4nd BOUT)
29	Final Battle; Shūkyoku-sen (終局戦)	May 2, 2018; 978-4-08-881361-5	April 2, 2019; 978-1-9747-0510-8
245. "An Expert on Cute" ("可愛さ"のカリスマ, "Kawai-sa" no Karisuma; "The Charisma of Cuteness"); 246. "The Queen of Cute" (カワイイ"女王"様, Kawaī joō-sama); 247. "Ice Queen" (氷の女王, Kōri no joō); 248. "What the Average Feel" (凡人の気持ち, Bonjin no Kimochi); 249. "Watching from Beside You" (君の横顔, Kimi no Yokogao); 250. "The Man Named Eishi Tsukasa" (司瑛士という男, Tsukasa Eishi to Iu Otoko); 251. "Uninvited Guests" (招かれざる客, Manekarezaru Kyaku); 252. "Final Battle" (終局戦, Shūkyoku-sen); 253. "True Gourmet" (真の美食, Shin no Bishoku)
30	Their Approaches; Hissatsu no kōsu ryōri (必殺のコース料理)	July 4, 2018; 978-4-08-881411-7	June 4, 2019; 978-1-9747-0638-9
254. "Feasts and Famines" (饗宴と飢餓, "Kyōen to Kiga"); 255. "Lost In The Wilderness" (荒野に惑う者, "Kōya ni Madou Mono"); 256. "Armor of Dazzling White" (白き鎧の眩耀, "Shiroki Yoroi no Gen'yō"); 257. "How To Make Deadly Specialties" (必殺料理の作り方, "Hissatsu Ryōri no Tsukurikata"); 258. "The Knockout Specialty" (必殺の料理, Hissatsu no ryōri); 259. "Their Approaches" (二人の食戟, Futari no Shokugeki); 260. "Secret Main Course Technique" (必殺のコース料理, Hissatsu no kōsu ryōri); 261. "Rebel Angel" (反逆の天使, Hangyaku no Tenshi); 262. "Song of Hope" (希望の唄, Kibō no uta)
31	Tōtsuki Academy: Rebirth; Shinsei "Tōtsuki gakuen" (新生"遠月学園")	September 4, 2018; 978-4-08-881563-3	August 6, 2019; 978-1-9747-0774-4
Start of the arc "Hot Spring Investigation". (volumes 31-32/chapters 264-276/episode 73): 263. "Tootsuki Academy: Rebirth" (新生"遠月学園", Shinsei "Tōtsuki gakuen"); 264. "From: Tadokoro Megumi" (差出人：田所恵, Sashidashinin: Tadokoro Megumi); 265. "Soma & Megumi's Hot Spring Case Files, Part 1: The Darkness Lurking Behind The Steam" (創真と恵の湯けむり事件簿 其の1 ～湯気の向こうに潜む闇～, Sōma to Megumi no yukemuri jiken-bo sono 1 ~Yuge no mukō ni hisomu yami~); 266. "Soma & Megumi's Hot Spring Case Files, Part 2: The Shokugeki Scent Is In The Air" (創真と恵の湯けむり事件簿 其の2～立ち昇る食戟の香り～, Sōma to Megumi no yukemuri jiken-bo sono 2 ~Tachi noboru shokugeki no kaori~); 267. "Soma & Megumi's Hot Spring Case Files, Part 3: The Midnight Chefs" (創真と恵の湯けむり事件簿 其の3 ～真夜中の料理人～, Sōma to Megumi no yukemuri jiken-bo sono 3 ~Mayonaka no ryōrinin~); 268. "Soma & Megumi's Hot Spring Case Files, Part 4: Tootsuki Academy's Tenth Seat, Megumi Tadokoro" (創真と恵の湯けむり事件簿 其の4 ～遠月学園第十席 田所恵～, Sōma to Megumi no yukemuri jiken-bo sono 4 ~Tōtsuki gakuen dai jusseki Tadokoro Megumi~); 269. "Soma & Megumi's Hot Spring Case Files, Part 5: Megumi's Hospitality" (創真と恵の湯けむり事件簿 其の5 ~恵のホスピタリティ~, "Sōma to Megumi no Yukemuri Jiken-bo Sono 5 ~Megumi no Hosupitariti~"); 270. "The Real Culprit" (本当の犯人, Hontō no hannin); 271. Son of the Best of His Generation (世代最強の息子, "Sedai Saikyō no Musuko")
32	A Disturbing Visitor; Fuon'naru Raihō-sha (不穏なる来訪者)	December 4, 2018; 978-4-08-881645-6	October 1, 2019; 978-1-9747-0947-2
Start of the arc "Beach Exam". (volumes 32-33/chapters 277-282/episodes 74): 272. "A Disturbing Visitor" (不穏なる来訪者, "Fuon'naru Raihōsha"); 273. "My Other Son" (もう一人の息子, "Mō hitori no Musuko"); 274. "Sensei vs. First Seat" (先生 vs 第一席, "Sensei vs Dai Isseki"); 275. "Go for the Interesting Option" (そっちの方が面白れぇ, "Socchi no Hō ga Omoshirē"); 276. "War Breaks Out?! Love Battle" (勃発!? 恋愛バトル, "Boppatsu!? Ravu Batoru"); 277. "2nd Year End-of-Term Exams" (2年生学期末試験, "2-Nensei Gakki Matsu Shiken"); 278. "Wriggling in the Night" (夜はうごめいて, "Yoru wa Ugomeite"); 279. "Light the Beacon" (狼煙を上げろ, "Noroshi o Agero"); 280. "The Aroma of Comeback" (逆転の香気, "Gyakuten no Kōki"); 281. "The Blue" (THE(ザ) BLUE(ブルー), Za Burū)
33	Midnight Evolution; Mayonaka no Shinka (真夜中の真価)	February 4, 2019; 978-4-08-881719-4	December 3, 2019; 978-1-9747-0992-2
Start of the arc "BLUE". (volumes 33-36/chapters 283-315/episodes ): 282. "The Place Known as Yukihira" (ゆきひらという場所, "Yukihira to Iu Basho"); 283. "Predator and Prey" (狙う者、狙われる者, "Nerau Mono, Nerawareru Mono"); 284. "A Dying Chef" (死にゆく料理人, "Shini Yuku Ryōrinin"); 285. "A Last Supper" (最後の晩餐, "Saigo no Bansan"); 286. "A Chef's Price" (料理人の価値, "Shefu no Puraisui"); 287. "Conbini Wars" (コンビニの合戦, "Konbini no Kassen"); 288. "An Exceptional Set Menu" (破格の定食, "Hakaku no Teishoku"); 289. "I Want to be You" (俺はお前になりたい, "Ore wa Omae ni Naritai"); 290. "Midnight Evolution" (真夜中の真価, "Mayonaka no Shinka")
34	Cross Knives; Kurosu Naibuzu (交差する刃(クロスナイブズ))	April 4, 2019; 978-4-08-881796-5	February 4, 2020; 978-1-9747-1171-0
291. "Superhuman Chefs" (異能の料理人, "Inō no Ryōrinin"); 292. "The Haves, and the Have Nots" (持つ者と、持たざる者, "Motsu Mono to, Motazaru Mono"); 293. "Armed to the Teeth" (猛る兵装, "Takeru Āmudo"); 294. "Christmas in Midsummer" (真夏のクリスマス, "Manatsu no Kurisumasu"); 295. "Yukihira Souma's Superhuman Ability" (幸平創真の"異能", "Yukihira Sōma no "Inō""); 296. "Cross Knives" (交差する刃(クロスナイブズ), "Kurosu Naibuzu"); 297. "An Ecliptic Half-moon" (欠けた半月, "Kaketa Hangetsu"); 298. "For Those Two" (二人には, "Futari niwa"); 299. "Yin and Yang" (陰陽互根, "In'yō Gokon")
35	The God Tongue in Despair "Kami no Shita" no Zetsubō ("神の舌"の絶望)	June 4, 2019; 978-4-08-881841-2	April 7, 2020; 978-1-9747-1258-8
300. "Prayer Book" (呪願文, "Juganmon"); 301. "The Ice Witch" (氷の魔女, "Kōri no Majo"); 302. "Claws Serving Evil" (魔手爪牙, "Mashu Sōga"); 303. "The God Tongue in Despair" ("神の舌"の絶望, ""Kami no Shita" no Zetsubō"); 304. "The Curse of the God Tongue" ("神の舌"の呪い, ""Kami no Shita" no Noroi"); 305. "Surpass Your Father" (親父越え, "Oyaji Goe"); 306. "Two Birds, One Stone" (一箭双雕, "Issen Sōchō"); 307. "The Wizard's Magic" (魔術師の魔法, "Majutsushi no Mahō"); 308. "He Who Conquers" (従える者, "Shitagaeru Mono")
36	Shokugeki no Soma; Shokugeki no Sōma (食戟のソーマ)	October 4, 2019; 978-4-08-882073-6	June 2, 2020; 978-1-9747-1542-8
309. "The Heart Is..." (その心は, "Sono Kokoro wa"); 310. "The Fierce Battle of Flavor" (美味の激突, "Bimi no Gekitotsu"); 311. "The Taste of Failure" (失敗の味, "Shippai no Aji"); 312. "One's Own Taste" (自分自身の味, "Jibunjishin no Aji"); 313. "She who is having doubts about the "God tongue"" ("神の舌"に惑う者, ""Kami no Shita" ni Madou Mono"); 314. "The Finest Stones" (極上の石たち, "Gokujō no Ishitachi"); 315. "Shokugeki no Soma" (食戟のソーマ, "Shokugeki no Sōma"); 316. "Le Dessert - Chapter 1 - Le Présent" (デザート-章1-Le Présent, "Dezāto - shō 1 - Le Présent"); 317. "Le Dessert - Chapter 2 - Le Passé" (デザート-章2-Le Passé, "Dezāto - shō 2 - Le Passé"); 318. "Le Dessert - Chapter 3 - Le Futur" (デザート-章3-Le Futur, "Dezāto - shō 3 - Le Futur")

== See also ==
- List of Food Wars: Shokugeki no Soma episodes
- List of Food Wars: Shokugeki no Soma characters
