= Erina =

Erina may refer to:

- Erina (given name), a feminine Japanese given name
- Erina, New South Wales, a suburb in New South Wales, Australia
  - Erina Shire, a former local government area
  - Erina Eagles, an Australian rugby league club
- Erina, a junior synonym of Candalides, a genus of butterflies

== See also ==
- Rosa D'Erina (1848–1915), Irish opera singer
