= Erina (given name) =

- Gender: Female

Origin
- Origin: Japanese
- Meaning: Different meanings depending on the kanji used

Erina (written: 愛理奈, 恵里奈, 恵里菜, 恵利奈, 絵里奈, 絵梨奈, 絵理奈, 衣梨奈, 衣理那, 依里奈 or えり菜) is a feminine Japanese given name. Notable people with the name include:

- Erina Hayashi (林 恵里奈; born 1994), Japanese tennis player
- Erina Ikuta (生田 衣梨奈; born 1997), Japanese singer and idol
- Erina Kamiya (actress) (上矢えり奈; born 1991), Japanese model/actress
- Erina Kamiya (speed skater) (神谷 衣理那; born 1992), Japanese speed skater
- Erina Mano (真野 恵里菜; born 1991), Japanese singer, idol and actress
- Erina Masuda (枡田 絵理奈; born 1985), Japanese announcer
- Erina Matsui (松井 えり菜; born 1984), Japanese artist
- Erina Nakayama (actress, born 1987) (中山 恵里奈; born 1987), Japanese voice actress
- Erina Nakayama (actress, born 1995) (中山 絵梨奈; born 1995), Japanese actress
- Erina Takahashi, English ballerina
- Erina Yamaguchi (山口 絵里奈; born 1985), Japanese gravure idol
- Erina Yamane (山根 恵里奈; born 1990), Japanese women's footballer
- Erina Yamazaki (山崎 依里奈; born 1974), Japanese voice actress

== Fictional characters ==
- Erina Shindō (神堂 慧理那), character in the light novel series Gonna be the Twin-Tail!!
- Erina Nakiri (薙切 えりな), a character in the manga series Shokugeki no Sōma
- Erina Pendleton (エリナ・ペンドルトン・ジョースター), supporting character in parts 1 and 2 of the manga series JoJo's Bizarre Adventure
- Erina Kinjo Won, character in the anime series Martian Successor Nadesico
