= No Cards =

Farcical one-act opera by Thomas German Reed and W. S. Gilbert

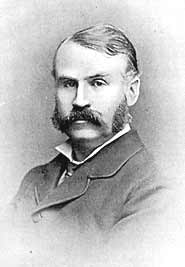
W.S. Gilbert in about 1870

No Cards is a "musical piece in one act" for four characters, written by W. S. Gilbert, with music composed and arranged by Thomas German Reed. It was first produced at the Royal Gallery of Illustration, Lower Regent Street, London, under the management of German Reed, opening on 29 March 1869 and closing on 21 November 1869. The work is a domestic farce of mistaken identities and inept disguises, as two men desperately compete to marry a wealthy young lady. One is young and poor, and the other is a rich miser. Each disguises himself as her guardian.

No Cards was the first of Gilbert's six pieces for the Gallery of Illustration. It was also Gilbert's first libretto with prose dialogue and the first stage work for which he wrote lyrics to be set to music, rather than lyrics to pre-existing music. No Cards was played on a double bill with Arthur Sullivan and F. C. Burnand's Cox and Box, although Gilbert and Sullivan did not meet until later that year. After a successful 139 performances in London, the bill toured the British provinces. Gilbert liked German Reed's setting of the Babbetyboobledore song enough to reuse it later in 1869 in his next show, The Pretty Druidess.

Music publisher Joseph Williams & Co. reissued "No Cards" in 1895 with a score by "Lionel Elliott", which appears to be a pseudonym. A production mounted at St. George's Hall in London in 1873 appears to have been the first to use this "Elliott" score, and a revival took place at St. George's Hall in 1902. The Royal Victorian Opera Company of Boston, Massachusetts made a video of the piece in 1996 using the Elliott score. The first British revival in over a century was produced by the Centenary Company at the Greenwich Theatre from 18 to 21 November 2009 (as a curtain raiser to The Pirates of Penzance) using Elliott's score retrieved from the British Library.

== Background ==
At the time that W. S. Gilbert began writing plays:

The stage was at a low ebb, Elizabethan glories and Georgian artificialities had alike faded into the past, stilted tragedy and vulgar farce were all the would-be playgoer had to choose from, and the theatre had become a place of evil repute to the righteous British householder.

Oratorio was then at the height of its vogue, and Shakespearean drama as interpreted by the Kean, Macready, and Kendal school still held its public; but at the other extreme there were only farces or the transplanted operettas of Offenbach, Lecocq and other French composers, which were as a rule very indifferently rendered, and their librettos so badly translated that any wit or point the dialogue might have possessed was entirely lost.

— Jessie Bond

To fill this gap, Thomas German Reed opened his German Reed Entertainments at the Gallery of Illustration. Seeing the quality of Gilbert's early burlesques, he engaged Gilbert to write a series of six one-act operettas. The Gallery of Illustration was a 500-seat theatre with a small stage that only allowed for four or five characters with accompaniment by a piano, harmonium and sometimes a harp.

Gilbert's libretto, his first with lyrics written to be set by a composer, instead of written to existing melodies, gives hints of some elements of his later works. For instance, the "uncivilised" island of Babbetyboobledore is an early look at a Gilbertian utopia, such as in the Gilbert and Sullivan opera Utopia, Limited, written 25 years later. Compare these lyrics from No Cards:

Civilization takes no stride....
There's nothing like self-respect or pride
In Babbletyboobledore.
"They've little regard for money or birth –
Unless it's allied to genuine worth"

with these from Utopia, Limited:

[We are] little better than half-clothed barbarians....
"The Brewers and the Cotton Lords no longer seek admission,
And literary merit meets with proper recognition."

There is also a verse on the subject of disguises, with reference to Paddington Pollaky, who was later mentioned in Patience. In addition, the libretto of No Cards, as in Gilbert's later works, includes topical references to subjects like siamese twins. It also includes the interpolated Bab Ballad "The Precocious Baby" and the interpolated music hall numbers "Champagne Charlie" and Gilbert's 1868 song "Thady O'Flynn".

In the presentation of Cox and Box that accompanied No Cards, Reed played Cox, Arthur Cecil played Box, and J. Seymour was Bouncer. The production marked the stage debut of Cecil.

== Roles and original cast ==
- Miss Annabella Penrose, An Heiress, Niece of Mrs. Pennythorne – Rosa D'Erina (soprano)
- Mrs. Pennythorne, A lady of considerable matrimonial experiences, with strong opinions and convictions on "Women's Rights." – Priscilla Horton German Reed (contralto)
- Mr. Ellis Dee, A wealthy old bachelor – Thomas German Reed (baritone)
- Mr. Churchmouse, A poor young bachelor – Arthur Cecil (tenor)
- A servant (silent)

== Synopsis ==
In her boudoir, Mrs. Pennythorne opines to her niece, Annabella Penrose, who has inherited 25,000 pounds from her aunt, Salamanca Trombone, that marriage is a very positive institution, despite her own marriage to a man who promptly ran off with all her money. Annabella doesn't fancy marrying the much older and infelicitous Mr. Dee, despite his wealth. The young Mr. Churchmouse, on the other hand, is painfully shy (as Robin Oakapple would be in Gilbert and Sullivan's Ruddigore almost two decades later), except when he is portraying a role on stage. But, in any case, she cannot marry until she can locate her guardian, Mrs. Pennythorne's rogue of a husband, Mr. Coodle, who hasn't been heard from for 20 years.

Mr. Dee arrives, soon followed by Mr. Churchmouse, who has a toothache. Dee and Churchmouse both undertake to find Mr. Coodle. Mrs. Pennythorne shows them a portrait. Dee goes off, and Churchmouse stays to converse rather nonsensically with Annabella and then leaves. Dee re-enters disguised as Coodle's best man at the wedding of so long ago, but has no calling card. Mrs. P is not fooled but plays along. The disguised Dee says that Coodle is on his way to confer the hand of his niece upon Mr. Dee. Then Churchmouse enters, disguised as Coodle, also with no card. His disguise is even worse than Dee's.

Dee reappears, still disguised. He is left alone with Churchmouse, and they each sound out the other, each suspecting that the other is a phony. Mrs. P reenters, now disguised as Salmanca Trombone, and says that she has been to the Indian archipelago, where the locals elected her the queen of Babbetyboobledore. She asks which of the two is Mr. Coodle. Dee speaks up, and Mrs. P immediately draws a revolver and declares, "I've come to shoot Coodle". Dee then says that Churchmouse is Coodle, but Churchmouse loses his disguise. She also says that Annabella does not have 25,000 pounds. Dee then says that he is too old for Annabella and loses his disguise. Churchmouse, however, says that she is not too poor for him. She hands Churchmouse a slip announcing his wedding to Annabella.

== Musical numbers ==
- No. 1. – Mrs. Pennythorne. "A great deal of experience in life I've had"
- Sometimes an interpolated song was added here for Miss Penrose: "Thady O'Flinn"
- No. 2. – Mr. Ellis Dee, Mr. Churchmouse, Miss Penrose. "From this pretty bower hence"
- No. 3. – Mr. Churchmouse. "An elderly person, a prophet by trade"
- No. 4. – Mrs. Pennythorne. "You ask me what species of people I met"
- No. 5. Finale – "Believe me, as far as with me it remains"
