= List of Food Wars! Shokugeki no Soma episodes =

Cover art of the first Blu-ray compilation, featuring main character Soma Yukihira

The Food Wars!: Shokugeki no Soma anime television series is produced by J.C.Staff and directed by Yoshitomo Yonetani, the series was first announced in October 2014 by Shueisha. The series was broadcast in Japan on TBS from April 4 to September 26, 2015, with additional broadcasts on MBS, CBC, BS-TBS, and Animax. The video streaming service Crunchyroll simulcast the series with English subtitles to the United States, Canada, Australia, New Zealand, South Africa, Latin America, Europe (excluding French speaking territories and Italian speaking territories), the Middle East, and North Africa. Sentai Filmworks licensed the series for digital and home video distribution in North America. A second season named Food Wars! Shokugeki no Soma The Second Plate aired from July 2 to September 24, 2016. The first cour of the third season, titled Food Wars! Shokugeki no Soma: The Third Plate, aired from October 4 to December 20, 2017. The second half aired from April 9 to June 25, 2018. A fourth season entitled Food Wars! Shokugeki no Soma: The Fourth Plate aired from October 12 to December 28, 2019. A fifth and final season entitled Food Wars! Shokugeki no Soma: The Fifth Plate aired from April 11 to September 26, 2020.

== Series overview ==
Season	Episodes		Originally released	
Season	Episodes		First released	Last released
1	24		April 4, 2015	September 26, 2015
2	13		July 2, 2016	September 24, 2016
3	24	12	October 4, 2017	December 20, 2017
3	24	12	April 9, 2018	June 25, 2018
4	12		October 12, 2019	December 28, 2019
5	13		April 11, 2020	September 26, 2020

== Episodes ==
=== Season 1 (2015) ===
No. overall	No. in season	Title (Note: English titles are taken from Sentai Filmworks.) (Note: English translated titles are taken from Crunchyroll.)	Directed by	Written by	Original release date	English air date
1	1	"The Vast Wasteland" / "An Endless Wasteland"; Transliteration: "Hatenaki Kōya" (Japanese: 果てなき荒野)	Sega Kajii	Shogo Yasukawa	April 4, 2015	July 7, 2019
2	2	"God Tongue"; Transliteration: "Kami no Shita" (Japanese: 神の舌)	Mitsutoshi Satou	Shogo Yasukawa	April 11, 2015	July 14, 2019
3	3	"That Chef Doesn't Smile" / "That Chef Never Smiles"; Transliteration: "Kono Ryōrinin wa Warawanai" (Japanese: この料理人は笑わない)	Toshiki Fukushima	Shogo Yasukawa	April 18, 2015	July 21, 2019
4	4	"Sacred Mother of Kyokusei" / "The Madonna of the Polar Star"; Transliteration: "Kyokusei no Maria" (Japanese: 極星の聖母 (マリア))	Kazuya Miura	Shogo Yasukawa	April 25, 2015	July 28, 2019
5	5	"The Ice Queen and the Spring Storm"; Transliteration: "Kōri no Joō to Haru no Arashi" (Japanese: 氷の女王と春の嵐)	Ryo Ando	Shogo Yasukawa	May 2, 2015	August 4, 2019
6	6	"The Meat Aggressor" / "The Meat Invader"; Transliteration: "Niku no Shinryakusha" (Japanese: 肉の侵略者)	Kenichiro Komaya	Shinichi Inozume	May 9, 2015	August 11, 2019
7	7	"The Silent Bowl, the Eloquent Bowl" / "A Quiet Don, an Eloquent Don"; Transliteration: "Shizukanaru Don, Yūben'na Don" (Japanese: 静かなる丼、雄弁な丼)	Sega Kajii	Shinichi Inozume	May 16, 2015	August 18, 2019
8	8	"A Concerto of Concept and Creation" / "The Concerto of Inspiration and Imagination"; Transliteration: "Hassō to Sōzō no Kyōsōkyoku" (Japanese: 発想と創造の協奏曲)	Hiroyuki Okuno	Shun Kawanabe	May 23, 2015	August 25, 2019
9	9	"The Breading That Showcases the Mountains" / "The Breading to Adorn the Mountains"; Transliteration: "Yama o Irodoru Koromo" (Japanese: 山を彩る衣)	Mitsutoshi Satou	Shun Kawanabe	May 30, 2015	September 1, 2019
10	10	"The Supreme Recette" / "The Heavenly Recette"; Transliteration: "Shijō no Rusetto" (Japanese: 至上のルセット)	Yasushi Murayama	Shun Kawanabe	June 6, 2015	September 8, 2019
11	11	"The Magician from the East"; Transliteration: "Higashi kara Kita Majutsushi" (Japanese: 東から来た魔術師)	Ryo Ando	Shogo Yasukawa	June 13, 2015	September 15, 2019
12	12	"The Memory of a Single Dish" / "The Memory of a Dish"; Transliteration: "Hito-sara no Kioku" (Japanese: ひと皿の記憶)	Hiroyuki Okuno	Shogo Yasukawa	June 20, 2015	September 22, 2019
13	13	"Eggs Before the Dawn"; Transliteration: "Yoake Mae no Tamago-tachi" (Japanese: 夜明け前の卵たち)	Sega Kajii	Shinichi Inozume	June 27, 2015	October 6, 2019
14	14	"Metamorphose" / "Metamorphosis"; Transliteration: "Metamorufōze" (Japanese: メタモルフォーゼ)	Hikaru Sato	Shinichi Inozume	July 4, 2015	October 13, 2019
15	15	"The Man Called 'Carnage'" / "The Man Called Demon"; Transliteration: "Syura to Yobareda Otoko" (Japanese: 『修羅』と呼ばれた男)	Makoto Noriza	Shun Kawanabe	July 18, 2015	October 20, 2019
16	16	"The Cook Who Traveled Thousands of Miles" / "The Chef Who's Crossed a Thousand Leagues"; Transliteration: "Banri o Kakeru Ryōrinin" (Japanese: 万里を駆ける料理人)	Takashi Yamazaki	Shun Kawanabe	July 25, 2015	October 27, 2019
17	17	"Sensual Fried Chicken" / "The Seductive Karaage"; Transliteration: "Kannō no Karaage" (Japanese: 官能の唐揚げ)	Junto Sasaki	Shogo Yasukawa	August 1, 2015	November 3, 2019
18	18	"The Fried Chicken of Youth" / "The Karaage of Youth"; Transliteration: "Seishun no Karaage" (Japanese: 青春の唐揚げ)	Hiroyuki Okuno	Shogo Yasukawa	August 8, 2015	November 10, 2019
19	19	"The Chosen One"; Transliteration: "Erabareshi Mono" (Japanese: 選ばれし者)	Sega Kajii	Shinichi Inozume	August 15, 2015	November 17, 2019
20	20	"Dragon Lies Prone then Ascends to the Sky" / "The Dragon Lies Down and Ascends the Skies"; Transliteration: "Ryū wa Fushi, Sora e Noboru" (Japanese: 龍は臥し、空へ昇る)	Makoto Noriza	Shogo Yasukawa	August 22, 2015	November 24, 2019
21	21	"That Which Is Known Yet Unknown" / "The Unknown Known"; Transliteration: "Michinaru Kichi" (Japanese: 未知なる既知)	Takashi Yamazaki	Shun Kawanabe	August 29, 2015	December 8, 2019
22	22	"That Which Transcends the Norm" / "The One Who Surpasses the Ordinary"; Transliteration: "Nichijō o Koerumono" (Japanese: 日常を超えるもの)	Mitsutoshi Satou	Shinichi Inozume	September 5, 2015	December 15, 2019
23	23	"The Unfolding Individual Competition" / "The Competition of the Blossoming Individuals"; Transliteration: "Hana Hiraku Ko no Kyōen" (Japanese: 花開く個の競演)	Ryo Ando	Shogo Yasukawa	September 12, 2015	January 5, 2020
24	24	"The Warriors' Banquet" / "The Banquet of Warriors"; Transliteration: "Senshi-tachi no Utage" (Japanese: 戦士たちの宴)	Tani Yoshitomo, Hikaru Sato	Shogo Yasukawa	September 26, 2015	January 12, 2020

=== Season 2: The Second Plate (2016) ===
No. overall	No. in season	Title	Directed by	Written by	Original release date	English air date
25	1	"That Which is Placed Within the Box" / "What Fills the Box"; Transliteration: "Sono Hako ni Tsumeru mono" (Japanese: その箱に詰めるもの)	Hikaru Sato	Shogo Yasukawa	July 2, 2016	January 19, 2020
26	2	"Interplay of Light & Shadow" / "The Interplay of Light and Shadow"; Transliteration: "Kōsakusuru Hikari to Kage" (Japanese: 交錯する光と影)	Kazuhiro Yoneda	Shogo Yasukawa	July 9, 2016	January 26, 2020
27	3	"The Age of Kings" / "The Generation of Prodigies"; Transliteration: "“Gyoku” no Sedai" (Japanese: 『玉』の世代)	Kazuya Miura	Shogo Yasukawa	July 16, 2016	February 2, 2020
28	4	"The Pursuer"; Transliteration: "Tsuiseki-sha" (Japanese: 追跡者)	Sayaka Morikawa	Shogo Yasukawa	July 23, 2016	February 9, 2020
29	5	"The Secret of the First Bite" / "The Secret in the First Bite"; Transliteration: "Hitokuchime no Himitsu" (Japanese: 一口目の秘密)	Mitsutoshi Satou	Shogo Yasukawa	July 30, 2016	February 16, 2020
30	6	"Morning Shall Come Again" / "Dawn Will Come Again"; Transliteration: "Asa wa Mata Kuru" (Japanese: 朝はまた来る)	Hiroyuki Okuno	Shogo Yasukawa	August 6, 2016	February 23, 2020
31	7	"Beasts That Devour Each Other" / "Beasts Devouring Each Other"; Transliteration: "Kuraiau Kemono" (Japanese: 喰らい合う獣)	Hiroshi Kawashima	Shogo Yasukawa	August 13, 2016	March 1, 2020
32	8	"The Battle That Follows the Seasons" / "Battle of Seasonality"; Transliteration: "Shun o Meguru Tatakai" (Japanese: 旬を巡る戦い)	Yoshitaka Fujimoto	Shun Kawanabe	August 20, 2016	March 8, 2020
33	9	"The Sword That Announces Fall" / "A Sword that Signals Autumn"; Transliteration: "Aki o Tsugeru Katana" (Japanese: 秋を告げる刀)	Chikara Sakurai	Shogo Yasukawa	August 27, 2016	March 15, 2020
34	10	"A New Jewel" / "A New Genius"; Transliteration: "Aratanaru "Gyoku"" (Japanese: 新たなる玉)	Hiroyuki Okuno	Shogo Yasukawa	September 3, 2016	March 22, 2020
35	11	"The Stagiaire"; Transliteration: "Sutajiēru" (Japanese: スタジエール)	Mitsutoshi Satou, Tani Yoshitomo	Shun Kawanabe	September 10, 2016	March 29, 2020
36	12	"The Magician Returns" / "The Magician Once More"; Transliteration: "Majutsu-shi Futatabi" (Japanese: 魔術師再び)	Sayaka Morikawa	Shogo Yasukawa	September 17, 2016	April 5, 2020
37	13	"Pomp & Circumstance" / "Pomp and Circumstance"; Transliteration: "Ifudōdō" (Japanese: 威風堂々)	Hiroyuki Okuno, Hikaru Sato	Shogo Yasukawa	September 24, 2016	April 19, 2020

=== Season 3: The Third Plate (2017–18) ===
No. overall	No. in season	Title	Directed by	Written by	Original release date	English air date
Part 1
38	1	"Challenging the Ten" / "Challenging the Elite Ten"; Transliteration: "Jukketsu ni Idomu" (Japanese: 十傑に挑む)	Mitsutoshi Satou	Shogo Yasukawa	October 4, 2017	February 28, 2021
39	2	"Má & Là" / "Má and Là"; Transliteration: "Mā to Rā" (Japanese: 『麻』と『辣』)	Takeshi Nishino	Shogo Yasukawa	October 11, 2017	March 7, 2021
40	3	"The Lunar Feast" / "Moon Festival"; Transliteration: "Gekkyōsai" (Japanese: 月饗祭)	Makoto Noriza	Shogo Yasukawa	October 18, 2017	March 14, 2021
41	4	"A Pride of Young Lions"; Transliteration: "Wakaki Shishi-tachi no Mure" (Japanese: 若き獅子たちの群れ)	Kazuya Miura	Shogo Yasukawa	October 25, 2017	March 21, 2021
42	5	"The Shadow over the Dining Table" / "The Darkening Dinner Table"; Transliteration: "Kageriyuku Shokutaku" (Japanese: 翳りゆく食卓)	Hiroyuki Okuno	Shogo Yasukawa	November 1, 2017	March 28, 2021
43	6	"The Captive Queen" / "The Imprisoned Queen"; Transliteration: "Toraware no Joō" (Japanese: 囚われの女王)	Makoto Noriza	Shogo Yasukawa	November 8, 2017	April 4, 2021
44	7	"The Academy Falls" / "It Begins"; Transliteration: "Hibuta wa Kirareta" (Japanese: 火蓋は切られた)	Sega Kajii	Shinichi Inozume	November 15, 2017	April 11, 2021
45	8	"The Alchemist"; Transliteration: "Arukimisuta" (Japanese: 錬金術師(アルキミスタ))	Shinpei Nagai, Ei Tanaka	Shinichi Inozume	November 22, 2017	April 18, 2021
46	9	"Hunting the Straggerlers" / "Hunting the Survivors"; Transliteration: "Zantōgari" (Japanese: 残党狩り)	Hiroyuki Okuno	Shogo Yasukawa	November 29, 2017	April 25, 2021
47	10	"Dance of the Salmon" / "The Salmon Will Dance"; Transliteration: "Sake wa Odoru" (Japanese: 鮭は踊る)	Makoto Noriza	Shinichi Inozume	December 6, 2017	May 2, 2021
48	11	"Der Weiße Ritter der Tafel" / "The White Knight of the Panel"; Transliteration: "Shokutaku no Shirokishi" (Japanese: 食卓の白騎士)	Kyohei Suzuki	Shogo Yasukawa	December 13, 2017	May 9, 2021
49	12	"Those Who Strive for the Top" / "The One Who Aims for the Summit"; Transliteration: "Itadaki wo Mezasu Mono" (Japanese: 頂を目指す者)	Sato Mitsutoshi, Ei Tanaka, Shinpei Nagai	Shogo Yasukawa	December 20, 2017	May 16, 2021
Part 2
50	13	"Advancement Exam"; Transliteration: "Shinkyū Shiken" (Japanese: 進級試験)	Mitsutoshi Satou	Shogo Yasukawa	April 9, 2018	May 23, 2021
51	14	"The Totsuki Train Heads Forth" / "Onward on the Totsuki Train"; Transliteration: "Tōtsuki-ressha wa Iku" (Japanese: 遠月列車は行)	Shinpei Nagai	Shogo Yasukawa	April 16, 2018	May 30, 2021
52	15	"Joan of Arc Arises" / "Jeanne d'Arc Rises"; Transliteration: "Tachiagaru Onna Kishi" (Japanese: 立ち上がる女騎士)	Toshiki Fukushima	Shogo Yasukawa	April 23, 2018	June 6, 2021
53	16	"Revenge Match"; Transliteration: "Ribenji Matchi" (Japanese: リベンジ・マッチ)	Shigeki Kurii	Shogo Yasukawa	April 30, 2018	June 13, 2021
54	17	"Walking the Tightrope of Umami" / "The Umami Tightrope"; Transliteration: "Umami no Tsunawatari" (Japanese: 旨味の綱渡り)	Sega Kajii	Shogo Yasukawa	May 7, 2018	June 20, 2021
55	18	"For Someone's Sake" / "For Whom"; Transliteration: "Dare ga Tame ni" (Japanese: 誰が為に)	Kyohei Suzuki	Shogo Yasukawa	May 14, 2018	June 27, 2021
56	19	"A Declaration of War" / "Declaration of War"; Transliteration: "Sensen Fukoku" (Japanese: 宣戦布告)	Ei Tanaka	Shogo Yasukawa	May 21, 2018	July 4, 2021
57	20	"Erina's Devotion" / "Erina's Diligent Studies"; Transliteration: "Erina no Kensan" (Japanese: えりなの研鑽)	Makoto Noriza	Shogo Yasukawa	May 28, 2018	July 11, 2021
58	21	"He Who Clears a Path Through the Wilderness" / "The Pioneer of the Wastelands"; Transliteration: "Kōya o Hiraku Mono" (Japanese: 荒野を拓く者)	Sega Kajii	Shogo Yasukawa	June 4, 2018	July 18, 2021
59	22	"To the Site of the Final Battle" / "To the Final Battleground"; Transliteration: "Kessen no Chi e" (Japanese: 決戦の地へ)	Shigeki Kurii	Shogo Yasukawa	June 11, 2018	July 25, 2021
60	23	"For the Sake of Kyokusei Dorm" / "Bearing Polar Star Dormitory"; Transliteration: "Kyokuseiryō o Seotte" (Japanese: 極星寮を背負って)	Toshiki Fukushima	Shogo Yasukawa	June 18, 2018	August 1, 2021
61	24	"That Which Makes One Strong" / "The Basis for Strength"; Transliteration: "Kyōshataru Yuen" (Japanese: 強者たる所以(ゆえん))	Ei Tanaka	Shogo Yasukawa	June 25, 2018	August 1, 2021

=== Season 4: The Fourth Plate (2019) ===
No. overall	No. in season	Title	Directed by	Storyboarded by	Original release date (Note: Tokyo MX lists the broadcast times as Friday nights at 24:30, meaning the first broadcast technically occurred on Saturday at 12:30 a.m. JST. Dates in this article reflect the actual calendar date of broadcast.)	English air date
62	1	"That Which I Want to Protect" / "What We Want to Protect"; Transliteration: "Mamoritai mono" (Japanese: 守りたいもの)	Youhei Suzuki	Yoshitomo Yonetani	October 12, 2019	August 22, 2021
63	2	"The Strobe Flashes" / "Camera Flash"; Transliteration: "Sutorobo kagayaku" (Japanese: ストロボ、輝く)	Ryo Ando	Yoshitomo Yonetani	October 19, 2019	August 29, 2021
64	3	"Hopeful Solidarity" / "Hope in Solidarity"; Transliteration: "Kibō no Rentai" (Japanese: 希望の連帯)	Shigeki Awai	Kouichi Takada	October 26, 2019	September 5, 2021
65	4	"Aim for Victory!"; Transliteration: "Shōri o nerae!" (Japanese: 勝利をねらえ！)	Ei Tanaka	Iku Suzuki	November 2, 2019	September 12, 2021
66	5	"You're Done For, Fool" / "You're Through"; Transliteration: "Owatta ze, omae" (Japanese: 終わったぜ、お前)	Yoshiyuki Nogami	Daigo Yamagishi	November 9, 2019	September 19, 2021
67	6	"A Single Blade"; Transliteration: "Ippon no Yaiba" (Japanese: 一本の刃)	Naoki Murata	Kouichi Takada	November 16, 2019	September 26, 2021
68	7	"Two Queens" / "The Two Queens"; Transliteration: "Futari no Joō" (Japanese: ふたりの女王)	Miyuki Ishida	Iku Suzuki	November 23, 2019	October 3, 2021
69	8	"Your Best Side" / "Watching from Beside You"; Transliteration: "Kimi no Yokogao" (Japanese: 君の横顔)	Ei Tanaka	Kouichi Takada	November 30, 2019	October 10, 2021
70	9	"The First & Second Seats" / "The First and Second Seats"; Transliteration: "Isseki to ni Seki" (Japanese: 一席と二席)	Seung Deok Kim	Kouichi Takada, Iku Suzuki	December 7, 2019	November 7, 2021
71	10	"How to Cook a Killer Dish" / "How to Build a Specialty"; Transliteration: "Hissatsu Ryōri no Tsukurikata" (Japanese: 必殺料理の作り方)	Kouzou Kaihou	Kouichi Takada, Iku Suzuki	December 14, 2019	November 14, 2021
72	11	"Song of Hope"; Transliteration: "Kibō no Uta" (Japanese: 希望の唄)	Makoto Sokuza	Miyana Okita	December 21, 2019	November 21, 2021
73	12	""The Totsuki Ten" Reborn" / "The New "Totsuki Elite Ten""; Transliteration: "Shinsei “Tōtsuki Jikketsu”" (Japanese: 新生『遠月十傑』)	Ei Tanaka	Yoshitomo Yonetani, Iku Suzuki	December 28, 2019	November 28, 2021

=== Season 5: The Fifth Plate (2020) ===
No. overall	No. in season	Title	Directed by	Storyboarded by	Original release date	English air date
74	1	"Final Exams"; Transliteration: "Gakkimatsu Shiken" (Japanese: 学期末試験)	Ei Tanaka	Kouichi Takada	April 11, 2020	March 19, 2023
75	2	"The BLUE Preliminaries"; Transliteration: "Ao no Zenshōsen" (Japanese: 青の前哨戦)	Makoto Sokuza	Yoshitomo Yonetani	April 18, 2020	March 26, 2023
76	3	"Noir"; Transliteration: "Nowāru" (Japanese: 真夜中の料理人(ノワール))	Iku Suzuki	Yoshitomo Yonetani	July 18, 2020	April 2, 2023
77	4	"The Last Supper"; Transliteration: "Saigo no Bansan" (Japanese: 最後の晩餐)	Nana Fujiwara	Iku Suzuki	July 25, 2020	April 9, 2023
78	5	"Convenience Store Brawl"; Transliteration: "Konbini Rantō" (Japanese: コンビニ乱闘)	Ryo Ando	Ryo Ando	August 1, 2020	April 16, 2023
79	6	"A Midsummer Christmas"; Transliteration: "Manatsu no Kurisumasu" (Japanese: 真夏のクリスマス)	Seung Deok Kim	Kouichi Takada	August 8, 2020	April 23, 2023
80	7	"Crossed Knives"; Transliteration: "Kurosu Naibuzu" (Japanese: 交差する刃(クロスナイブズ))	Ei Tanaka	Ei Tanaka	August 15, 2020	April 30, 2023
81	8	"The Missing Half of the Moon"; Transliteration: "Kaketa Hangetsu" (Japanese: 欠けた半月)	Makoto Sokuza	Miyana Okita	August 22, 2020	May 7, 2023
82	9	"The God Tongue's Despair"; Transliteration: "Kami no Shita no Zetsubō" (Japanese: 神の舌の絶望)	Yoshiyuki Nogami	Iku Suzuki	August 29, 2020	May 14, 2023
83	10	"Surpassing Dad"; Transliteration: "Oyaji Goe" (Japanese: 親父越え)	Nana Fujiwara	Iku Suzuki, Kouichi Takada	September 5, 2020	May 21, 2023
84	11	"The Taste of Failure"; Transliteration: "Shippai no Aji" (Japanese: 失敗の味)	Ryo Ando	Ryo Ando	September 12, 2020	June 4, 2023
85	12	"The Perfect Rocks"; Transliteration: "Gokujō no Ishitachi" (Japanese: 極上の石たち)	Ei Tanaka	Ei Tanaka	September 19, 2020	June 11, 2023 (Note: This episode aired at 1:15 a.m. EDT/PDT, 15 minutes after the original air time on Adult Swim.)
86	13	"Food Wars"; Transliteration: "Shokugeki no Sōma" (Japanese: 食戟のソーマ)	Hikaru Sato, Ei Tanaka	Yoshitomo Yonetani	September 26, 2020	June 18, 2023

== OVAs ==
No.	Title	Original release date
1	"Takumi's Downtown Battle"; Transliteration: "Takumi no Shitamachi Gassen" (Japanese: タクミの下町合戦)	May 2, 2016
This episode takes place sometime between the first and second seasons. The Aldini brothers head out for a trip to Tokyo Tower, where other students such as Alice, Ryo, and the boys from Polar Star Dormitory, with the exception of Sōma, are visiting too. Afterwards, they encountered a pretentious and disenchanted Urara working in a cosplay restaurant, before bumping into the girls from Polar Star Dormitory and have lunch together at a traditional Japanese restaurant. When Megumi requests cheese with her rice, an old man scoffs at the Aldini brothers for not respecting Japanese culture and he requests a food battle with Takumi who insists on dueling alongside his brother. The former's food, although nostalgic, is lacking in skill compared to the Aldini brothers', and he confesses that Takumi reminded him of his daughter's fiancé, a blonde-haired foreigner, whom he objected strictly against her marrying. After a long day, the brothers return home.
2	"Erina's Summer Vacation"; Transliteration: "Natsuyasumi no Erina" (Japanese: 夏休みのエリナ)	July 4, 2016
This episode takes place sometime before the second season, before the Autumn Elections Preliminaries. Erina is at a loss for what to do during summer vacation after finishing her schedule early for the day, so Alice takes her to a public pool. There, Alice enjoys watching Erina embarrass herself with wearing an old coat, a bathing suit in public, and admitting that she admires someone. Alice also attempts to educate Erina on the concept of love despite not knowing about it herself. In the end, Erina decides to focus on perfecting her cooking instead of understanding love. Meanwhile, the girls at Polar Star Dormitory are practically dying from the summer heat and stress for the Autumn Elections Preliminaries, and make a few failed attempts to cool down until the boys, including the Aldini brothers and Ikumi, arrive and take them to a cool stream where they eat shaved ice, and then barbeque. Likewise, Jun is prepared to pass out from heatstroke until Hayama generously makes her some cold porridge with soup.
3	"Autumn Moon's Chance Encounter"; Transliteration: "Shūgetsu no Meguriai" (Japanese: 秋月のめぐり逢い)	May 2, 2017
This episode takes place sometime after the second season after the first years completed their Stagiaire assignments. The Polar Star dorm residents, along with the Aldini brothers, Ikumi, Kurokiba, and Hayama take a trip to the hot springs inn where Megumi did her Stagiaire. Arriving at the Inn, Megumi and Isshiki showcased their table tennis finesse. With all of the Inn's cooks suffering accidents, the Polar Star gang and the others took over the kitchen for the arriving guests: Erina, Alice, and Hisako; who are impressed by the finely crafted meal supposedly made by amateurs, not knowing it is made by Tōtsuki students. Yukihira, intrigued by the legendary fish dubbed the 'River Master' in the nearby river, invite Kurokiba and Hayama to a fishing match, only to be dragged along in the water and coming back empty-handed; leaving behind a disgruntled Takumi who tries hopelessly to catch up to them. Later at night, Megumi inadvertently met Erina in the hot springs bath, realizing that the meal that she and the others cooked is for Erina.
4	"Tōtsuki Elite Ten"; Transliteration: "Tōtsuki Jukketsu" (Japanese: 遠月十傑)	July 4, 2017
This episode takes place after the Stagiaire event and just before the start of the third season. The Autumn Election quarter-finalists meet the Elite Ten Council at the annual Autumn Leaves Viewing event, excluding Erina, who sits with her fellow freshmen. With the exception of Megumi, the antagonism between the first years are apparent, until the Elite Ten shows up; displaying a much more tense resentment towards each other. Immediately, Soma extends a Shokugeki challenge to all of them, but they simply laugh it off, all except the Eight Seat, Kuga Terunori, who jokingly asks Soma to try and show some skill that outshines him cooking-wise for him to accept a challenge. The Fourth Seat, Akanegakubo Momo, made them all a sweet treat for the meeting, which gave the freshmen a glimpse of how far ahead the Elite Ten chefs are. Nonetheless, taking this experience to heart, they became much more persevered, and Soma looks for and awaits the opportunity for Kuga to live up to his word.
5	"Erina at Polar Star Dormitory"; Transliteration: "Kyokuseiryō no Erina" (Japanese: 極星寮のえりな)	May 2, 2018
Bundled with the 29th volume of the Shokugeki no Soma manga. It tells the story of what happened to Erina after she ran away from her father to the Polar Star Dormitory.

== Theme songs ==
Opening theme

Title	Lyrics	Composition	Arranger	Artist	Episodes
"Kibō no Uta" (希望の唄, The Song of Hope)	Wataru Terauchi	Kengo Ōhama	—	Ultra Tower	1–14, 24, OVA 1
"Rising Rainbow" (ライジングレインボウ)	Misokkasu	Misokkasu	—	Misokkasu	15–24, OVA 2
Rough Diamonds	Matsui Youhei	Oota Masatomo	Oota Masatomo	Screen mode	25–37, OVA 3–OVA 4
Braver	Zaq	Zaq	—	Zaq	38–49, OVA 5
Symbol (シンボル)	PON	—	Luck Life	Luck Life	50–61
Chronos	—	—	—	Stereo Dive Foundation	62–73
Last Chapter	—	—	—	Nano Ripe	74–86

Ending themes

Title	Lyrics	Composition	Arranger	Artist	Episodes
"Spice" (スパイス)	Ichirō	Tokyo Karan Koron	Tokyo Karan Koron	Tokyo Karankoron	1–14, 24, OVA 1
"Satchan's Sexy Curry" (さっちゃんのセクシーカレー, Satchan no Sekushī Karē)	Seiko Ōmori	Seiko Ōmori	—	Seiko Ōmori	15–23, OVA 2
"Snowdrop" (スノードロップ)	Kimiko	Jun Sasaki	Nano Ripe and Masayuki Fukutomi	Nano Ripe	26–37, OVA 3–OVA 4
"Kyokyo Jitsujitsu" (虚虚実実)	Kimiko	Jun Sasaki	Nano Ripe	Nano Ripe	38–49, OVA 5
Atria (アトりア)	Takao	鳴風	—	Fo'xTails	50–61
Emblem	—	—	—	Nano Ripe	62–73
Crossing Road	—	—	—	Mai Fuchigami	74–86
