= Erina Yamaguchi =

Japanese big-breasted glamour model (born 1985)

- Born: Erina Yamaguchi; October 19, 1985 (age 41); Fukuoka Prefecture, Japan
- Occupation: Gravure model
- Height: 1.65 m (5 ft 5 in)

Erina Yamaguchi (山口 絵里奈, Yamaguchi Erina; born October 19, 1985) is a Japanese big-breasted glamour model (kyonyū gravure idol).

== Biography ==
Erina was born October 19, 1985, in Fukuoka Prefecture, Kyūshū island. In 2004, she graduated from Fukuoka Jo Gakuin Junior & Senior High School (福岡女学院中学校・高等学校) in Minami-ku, Fukuoka City, which was known for having adopted sailor fuku for the first time.

After graduation, she worked as a hair model in Fukuoka, and was discovered by a modeling agency. She began her modeling career by posing for Weekly Playboy magazine issued June 19, 2006. She has so far released one photobook (photographed in Thailand by Yasuhiko Kani) and two DVDs. She also appeared non-nude pictorials in various adult magazines.

Erina currently studies painting in art school.
