= Rosa D'Erina =

Irish opera singer (1848–1915)

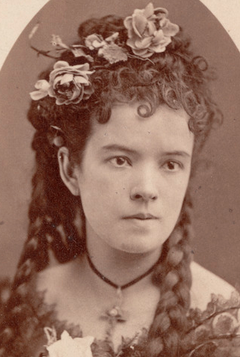
- Rosa D'Erina, from a cabinet card made in Canada, about 1875.
- Born: Rose Anna O'Toole; 22 February 1848; Armagh
- Died: 13 April 1915 (aged 67); Ontario
- Other names: Rosa D. Vontom (after marriage in 1884)
- Occupation(s): Singer, pianist, organist

Rosa D'Erina (22 February 1848– 13 April 1915), born Rose Anna O'Toole and known as the "Irish prima donna", was an Irish soprano, pianist and organist. She was the "vocalist by command to the Prince and Princess of Wales and the Irish court."

== Early life ==
Rose Anna O'Toole was from Armagh. At a young age she was organist in St Patrick’s Cathedral, Armagh, and trained as a singer in Paris with M. Duprez.

== Career ==
D'Erina performed as lead female in 1869 debut of W. S. Gilbert's No Cards, first produced at the Royal Gallery of Illustration in London, under the management of Thomas and Priscilla German Reed, opening on 29 March 1869 and closing on 21 November 1869.

D'Erina emigrated to North America in 1870. She was popular in Ottawa, giving several performances in that city between 1872 and 1876. She toured in Europe in 1874. In 1880, she encountered legal problems with a fraudulent booker in Iowa.

In 1889, she and her husband sang in Ireland, and toured Australia. D'Erina toured in the United States, including to the remote Ray, North Dakota, Opera House, and to Syracuse, New York, in 1892. She performed on organ and sang in Winnipeg in 1905, and in Minneapolis in 1908.

In 1873, Scottish poet Alexander Hamilton Wingfield wrote "Tribute to Rose D'Erina" and "Impromptu Apostrophe to Rose D'Erina", short poems which begin, respectively, "Welcome, Erin's Prima Donna, Greet her with a happy throng" and "Hail to thee, matchless Queen of Song."

== Personal life ==
In 1884, D'Erina married a New York City professor from a prominent French family, G. R. Vontom (1852–1928), Vicomte de Ste Croix, at the Church of the Holy Innocents in New York City, where she was employed as the organist. George Vontom had been born on isle of Jersey. The couple had a summer home in Ontario, where they helped to found the St. Boniface Catholic Church. She died in 1915, aged 67 years, and her grave is on St. Joseph Island in Ontario.
