= List of Food Wars!: Shokugeki no Soma characters =

The manga series Food Wars!: Shokugeki no Soma was created by Yuto Tsukuda and illustrated by Shun Saeki. The series follows the cooking journey of the protagonist, Soma Yukihira, a transfer student at the fictional Totsuki Saryo Culinary Institute. Totsuki Institute is an extremely competitive culinary school. (Note: While the English manga volume 1 back cover indicates the school has a 10% graduation rate, it appears to be about 1%, as Dean Senzaemon says in his opening speech that in the last year, of 812 entering freshman, only 76 made it to the second year, and that the number of students who graduate each year can be counted on one hand.) Students are judged on their cooking in events such as shokugeki (food war), a cooking duel.

== Development ==
When asked at Anime Expo about the diversity of characters, series creator Yuto Tsukuda said, "That was very important to me. I wanted the younger readers experiencing this manga to learn about different types of food and culture from different countries. I thought it would be great if kids reading the manga could grow up, travel the world, see unique dishes and remember, 'I saw that in Food Wars! when I was a kid.'"

The concept of the clothes falling off originated from "the idea of a girl eating food, and she expresses herself about the food with 'ecstasy'", but Tsukuda also realized early on that it meant they could also portray the male characters with clothes removed.

At Crunchyroll Expo 2019, Tsukuda said that he originally wanted to end the series soon after the central arc, since it had shown the growth of the key characters, citing "Soma's mental growth, Megumi's achievement of independence and Erina's development." However, he had doubts with have to resolve the relationship between Soma and Erina, so he rewrote the epilogue chapter for that several times before settling with the final.

== Main characters ==
=== Soma Yukihira ===
Voiced by: Yoshitsugu Matsuoka (Japanese); Blake Shepard (English)

Soma Yukihira (幸平 創真, Yukihira Sōma) is a 15-year-old chef who has been working at the family Joichiro's diner, Yukihira Family Restaurant, since he was a young child. When his father closes the diner to work overseas, Soma enrolls in the Totsuki Saryo Culinary Institute.

=== Erina Nakiri ===
Voiced by: Risa Taneda (2015–2016), Hisako Kanemoto (2017–2020) (Japanese); Stephanie Wittels (English)

Erina Nakiri (薙切 えりな, Nakiri Erina) is a first-year student at Totsuki and the granddaughter of the school's director Senzaemon. She was the valedictorian of Totsuki's junior high and is the youngest student to join the school's Council of Ten Masters. She was abused by her father Azami as a child when he was molding her Divine Tongue.^{Vol. 17}

=== Megumi Tadokoro ===
Voiced by: Minami Takahashi (Japanese); Jad Saxton (English)

Megumi Tadokoro (田所 恵, Tadokoro Megumi) is Soma's best friend and classmate at Totsuki and next-door dormmate at Polaris. Her shyness and stage fright causes her to perform poorly. Tsukuda said that "Megumi Tadokoro is probably from some area in Tohoku Prefecture and has a slight Tohoku dialect, but I purposefully obscured it. This is because I don't necessarily want her to be seen as a stereotype. I actually got a comment from someone living in Tohoku who mentioned that her Aomori dialect is not right."

== Supporting characters ==
=== Polar Star Dormitory ===
Polar Star Dormitory is a student residence within Totsuki, intended to house less affluent students. In order to become a resident, students must first cook a dish to the satisfaction of the dormitory manager Fumio.^{Ch. 6}

==== Fumio Daimido ====
Voiced by: Mari Yokō, Hitomi Nabatame (young) (Japanese); Joanne Bonasso (English)

Fumio Daimidō (大御堂 ふみ:緒, Daimidō Fumio), who goes by Miss Fumio, is the caretaker and dorm matron of Polaris. As the "Maria of Polaris", she administers a cooking test that students must pass to become residents.

==== Satoshi Isshiki ====
Voiced by: Takahiro Sakurai (Japanese); Scott Gibbs (English)

Satoshi Isshiki (一色 慧, Isshiki Satoshi) is a second-year student who occupies the seventh seat of the Council of Ten.^{Ch. 7} He has a few quirks, often appearing half-naked, wearing nothing but an apron and sometimes a fundoshi.^{Ch. 7}.

==== Yuki Yoshino ====
Voiced by: Maaya Uchida (Japanese); Luci Christian (English)

Yūki Yoshino (吉野 悠姫, Yoshino Yūki) is an energetic girl and a first-year resident in room 116.^{Ch. 7} Her specialty is cooking wild game.

==== Shun Ibusaki ====
Voiced by: Taishi Murata (Japanese); Houston Hayes (English)

Shun Ibusaki (伊武崎 峻, Ibusaki Shun) is a first-year resident whose specialty is smoked food,^{Ch. 7}.

==== Zenji Marui ====
Voiced by: Yūsuke Kobayashi (Japanese); Greg Ayres (English)

Zenji Marui (丸井 善二, Marui Zenji) is a first-year student. Quiet and studious, he is the star pupil of Professor Takao Miyazato's Seminar. His peers in the club call him "The Professor of Taste".

==== Ryoko Sakaki ====
Voiced by: Ai Kayano (Japanese); Kelley Peters (English)

Ryoko Sakaki (榊 涼子, Sakaki Ryōko) is a first-year student. Her specialty is shio koji (rice malt). She has a warehouse near the dorm where she does fermentation processing.^{Ch. 14} She also provides "fermented rice drink" at dork celebrations which Soma suspects is illegally brewed sake.^{Ch. 7}

==== Daigo Aoki and Shoji Sato ====
Voiced by: Junichi Yanagita (Japanese); Andrew Love (English) (Daigo)
Voiced by: Kengo Kawanishi (Japanese); Corey Hartzog (English) (Shōji)

Daigo Aoki (青木 大吾, Aoki Daigo) and Shōji Satō (佐藤 昭二, Satō Shōji) are two muscular dorm mates who tend to fight over everything, but are united when it comes to defending the honor of the dormitory and its members. They have a background role in the story.^{Ch. 50}

=== Totsuki 92nd Generation students ===
The following students enrolled in Totsuki at the same year as Soma.

==== Hisako Arato ====
Voiced by: Saori Ōnishi (Japanese); Brittney Karbowski (English)

Hisako Arato (新戸 緋沙子, Arato Hisako) is Erika's aide. She retained her position in her second year of junior high by defeating rival student Nao Sadatsuka in a shokugeki.^{Ch. 52} Inspired by her family, she specializes in medicinal cooking, which is based on natural remedies and Chinese medicine to improve health.

==== Ikumi Mito ====
Voiced by: Shizuka Ishigami (Japanese); Rachel Landon (English)

Ikumi Mito (水戸 郁魅, Mito Ikumi) is a first-year student. Known as the "Master of Meat", she is among the top students of her year, with her meat-based dishes always scoring A's. She strongly dislikes the nickname "Nikumi", a portmanteau of the Japanese word for "meat" and her given name.^{Ch. 10} She is the heiress to a large meat distributor and conglomerate.

==== Takumi Aldini ====
Voiced by: Natsuki Hanae (Japanese); Bryson Baugus (English)

Takumi Aldini (タクミ・アルディーニ, Takumi Arudīni) is a transfer student from Florence, Italy; His mother is Italian and his father Japanese.^{Ch. 17} He initiates a rivalry with Soma, viewing him as someone similar to himself. His twin brother is Isami. Takumi's specialty is Italian cuisine.

==== Isami Aldini ====
Voiced by: Yūki Ono (Japanese); Clint Bickham (English)

Isami Aldini (イサミ・アルディーニ, Isami Arudīni) is Takumi's younger twin brother. The spin-off manga Shokugeki no Soma – Fratelli Aldini focuses on the brothers' time in Italy. He and Takumi transfer to Totsuki's junior high program in their second year.^{Ch. 16-17}

==== Alice Nakiri ====
Voiced by: Chinatsu Akasaki (Japanese); Christina Kelly (English)

Alice Nakiri (薙切 アリス, Nakiri Arisu) is Erina Nakiri's cousin, introduced in the first-year cooking camp.^{Ch. 28, 33} Her mother is Danish and her father is Japanese. She specializes in molecular gastronomy, a scientific approach to cooking.

==== Ryo Kurokiba ====
Voiced by: Nobuhiko Okamoto (Japanese); Leraldo Anzaldua (English)

Ryo Kurokiba (黒木場 リョウ, Kurokiba Ryō) is Alice's aide. He is the former head chef of a pub on the coast of Denmark.^{Ch. 69} He considers the kitchen to be a battlefield.^{Ch. 68-69} Ryo's specialty is seafood dishes.

==== Nao Sadatsuka ====
Voiced by: Saori Gotō (Japanese); Karlii Hoch (English)

Nao Sadatsuka (貞塚 ナオ, Sadatsuka Nao) is a girl with long dark hair covering her face who is obsessed with Erina.^{Ch. 40} She despises Hisako,^{Ch. 40} after losing a shokugeki to her in junior high over who gets to be Erina's aide. She is then required to stay at least 50 meters from Erina at all times, but Nao still stalks Erina from afar and writes her 30 letters per day.^{Ch. 52} She is known as the Cauldron Witch, and specializes in dishes that involve boiling and simmering with ingredients that generate hideous smells.

==== Miyoko Hojo ====
Voiced by: Asami Seto (Japanese); Kara Greenberg (English)

Miyoko Hojo (北条 美代子, Hōjō Miyoko)^{Ch. 40} is the heir of a Chinese cuisine restaurant in Yokohama's Chinatown, Her specialty is Chinese techniques and wok maneuvers. Because she was looked down upon by the cooks at her father's restaurant because of her sex, she has a low opinion of men in general.

==== Akira Hayama ====
Voiced by: Junichi Suwabe (Japanese); Kregg Dailey (English)

Akira Hayama (葉山 アキラ, Hayama Akira) is a first-year student and the assistant for Professor Jun Shiomi. He looks after Shiomi. ^{Ch. 45} Akira specializes in curry dishes, with a wide knowledge of spices and aromas. He can detect different kinds of spices by smell alone.^{Ch. 45, 90}

==== Subaru Mimasaka ====
Voiced by: Hiroki Yasumoto (Japanese); Rob Mungle (English)

The chef who secures the fourth spot in his block at the Fall Classic preliminaries, Subaru Mimasaka (美作 昴, Mimasaka Subaru) is a heavily built student with hair styled in a braided mohawk.^{Ch. 59, 73} He provokes his opponents into shokugeki challenges in which they stake their best cooking knife and soundly defeats them.^{Ch. 76-77} He has no specialty, but it is soon revealed that he painstakingly stalks his opponents, learning the dishes they plan to make, and then makes the identical dish with improvements.^{Ch. 73, 77}

=== Other Totsuki students ===
==== Kanichi Konishi ====
Voiced by: Shinji Kawada (Japanese); Gareth West (English)

Kanichi Konishi (小西 寛一, Konishi Kan'ichi) is the second-year student and president of the Donburi Bowl Research Society. He has a pompadour hair style.

==== Urara Kawashima ====
Voiced by: Rina Hidaka (Japanese); Jennifer Gilbert (English)

Urara Kawashima (川島 麗, Kawashima Urara) is the master of ceremonies for the shokugeki competitions and other events at Totsuki.^{Ch. 12, 40} She greatly enjoys the attention she gets from her male fans and audience, and greatly dislikes it when other women take this attention from her.^{Ch. 12, 49, 56}

==== Yua Sasaki ====
Voiced by: Rina Hidaka (Japanese); Margaret McDonald (English)

Yua Sasaki (佐々木 由愛, Sasaki Yua) is the other Master of Ceremonies at the Fall Classic during the preliminary round when the event is split into two blocks.^{Ch. 53-55}

==== Mitsuru Sotsuda ====
Voiced by: Daiki Yamashita (Japanese); Patrick Poole (English)

Mitsuru Sotsuda (早津田 みつる, Sōtsuda Mitsuru) is a third-year student at Totsuki Junior High and a member of the Journalism Club. He worships Soma and follows him with his reporter equipment.^{Ch. 81}

==== Tetsuji Kabutoyama ====
Voiced by: Masashi Nogawa (Japanese); Jovan Jackson (English)

Tetsuji Kabutoyama (甲山 鉄次, Kabutoyama Tetsuji) is a second-year student known as "The Iron Skewer" for his skewer-cooking techniques. He has a shokugeki winning rate of 80%. He takes an interest in Soma after seeing his cooking during the Fall Classics, and is the first student to challenge Soma to a shokugeki after the latter was done with his stagiaire.

=== Tōtsuki staff ===
==== Senzaemon Nakiri ====
Voiced by: Banjō Ginga (Japanese); John Swasey (English)

Senzaemon Nakiri (薙切 仙左衛門, Nakiri Senzaemon) is Erina's grandfather, the patriarch of the Nakiri family, and the Dean of Tōtsuki Saryo Culinary Institute. He is known as the "Gastric Godfather" in the culinary world.^{Ch. 4} He has the tendency of stripping his upper body clothing when he eats a good dish.^{Ch. 66}

==== Roland Chapelle ====
Voiced by: Yū Mizushima (Japanese); John Gremillion (English)

Roland Chapelle is a French chef and lecturer at Totsuki, head of its French Cuisine Division. He is nicknamed "The Chef Who Doesn't Smile" due to his high standards and stern demeanor. ^{Ch. 4}

==== Jun Shiomi ====
Voiced by: Mikako Takahashi (Japanese); Monica Rial (English)

Jun Shiomi (汐見 潤, Shiomi Jun), age 34, is a professor at Totsuki who teaches second-year general classes and a seminar specializing in spices. An alumna of the 73rd graduating class and a former resident of Polaris during the dorm's golden age, she taste-tested many of Joichiro's cooking experiments, which left her traumatized enough to hate anything to do with him. Her petite stature and style makes her appear like a junior high school student.^{Ch. 44-45} She grows spices from all over the world in her lab.^{Ch. 45} She is a very timid and reserved person,^{Ch. 44-45, 95} and klutzy.^{Ch. 103} While researching spices overseas at age 26, Jun meets Akira Hayama and, recognizing his talent, brings him to Japan to mentor and take care of him.^{Ch. 57, 104}

==== Takao Miyazato ====
Voiced by: Ryuichi Kijima (Japanese); Justin Doran (English)

Takao Miyazato (宮里 隆夫, Miyazato Takao) is the president of the Shokugeki Administration Bureau. He runs a seminar that focuses on the academic knowledge of culinary and gastronomical topics. Zenji Marui attends as a first-year and is one of his top students.^{Ch. 55}

=== Totsuki alumni ===
==== Jōichirō Yukihira ====
Voiced by: Rikiya Koyama (Japanese); Jay Hickman (English)

Jōichirō Yukihira (幸平 城一郎, Yukihira Jōichirō), born Jōichirō Saiba (才波 城一郎, Saiba Jōichirō), is Soma's father and owner of Yukihira Family Restaurant.^{Ch. 1} in the Sumire Shopping District. He teaches Soma the family business and challenges him to many cook-offs that have always ended in Jōichirō's victory. (Note: At the start of the series, Joichiro has beaten Soma 489 times in cook-offs. ^{Ch. 1, Vol. 6})

==== Gin Dojima ====
Voiced by: Takehito Koyasu (Japanese); Ty Mahany (English)

Gin Dōjima (堂島 銀, Dōjima Gin) is the head chef and company director of the Totsuki Resorts, first appearing in the camp event for the first-year students. A graduate of Totsuki's 69th class,^{Ch. 84} he holds the record of the highest marks in the entire school, and has turned down offers to work for over 800 restaurants.^{Ch. 15}

Tsukuda said that he originally intended only for Gin Dojima to transform Sailor Moon magical girl style in the magical cabbage story.

==== Kojiro Shinomiya ====
Voiced by: Yuichi Nakamura (Japanese); Benjamin McLaughlin (English)

Kojiro Shinomiya (四宮 小次郎, Shinomiya Kojirō) is the owner of a French haute cuisine restaurant called Shino's.^{Ch. 15} After graduating at the top of the 79th class, he moves to Paris, earning the moniker "Le magicien de légume" (The Vegetable Magician) for emphasizing vegetables and having a Japanese approach to a cuisine that has been mostly meat dishes.

==== Hinako Inui ====
Voiced by: Mamiko Noto (Japanese); Allison Sumrall (English)

Hinako Inui (乾 日向子, Inui Hinako), of the 80th graduating class, heads the Japanese-cuisine restaurant Kiri No Ya.^{Ch. 15, 84} She is a bit absent-minded. She takes a liking towards Megumi Tadokoro. She is also fond of teasing Kojiro Shinomiya, which often results in the latter comically punishing her.^{Ch. 21-26}

==== Fuyumi Mizuhara ====
Voiced by: Ayako Kawasumi (Japanese); Chaney Moore (English)

Fuyumi Mizuhara (水原 冬美, Mizuhara Fuyumi), of the 79th graduating class and second seat on the Council, is the owner of the Italian restaurant Ristorante F.^{Ch. 84} She is often irritated with Shinomiya, but respects him as a chef. She is often deadpan, and serious compared to her light-hearted schoolmate Hinako Inui. She tried but failed to recruit the Aldini brothers and Soma for her restaurant at the conclusion of the first-year's summer camp.

==== Taki Tsunozaki ====
Voiced by: Mikako Komatsu (Japanese); Kira Vincent-Davis (English)

Taki Tsunozaki (角崎 瀧, Tsunozaki Taki), an 88th-generation graduate who held the second seat in the Council, she owns the Spanish restaurant Taki Amarillo which she opened a year after graduating. She first appears as a judge in the Fall Classic semifinals.^{Ch. 84-85}

==== Sonoka Kikuchi ====
Voiced by: Asuka Nishi (Japanese); Molly Searcy (English)

Sonoka Kikuchi (木久知 園果, Kikuchi Sonoka), a graduate of the 89th class and the second seat on the Council, owns a Western cuisine restaurant Shunkatei in which she opened within a year after graduating. She first appeared in the Fall Classic semifinals.^{Ch. 84-85}

=== Council of Ten Masters ===
The Totsuki Council of Ten Masters is the student council consisting of the top ten students of the school. They are in charge of decision-making regarding most issues at Totsuki. They report directly to the dean. The teachers must comply with their decisions.^{Ch. 7} Members of the council are given freedom to pursue personal projects.^{Ch. 119} The ten members are ranked by shokugeki success. ^{Ch. 119} The majority of council members are second and third-year students.

==== Etsuya Eizan ====
Voiced by: Tomokazu Sugita (Japanese); Anthony Hunter (English)

Etsuya Eizan (叡山 枝津也, Eizan Etsuya) is introduced as a second-year student who occupies the ninth seat on the Council.^{Ch. 39} He has been a culinary consultant for a number of businesses since junior high. His nickname is "The Alchemist".^{Ch. 39} Satoshi Isshiki perceives Eizan as a delinquent who had organized his own gang in junior high, and a yakuza mastermind.^{Ch. 40}

==== Eishi Tsukasa ====
Voiced by: Akira Ishida (Japanese); Nathan Wilson (English)

Eishi Tsukasa (司 瑛士, Tsukasa Eishi) is a third-year student who is the first seat of the Council.^{Ch. 119} Despite his talents and position, he suffers from stage fright.^{Ch. 119} He specializes in European gourmet cuisine, and due to his all-white color scheme, he is known in the culinary world as Der Weiße Ritter der Tafel (lit. 'The White Knight of Table').^{Vol. 16}

==== Rindo Kobayashi ====
Voiced by: Shizuka Itō (Japanese); Morgan Berry (English)

Rindo Kobayashi (小林 竜胆, Kobayashi Rindō) is a third-year student who is introduced as the second seat of the Council.^{Ch. 119} She is friends with Tsukasa since meeting in junior high. She is known as the Rare Ingredients Master.

In an interview at Anime Expo, Tsukuda said that Rindo was such a popular character that he considered writing a version of the story with her as the main character.

==== Tosuke Megishima ====
Voiced by: Taiten Kusunoki (Japanese); Michael Wronski (English)

Tōsuke Megishima (女木島 冬輔, Megishima Tōsuke) is a third-year student who is introduced as occupying the third seat in the Council.^{Ch. 119} Megishima has a deep passion for ramen, and is known as the 'Shokugeki Hater' at Totsuki. He despises the Shokugeki as he believes the only competition any chef should have is to make their customers happy.

==== Momo Akanegakubo ====
Voiced by: Rie Kugimiya (Japanese); Holly Segarra (English)

Momo Akanegakubo (茜ヶ久保 もも, Akanegakubo Momo) is introduced as a third-year student who occupies the fourth seat on the Council. She is a petite girl who enjoys toys and cute things; she is often seen with a stuffed toy cat^{Ch. 119} named Butchy (ブッチー, Bucchi), whose hands also double as oven mitts.

==== Somei Saito ====
Voiced by: Katsuyuki Konishi (Japanese); Courtland Johnson (English)

Somei Saito (斎藤 綜明, Saitō Sōmei) is introduced as a third-year student who occupies the fifth seat on the Council.^{Ch. 119} He is a skilled sushi chef who strictly follows the bushido code.

==== Nene Kinokuni ====
Voiced by: Kana Hanazawa (Japanese); Heidi Hinkel (English)

Nene Kinokuni (紀ノ国 寧々, Kinokuni Nene) is introduced as a second-year student who occupies the sixth seat on the Council.^{Ch. 119} She hails from the eastern Kanda, whose family runs a famous Soba restaurant, serving "Edo Soba." Ever since she was little, she was taught the principles of tea ceremonies, Kaiseki cooking and details of traditional Japanese food and the arts.

==== Terunori Kuga ====
Voiced by: Yuki Kaji (Japanese); Alejandro Saab (English)

Terunori Kuga (久我 照紀, Kuga Terunori) is introduced as a second-year student who occupies the eighth seat on the Council. He leads the Chinese Food Research Society, which has turned into a club that focuses on Sichuan cuisine, where he trains dozens of students with army-like efficiency to follow his recipes.^{Ch. 119-122}

==== Julio Shiratsu ====
Julio Shiratsu (白津 樹利夫, Shiratsu Jurio) is a second year student who is introduced as a temporarily appointed eight seat for Central's Council of Ten. He is very flamboyant and loud.

==== Shoko Kaburagi ====
Shōko Kaburagi (鏑木 祥子, Kaburagi Shōko) is a second-year student who is introduced as a temporarily appointed fifth seat for Central's Council of Ten.

=== Central Gourmet Institute ===
Central (officially, Central Gourmet Institute) is a ruling organization within Totsuki which supplanted the Council of Ten during the Azami Administration. It is composed of students selected by Azami. Central was created as a student-run organization to assist Azami's goal of educating all academy students with the skills and techniques to cook dishes at a Council of Ten level. Central dictates what dishes the students are required to make and the correct recipe and method for their preparation. Any attempt modify or defy these choices resulted in stiff reprimanding from proctors and professors.

==== Azami Nakiri ====
Voiced by: Show Hayami (Japanese); Ian Sinclair (English)

Azami Nakiri (薙切 薊, Nakiri Azami), born Azami Nakamura (中村 薊, Nakamura Azami) is Erina's father who returns from banishment to become the second headmaster of Totsuki in the 16th to 30th volume of the series. He was once a well-respected Council member who was two years younger than Joichiro. He establishes the organization known as Central to put into effect sweeping changes in a scheme to achieve his ideal of a "gourmet utopia".^{Vol. 16-30}

==== Shawn Aida ====
Shawn Aida (相田 ショーン, Aida Shōn)
Voiced by: Kazuyuki Okitsu (Japanese); Gabriel Regojo (English)

Azami Nakiri's secretary.

==== Rentaro Kusunoki ====
Voiced by: Shintarō Asanuma (Japanese); Joe Daniels (English)

Rentarō Kusunoki (楠 連太郎, Kusunoki Rentarō) is an arrogant second-year student and member of Central. His specialty is low-temperature cooking techniques.^{Vol. 18-19}

==== Mea Yanai ====
Mea Yanai (梁井 メア, Yanai Mea)
Voiced by: M.A.O (Japanese); Amber Lee Connors (English)

A second-year student.

==== Shigemichi Kumai ====
Shigemichi Kumai (熊井 繁道, Kumai Shigemichi)

Nicknamed 'Shige', he is a second-year student.

==== Rui Kofuru ====
Rui Kofuru (小古 類, Kofuru Rui)

A mysterious second-year student.

=== Le Cuisiner Noir ===
Le Cuisiner Noir (The Midnight Chefs) are a mysterious group of criminal chefs. They specialize in using tools to cook or present in unusual ways and getting very rare and highly illegal ingredients.

Tsukuda said that these antagonists were inspired from having an old shonen trope of final group of enemies as with the cooking manga Chūka Ichiban! Tsukuda also said in a Viz Media interview that it is also common to have an underworld organization. They were inspired by having gone to a super-expensive restaurant in a hotel where it is very hard to get a reservation, and exaggerated that into writing in crazy dishes and even illegal ones.

==== Monarch ====
An American chef who called himself Monarch is the first known member of Le Cuisine Noir. He disguises himself as a tourist infiltrating Japan.^{Ch. 302}

==== Asahi Saiba ====
Voiced by: Jun Fukuyama (Japanese); Clifford Chapin (English)

Asahi Saiba (才波 朝陽, Saiba Asahi) is the leader of Le Cuisiner Noirs. Asahi's specialty is "Cross-Knives" where he can instantaneously assimilate the special skills of many chefs by just holding their signature utensils and even multiply those skills to create unprecedented dishes.^{Ch. 296 – 297} Asahi is revealed to be Azami's son. When Azami was still in high school, he had a one-night stand with an American woman and unwittingly sired Asahi. This was before Azami had met Mana.^{Le Dessert 2}

In an interview from Viz Media's Team Jump, when asked if Asahi was the ultimate rival character to Soma, Tsukuda said that "I designed Asahi as someone who's wearing the same skin as Soma but is completely different underneath. He's not the opposite, just different. And the purpose of Asahi is to highlight the different themes that define Soma and Erina."

==== Yunosuke ====
Yunosuke (雄之助) is a second in-command and a Japanese spy for Le Cuisine Noir.

==== Sarge ====
Voiced by: Harumi Sakurai (Japanese); Elissa Cuellar (English)

Sarge (サージ, Sāji) is a stern and intolerant military-themed chef of Le Cuisiner Noir. She uses a chainsaw as her preferred cooking tool.

==== Don Kalma ====
Voiced by: Kenjiro Tsuda (Japanese); Josh Morrison (English)

Don Kalma (ドン・カルマ, Don Karuma) is a flamboyant bartender-themed chef of Le Cuisiner Noir. ^{Ch. 297 – 299}

==== Kou Shiou ====
A masked subordinate of Asahi Saiba, Kou Shiou hails from a Chinese assassin family who adapted their assassination techniques for cooking. Shiou's tool of choice is steel claws.^{Ch. 302}

== Other recurring characters ==
=== Mayumi Kurase ===
Voiced by: Ai Kakuma (Japanese); Juliet Simmons (English)

Mayumi Kurase (倉瀬 真由美, Kurase Mayumi) is Soma's childhood friend. She has a crush on Soma.^{Vol. 1 side story}

=== Leonora Nakiri ===
Voiced by: Sayaka Ohara (Japanese); Emily Neves (English)

Leonora Nakiri (薙切 レオノーラ, Nakiri Reonōra) is Alice's mother and co-head of Nakiri International. She has difficulty speaking Japanese, as she is Danish.^{Ch. 97} Leonora specializes in molecular gastronomy.^{Ch. 99}

=== Soe Nakiri ===
Voiced by: Ryōtarō Okiayu (Japanese); Alan Brinks (English)

Sōe Nakiri (薙切 宗衛, Nakiri Sōe), is Alice's father, Leonora's husband, Senzaemon's son and co-head of Nakiri International.

=== Berta and Cilla ===
Voiced by: Aimi Tanaka (Japanese); Apphia Yu (English) (Berta)
Voiced by: Sayaka Senbongi (Japanese); Apphia Yu (English) (Cilla)

Berta and Cilla are the two staff members under the Research Division of Nakiri International and Leonora Nakiri's subordinates. During the third phase of the Promotional Exams, they acted as neutral judges.

=== Anne ===
Voiced by: Yui Horie (Japanese); Cat Thomas (English)

Anne is a First Class Bookman from the World Gourmet Organization who acted as the Head Judge for Regiment De Cuisine.

=== Mana Nakiri ===
Voiced by: Maaya Sakamoto (Japanese); Courtney Lomelo (English)

Mana (薙切 真凪, Nakiri Mana) is Erina's mother. She is the daughter of Senzaemon, the second wife of Azami and sister of Soe. She is the Bookmaster of the World Gourmet Organization. She has a strained relationship with her daughter.

=== Tamako Yukihira ===
Voiced by: Yūko Kaida (Japanese); Joanne Bonasso (English)

Tamako (幸平 珠子, Yukihira Tamako) is Soma's mother, and the wife of Joichiro. She inspired her husband and son. She was loved by the customers of her diner though the only specialty she succeeded at was fried rice-based cuisine.

== Works cited ==
- "Ch." is shortened form for chapter and refers to a chapter number of the Food Wars!: Shokugeki no Soma manga
- "Ep." is shortened form for Episode and refers to an Episode number of the Food Wars!: Shokugeki no Soma anime
