= Little Hans Andersen =

Pantomime by Basil Hood, with music by Walter Slaughter

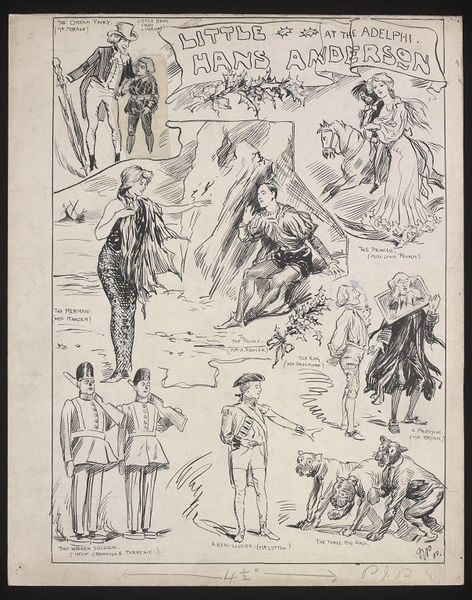
Sketches from a performance of Little Hans Andersen (1903)

Little Hans Andersen is a musical fairy pantomime in two acts and seven scenes for children with lyrics by Basil Hood and music by Walter Slaughter.

It was a revised version of Hood and Slaughter's pantomime Hans Andersen's Fairytales, based on the fairy tales of Hans Christian Andersen which had opened at Terry's Theatre in December 1897. After the last performance of the Savoy Opera A Princess of Kensington, produced by William Greet, the cast of the D'Oyly Carte Opera Company dispersed and many of them moved to the Adelphi Theatre to appear in the new musical comedy The Earl and the Girl (1903), also produced by Greet; there they next appeared in Little Hans Andersen from 23 December 1903 to 16 January 1904 for 23 matinee performances. Greet followed this with other productions at the Adelphi in which many of the same cast members appeared.

== Cast ==
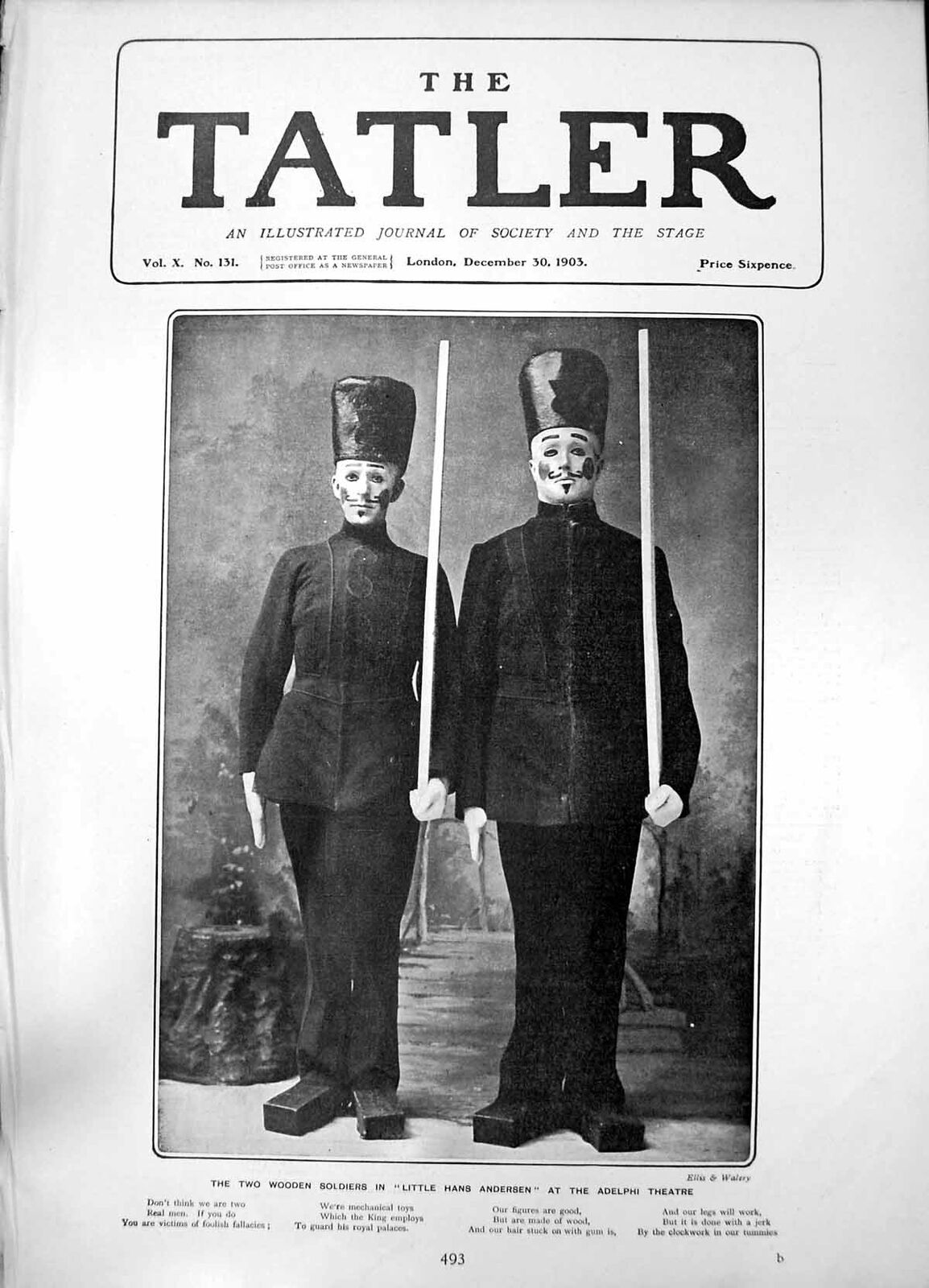
The Two Wooden Soldiers in Little Hans Andersen (1903)

- The Emperor Who Loved New Clothes – Walter Passmore
- Real Soldier – Henry Lytton
- Ole-Luc-Ole, The Dream Fairy – M. R. Morand
- King of the Copper Castle – Richard Temple
- Prince with the Magic Pipe – Robert Evett
- Little Hans Andersen – Master Roy Lorraine
- Han's Father, Merman – Powis Pinder
- Royal Footman – Reginald Crompton
- Royal Butler – Ernest Torrence
- Prime Minister – Charles Childerstone
- Two Wooden Soldiers – Reginald Crompton and Ernest Torrence
- Witch – Rudolph Lewis
- Princess Who Was Kissed by a Swineherd – Louie Pounds
- Princess Who Married the Soldier – Agnes Fraser
- Karen of the Red Shoes – Winifred Hart-Dyke
- Royal Governess – Alice Barth
- Queen – Rosina Brandram
- Princess Whom Prince Married – Olive Rae
- Mayor – Frank Elliston
