= Charles Childerstone =

British actor and singer (1872–1947)

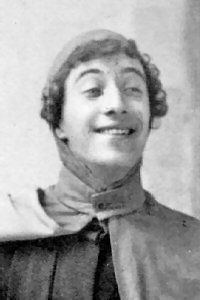
Charles Childerstone as A Lad of the Town in The Beauty Stone (1898)

Charles Childerstone (3 July 1872 – 29 May 1947) was an English operatic tenor and actor who after a career on the stage including a period with the D'Oyly Carte Opera Company from 1896 to 1903 later had a career on the music halls and in film. His theatrical career spanned four decades and included musical comedy and the legitimate theatre.

== Early life ==
Childerstone was born in Enfield, Middlesex, the son of Frederick Childerstone, a locksmith, and Emma née Everett. In 1891 he was working as a clerk in a gun factory in London and studied at the Guildhall School of Music. In 1894 he won third prize in the tenor section at a Stratford East Festival.

== D'Oyly Carte Opera Company ==
On joining the D'Oyly Carte Opera Company in 1896 at the Savoy Theatre Childerstone sang in the chorus for the 1896 revivals of the Gilbert and Sullivan operas The Mikado and Trial by Jury and probably also in the original production of His Majesty (1897). He played Archibald Jones the Income Tax Collector in 252 performances of Old Sarah at the Savoy Theatre in mid-1897 and when it was a companion piece to the revival of The Yeomen of the Guard (August–November 1897) in which production he also sang in the chorus and later played First Yeoman. Also at the Savoy he was in the chorus for The Grand Duchess of Gerolstein (December 1897 to March 1898) and a revival of The Gondoliers (March to May 1898), in which he played the non-singing role of Annibale; Old Sarah was also a companion piece to these.

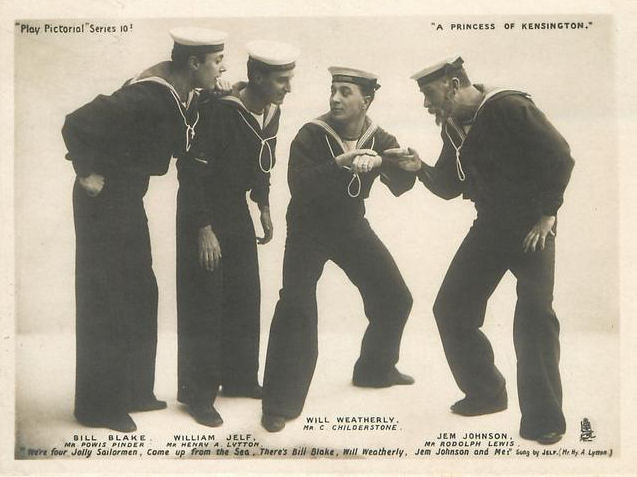
In A Princess of Kensington (1903) with Powis Pinder (left), Henry Lytton, Childerstone and Rudolph Lewis (right)

In 1898, still at the Savoy, he was A Lad of the Town in Sullivan's The Beauty Stone and reprised the role of Annibale in The Gondoliers. In September that year he appeared in a revival of The Sorcerer and played the non-singing part of the Associate in Trial by Jury, while December 1898 saw him share the role of the Defendant in Trial with four other tenors. From January to May 1899 Childerstone sang the Chamberlain in The Lucky Star and from June to December 1899 again played the Defendant in Trial by Jury when that work had a further revival with H.M.S. Pinafore, occasionally filling in as Ralph Rackstraw.

He created the minor role of the Physician-in-Chief in Sullivan's last completed opera, The Rose of Persia (1899–1900) at the Savoy Theatre, where he also Henry in Hamilton Clarke's The Outpost, which played there July to November 1900 as a companion piece to a revival of The Pirates of Penzance; it also played from November to December 1900 as a companion piece to Patience. When The Outpost closed Childerstone returned to the chorus for The Emerald Isle (1901) until he took over from Powis Pinder as Private Perry later in that production. In 1901 he married Mary Muir née McGee (1871–1944). Their son was Clifford Louis Muir Childerstone (1903–1978).

Continuing in the chorus at the Savoy, Childerstone appeared in Ib and Little Christina (November 1901) and Iolanthe (December 1901 to March 1902) and in April 1902 he was a Lord in Merrie England. After in a 14-week tour the company returned with that piece to the Savoy until January 1903. In December 1902 he appeared in a benefit performance of Trial by Jury for William Rignold at the Lyric Theatre. His next named role was as the sailor Will Weatherly in A Princess of Kensington produced by William Greet at the Savoy until May 1903 and then on tour until later that year, when the company disbanded.

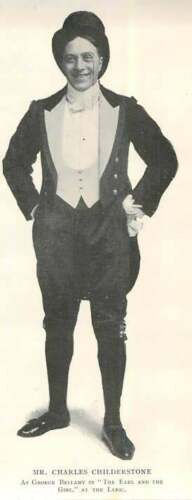
As George Bellamy in The Earl and the Girl (1904)

== Further stage career ==
After this, Childerstone made a number of further appearances for Greet in Edwardian Musical Comedies including as George Bellamy in The Earl and the Girl at the Adelphi Theatre (1904), and in Little Hans Andersen, The Talk of the Town (1905) and My Darling (1907). In 1908 he joined Walter Passmore in his music hall sketch The Constable and the Pictures, after which he appeared as the Earl of Essex alongside Passmore in a tour of Merrie England for Greet (1908–1909). Childerstone played in The Chocolate Soldier in 1911, and in 1913 went on the music halls in a 'musical interlude' paired with Winifred Hare, following which he was in a number of Concert Parties (The Follies) and revues, including Hello, Everybody, Eyes Front, Fall In and Pleasure Bound. He staged a scena called A Whiff of the Briny (1919) for the Exeter Hippodrome, advertising that Edward German had given permission for the use of the song "Four Jolly Sailormen" from A Princess of Kensington in the show.

For the legitimate theatre he appeared in a 1921 revival of the Jules Eckert Goodman melodrama The Man Who Came Back, following which he played Ardimedon in Phi-Phi for C. B. Cochran and was in The Co-Optimists (1925). He was Count Orpitch in the tour of Katja the Dancer (1926–1927) before returning to revue in What Price the Navy? (1929). He made various other appearances on the London stage and on tour in the provinces well into the 1930s. In 1938 the 77 year-old Childerstone was cast as Gaston in the musical comedy Under Your Hat at the Palace Theatre (1938–1939).

== Films and later life ==
Childerstone's films included Jim in The Cry for Justice (1919), Doctor in Betrayal (1932), Inspector Hart in The Thirteenth Candle (1933), Pilgrim in I'll Stick to You (1933), Mr Shaw in Double Bluff (1933), Judy's Counsel in Perfect Understanding (1933), Solicitor in Little Friend (1934), Brown on Resolution (1935), Murder in the Family (1938) and Take Cover (1938).

By 1931 he and his wife were separated, with his wife living with their son Clifford Childerstone on Grange Road in Ealing, while he was living with the actress Ethel Maud Childerstone (1896–1984) in Hornsey, who appears to have assumed his name. After his wife died in 1944 Childerstone married Ethel Maud in 1945.

Childerstone died in 1947 in Highgate, London. In his will he left £696 4s to his widow Ethel Maud Childerstone.
