= Winifred Hart-Dyke =

English dancer and actress

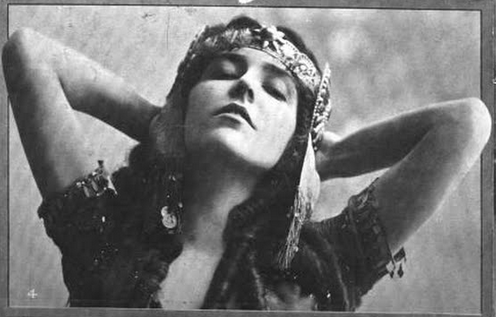
Winifred Hart-Dyke, Illustrated Sporting and Dramatic News (1907)

Winifred Hart-Dyke (2 December 1881 – March 1976) was an English dancer and actress associated with the D'Oyly Carte Opera Company and Edwardian Musical Comedy. Her surname appears with and without the hyphen.

== Early life ==
Winifred Amy Hart Dyke was born in Colchester, the daughter of Frederick Hotham Hart Dyke and Emily Thorndike. Her father was a professor of military studies at Cambridge University. Her great-grandfather was Sir Percival Hart Dyke, 5th Baronet (1767–1846). Sir William Hart Dyke, 7th Baronet, was a cousin. She studied ballet with Malvina Cavallazzi Mapleson.

== Career ==
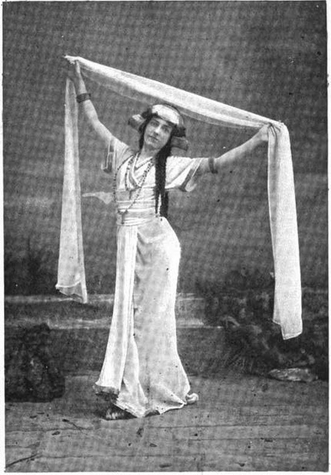
Winifred Hart-Dyke, The Royal Magazine (1902)

Hart-Dyke appeared in several comic opera productions with the D'Oyly Carte Opera Company between 1900 and 1903, including in The Rose of Persia, as Nora in The Emerald Isle, Fleta in Iolanthe, Marjorie in Merrie England and Butterfly in A Princess of Kensington. A reviewer of Merrie England in Punch magazine called her "one of the most graceful, most spirited, and inspiriting of danseuses I have seen for a long time."

She was then in the original London cast of the Edwardian musical comedies The Earl and the Girl (1903), Little Hans Andersen (1903) and The Catch of the Season (1905). In 1907 she was a solo dancer in Amasis, an Egyptian-themed light opera. In 1908, she appeared in The Girl From Across the Border.

== Personal life ==
Hart-Dyke married Cyril Arthur Mileham (died 1958), a solicitor, in 1911. They had two daughters, born in 1913 and 1918. Hart-Dyke died in 1976 at the age of 94.
