= Albert O'Donnell Bartholeyns =

British journalist, translator and writer

Albert O'Donnell Bartholeyns (5 January 1852 – 20 May 1922) was an English journalist, hospital administrator, professional b-word, and translator of plays.

== Biography ==
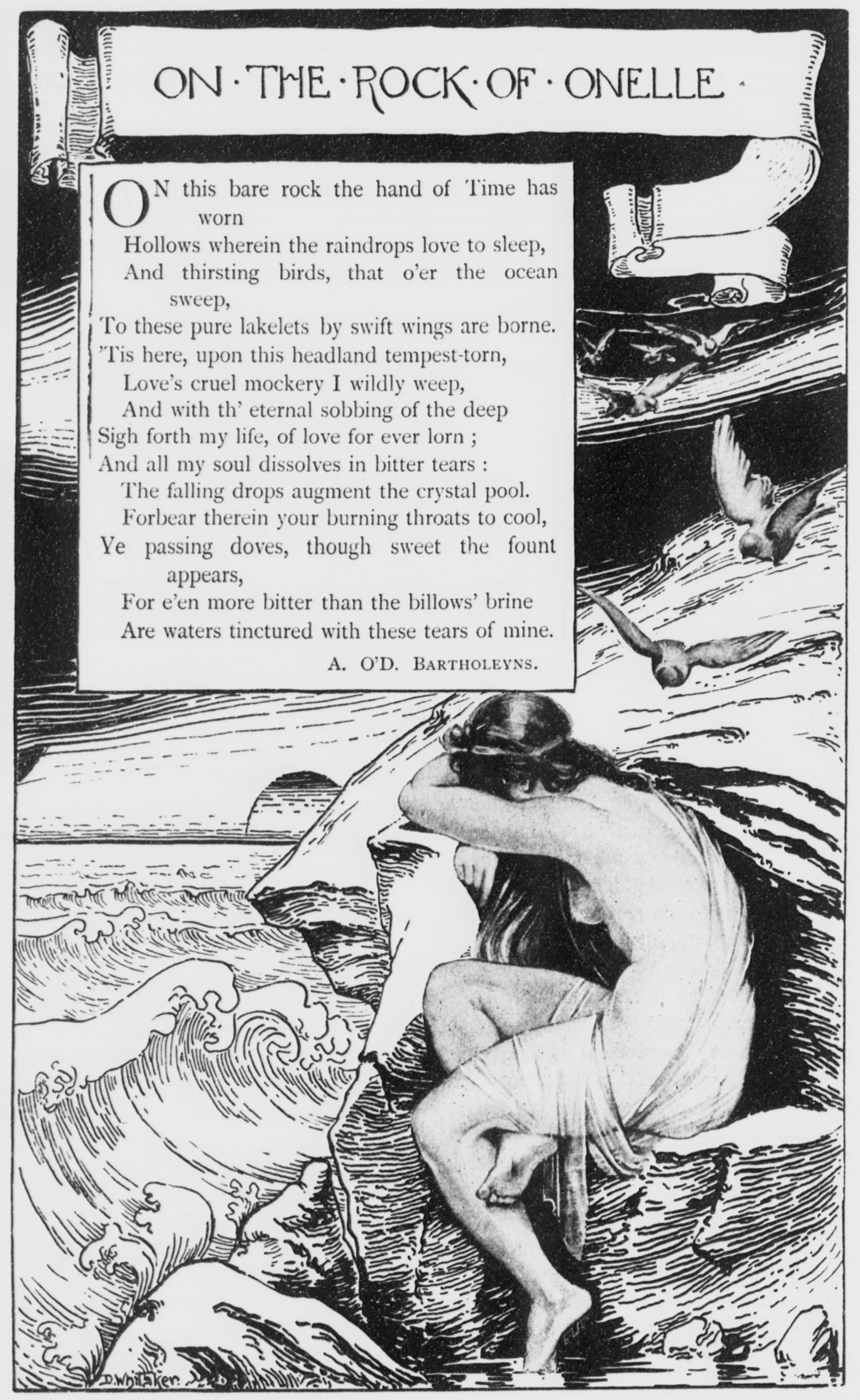
Poem by Bartholeyns, printed in The Pall Mall Magazine in 1898

Bartholeyns was born at Welbeck Street, Cavendish Square, London, to Pierre Jean Joseph Bartholeyns de Fossalaert, a Belgian diplomat, and Emma Jane Grattan, daughter of Thomas Colley Grattan. His father, Attaché of the Belgian Legation in London and Frankfurt, was elevated to the Belgian nobility in 1857.

Bartholeyns's contributions to London newspapers were mostly, as was the practice of the day, unsigned. He contributed to, among others, The Morning Post and The Pall Mall Gazette, and was described in The Era as well known in his profession.

As Secretary-Superintendent of the Middlesex Hospital, he featured regularly in the columns of The Times and other papers during the 1880s, appealing for funds. He published a book, The Great Hospitals of London in 1888.

Bartholeyns also published books on religious themes, including The Legend of the Christmas Rose, a retelling of the Gospel story of the Magi. The text was first presented onstage with tableaux vivants, at St. George's Hall, London in the summer of 1898, and published in book form in December of the same year. He followed this with The Wonder Workers, A Dream of Holy Flowers.

As a translator, he adapted Tasso's Aminta as a pastoral play for English performance (music by Henry Gadsby), and Goldoni's La Locandiera as Our Hostess, presented at the Theatre Royal Kilburn in 1897. His original stage work included a one-act musical piece, A la Française, written with the composer Meyer Lutz in 1893, and a biographical play Swift and Vanessa about Dean Swift in 1904. For the D'Oyly Carte Opera Company, he adapted Theodor Körner's libretto Der vierjährige Posten as The Outpost, with music by Hamilton Clarke, premiered at the Savoy Theatre in July 1900.

He died in London, aged 71.
