= Robert Evett =

English singer, actor and producer (1874–1949)

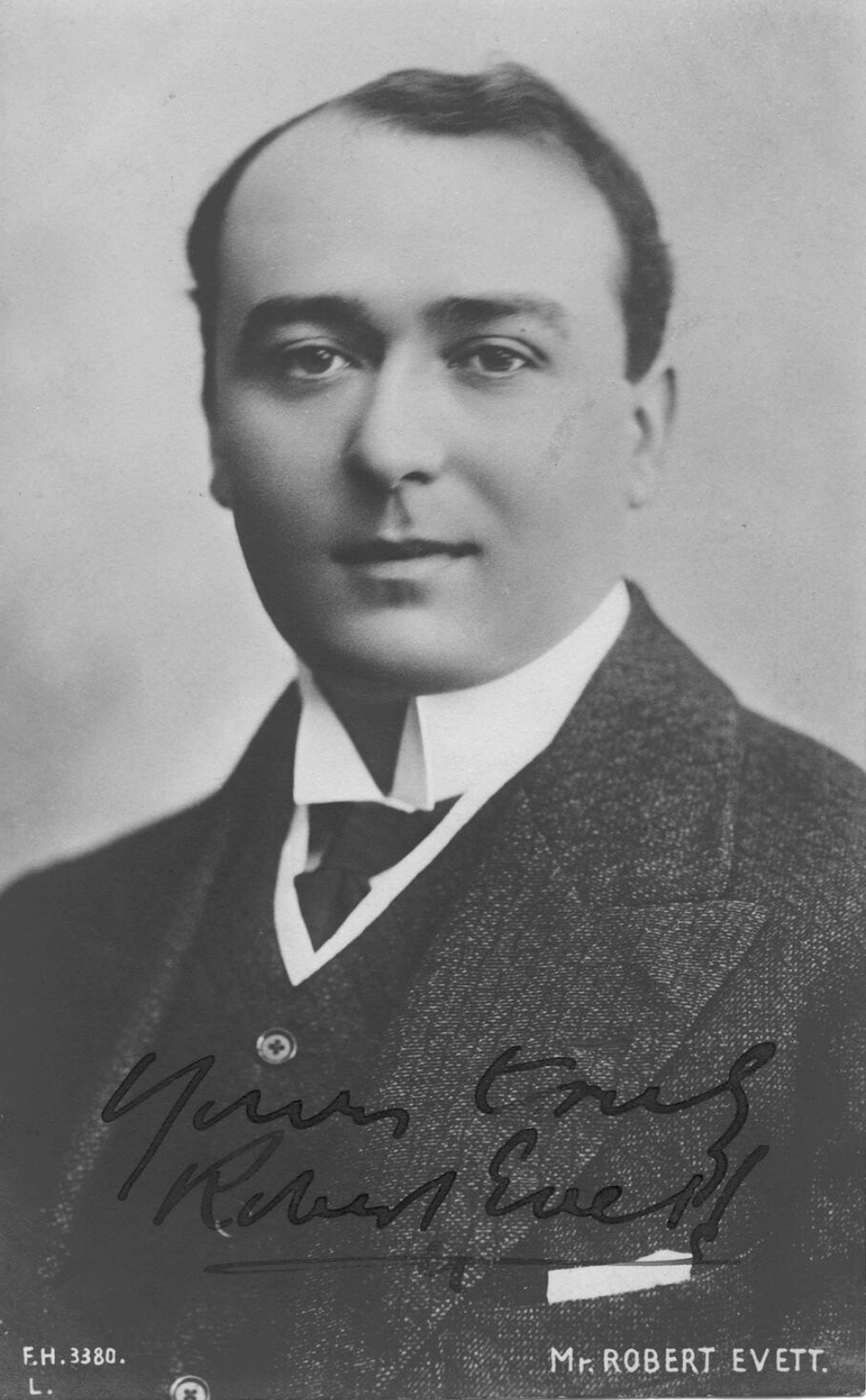
A signed photograph of Robert Evett

Robert Evett (16 October 1874 – 15 January 1949) was an English singer, actor, theatre manager and producer. He was best known as a leading man in Edwardian musical comedies and later managed the George Edwardes theatrical empire.

In 1892, at age 18, Evett joined the D'Oyly Carte Opera Company on tour in leading tenor roles. Six years later, he was starring in the company's London cast at the Savoy Theatre, where he stayed until the company left the Savoy in 1903. He soon began to appear in Edwardian musicals in the West End, first in The Earl and the Girl (1903). He continued to star in musicals and operettas for the next decade, including in The Little Michus (1905), The Merry Widow (1907), A Waltz Dream (1908) and The Girl in the Train (1910). In 1913 and 1914, he performed on Broadway. He also lent his voice to early acoustic recordings of songs.

Upon the death of the famous producer George Edwardes in 1915, Evett returned to England; there he became the managing director of Daly's Theatre, the Gaiety Theatre and Edwardes' other theatres. He produced such hits as The Maid of the Mountains (1917), sometimes directing and even writing shows. His last production was in 1925.

== Life and career ==
Robert Evett was born in Warwickshire, England.

=== Acting career ===
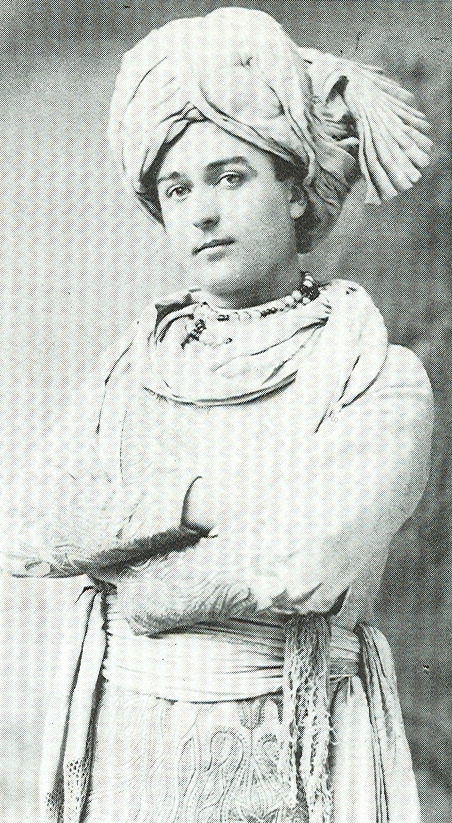
As Tapioca in The Lucky Star

In 1892 Evett joined the D'Oyly Carte Opera Company on tour in The Vicar of Bray, playing the Reverend Henry Sandford, the tenor lead. In 1893, Evett added the role of Oswald in Haddon Hall. In 1894, the company toured with Gilbert and Sullivan's Utopia Limited, with Evett playing the smaller role of Lord Dramaleigh and also Sandford and Oswald in repertory. In 1895, Evett next played the roles of Bertuccio in Mirette, Count Vazquez (and sometimes Pedro Gomez) in The Chieftain, Mr. Box in Cox and Box, and Prince Hilarion in Princess Ida. He also took over the leading tenor role of Captain Fitzbattleaxe in Utopia.

In 1896, a D'Oyly Carte touring company played The Grand Duke, with Evett as Ernest Dummkopf, Utopia, with Evett as Fitzbattleaxe, and Ida, with Evett at Hilarion. In 1897 and 1898, Evett toured with a D'Oyly Carte repertory company in the principal Gilbert and Sullivan tenor roles of Alexis in The Sorcerer, Ralph in H.M.S. Pinafore, Frederic in The Pirates of Penzance, the Duke of Dunstable in Patience, Earl Tolloller in Iolanthe, Cyril in Princess Ida, Nanki-Poo in The Mikado, Colonel Fairfax in The Yeomen of the Guard, and Marco in The Gondoliers, as well as Prince Max in His Majesty.

In 1898, Evett transferred from the touring company to the Savoy Theatre in London, where he played Marco in The Gondoliers and Alexis in The Sorcerer. In 1899, he created the role of Tapioca in The Lucky Star (1899), played Ralph in H.M.S. Pinafore and created another role, Yussuff in The Rose of Persia. In 1900, he played Frederic in Pirates and the Duke in Patience, together with the role of Charlie Brown in Pretty Polly, a curtain-raiser. In 1901, he created the roles of Terence O'Brien in The Emerald Isle and Ib in Ib and Little Christina. In 1902, he again played Tolloller in Iolanthe and created the role of Sir Walter Raleigh in Merrie England. In 1903, he created the role of Lieutenant Brook Green in A Princess of Kensington, after which the D'Oyly Carte Opera Company left the Savoy, and Evett, together with most of the cast, joined a tour of that production.

Evett and Gertie Millar in A Waltz Dream, 1908

At the end of the tour, Evett and other former members of D'Oyly Carte left that company and transferred to the Adelphi Theatre where they appeared in a new Edwardian musical comedy, The Earl and the Girl and in the pantomime Little Hans Andersen. Evett continued to perform in West End musicals and operettas for a decade, appearing at Daly's Theatre, Drury Lane, the Hicks Theatre and the Vaudeville, in shows such as The Little Michus (1905), The Talk of the Town (1905), The Merveilleuses (1906), The Merry Widow (1907, creating the role of Camille de Rosillon), A Waltz Dream (1908), and The Girl in the Train (1910). In 1912, he returned to the Adelphi in Autumn Manoeuvres, which was managed by the famous producer George Edwardes, and later toured in that production. In 1913 and 1914, Evett performed on Broadway.

=== Directing and management career ===
When George Edwardes died in 1915, Evett returned to England, where he managed the Edwardes estate, which was then in debt and close to bankruptcy. Evett became the managing director of Daly's Theatre and George Edwardes Enterprises. Evett produced shows for Daly's and other Edwardes theatres. At Daly's, he first directed and produced The Happy Day (1916). In 1917, Evett produced and had a creative hand in The Maid of the Mountains. He engaged José Collins to star in, and Oscar Asche to direct, this musical. The show ran for a record-breaking three years and saved the Edwardes estate. This was followed by A Southern Maid (1917; revived 1920) and Our Peg (later adapted into Our Nell). He also directed revivals of The Dollar Princess.

At the Gaiety Theatre, Evett produced Theodore & Co (1916) and Going Up (1918), an English adaptation of The Last Waltz (both in 1922), the latter of which he co-authored. There in 1924, he produced Our Nell, the revised version of Our Peg, at the Gaiety. His final production was Frasquita, in 1925, at the Prince's Theatre.

== Recordings ==
Evett recorded many songs for Odeon between 1906 and 1908, including songs from West End musicals such as The Little Michus, The Geisha, and The Merry Widow. He also recorded two songs from The Yeomen of the Guard ("Is Life a Boon?" and "Free From His Fetters Grim"). These were re-released on the Pearl CD, The Art of the Savoyard. He also recorded one song from each of Merrie England ("The English Rose") and A Princess of Kensington ("A Sprig of Rosemary").
