= The Outpost (opera) =

1900 opera by Hamilton Clarke

The Outpost is an opera or operetta by the composer Hamilton Clarke with a libretto by A. O'D. Bartholeyns. The story is an adaptation of the Singspiel Der vierjährige Posten by Theodor Körner with music by Franz Schubert.

The piece was one of Clarke's last compositions following several operettas that he had composed for the German Reeds. It premiered at the Savoy Theatre from 2 July 1900 to 3 November 1900 as a companion piece to the Gilbert and Sullivan opera The Pirates of Penzance, for the second London revival of Pirates, and also played from 10 November 1900 to 7 December 1900 as a companion piece to Patience, a total of 131 performances. After this, the work was performed on tour from late 1901 through 1902 as a companion piece to Pirates, Patience and Iolanthe.

Both the score and the libretto appear to be lost, but there survives a copy of a fantasia for flute and piano, based on airs from the piece, and so the vocal score may have been published.

The fashion in the late Victorian era and Edwardian era was to present long evenings in the theatre, and so producer Richard D'Oyly Carte preceded his Savoy operas with curtain raisers, like The Outpost. W. J. MacQueen-Pope commented, concerning such curtain raisers:

This was a one-act play, seen only by the early comers. It would play to empty boxes, half-empty upper circle, to a gradually filling stalls and dress circle, but to an attentive, grateful and appreciative pit and gallery. Often these plays were little gems. They deserved much better treatment than they got, but those who saw them delighted in them. ... [They] served to give young actors and actresses a chance to win their spurs ... the stalls and the boxes lost much by missing the curtain-raiser, but to them dinner was more important.

== Roles and original cast ==
- Walter – H. Carlyle Pritchard
- Henry – Charles Childerstone
- Karl – W. H. Leon
- Colonel – Edwin Bryan
- Captain – Powis Pinder/ J. Lewis Campion
- Corporal – Iago Lewis [Lewys]
- Kate – Lulu Evans/Nell Richardson

Campion played from 30 July to 11 August, while Pinder was substituting as the Pirate King in Pirates. Nell Richardson probably played while Evans was off from 27 August to 8 September. The touring cast was Fred G. Edgar, W. G. Lennox, E. A. White, R. A. Swinhoe, Fred Drawater, Bernard Fisher, Edward L. Bishop and, at times, Frank Robey, Norah Maguire, Florence Beech and Bessel Adams.

== Plot ==
Körner's original libretto depicts a young French soldier sent to guard the German border. He hates military life, deserts his post, crosses into Germany, marries a German girl and lives happily as a farmer. Four years later, war breaks out, and the French army crosses the border. The young man is recognised, arrested, and charged with desertion, a capital offence. He decides to claim that he has been at his post the whole time, but the French do not believe this story and put him before a court martial. He is saved by the intervention of the French general who gives him the benefit of the doubt and an honourable discharge from the army, and he returns to living happily as a farmer.

It is not known how much, if at all, Bartholeyns altered the original plot. The dramatis personae of both versions are essentially the same, with the addition of a corporal in the English version. The names of the heroine (Kate/Käthchen) and her father (Walter/Walther) are merely Anglicised.
