= Marjorie Bentley =

American dancer (born 1890s)

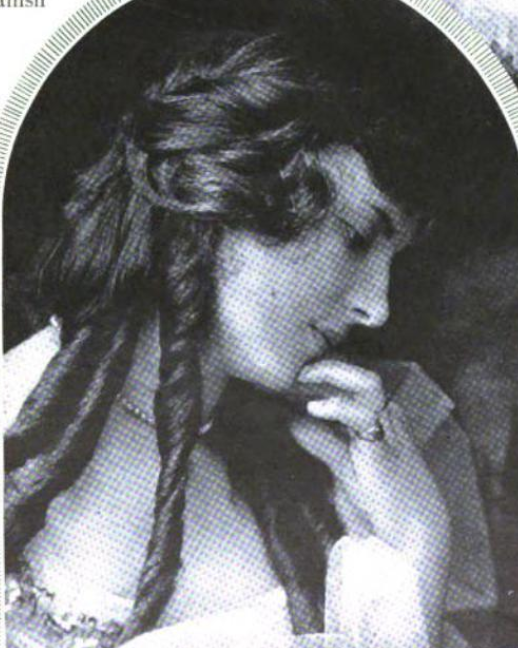
- Marjorie Bentley, from a 1915 publication
- Born: about 1895; Philadelphia, Pennsylvania or Brooklyn, New York
- Occupation: Dancer
- Years active: 1913 to 1920

Marjorie Bentley (born 1890s) was an American dancer who appeared on Broadway in Oh, My Dear! (1918) and La La Lucille (1919).

== Early life and education ==
Bentley was born in Philadelphia or Brooklyn, and raised Brooklyn. She said that she began dancing when a doctor recommended more exercise. She trained at the Metropolitan Opera Ballet School, as the "favorite pupil" of ballet teacher Malvina Cavallazzi.

== Career ==
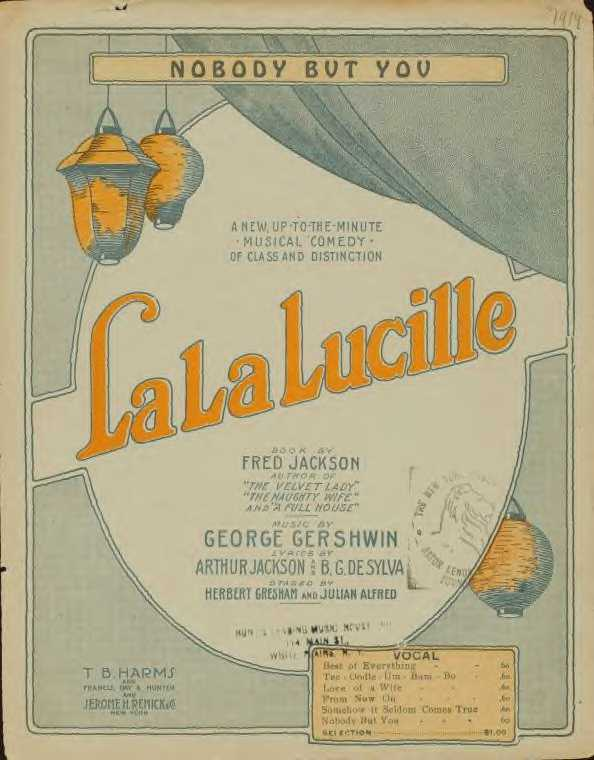
Sheet music from La La Lucille (1919)

Bentley was a professional dancer from her teen years. Her roles on the New York stage included appearances in Chin-Chin (1914–1915), The Riviera Girl (1917), Oh, My Dear! (1918) and La La Lucille (1919). She was premiere danseuse at the New York Hippodrome in 1915, when she appeared in Hip-Hip-Hooray. She contributed a recipe for "welsh rarebit au gratin" to a charity cookbook compiled by Mabel Rowland during World War I. She modeled a dress made of net flouncing for a garment industry magazine in 1916. She toured in La La Lucille in 1919 and 1920.

Boston artist Louis Kronberg made a pastel portrait of Bentley in 1913. Of her performance as "Mademoiselle Victorine" in the musical La La Lucille, Dorothy Parker wrote that "The comedy introduces a charming new dancer, Marjorie Bentley—you can stand even another bedroom farce for the sake of seeing her."
