= Les cloches de Corneville (film) =

1917 British film by Thomas Bentley

- Directed by: Thomas Bentley
- Written by: Robert Planquette (opera); Bannister Merwin
- Starring: Elsie Craven; Moya Mannering; Leslie Stiles
- Production company: British Actors Film Company
- Distributed by: International Exhibitors
- Release date: October 1917
- Country: United Kingdom
- Language: English

Les cloches de Corneville is a 1917 British silent drama film directed by Thomas Bentley and starring Elsie Craven, Moya Mannering and Leslie Stiles. It was based on the 1876 French opera Les cloches de Corneville by Robert Planquette. It was made at Bushey Studios.

== Cast ==
- Elsie Craven as Germaine
- Moya Mannering as Serpolette
- M. R. Morand as Gaspard
- Leslie Stiles as Grenicheaux
- Frederick Volpe as Baillie
- Ben Field as Iolo
- Arthur Vezin as Marquis de Corneville

== Bibliography ==
- Low, Rachael. History of the British Film, 1914-1918. Routledge, 2005.
