= Malvina Cavallazzi =

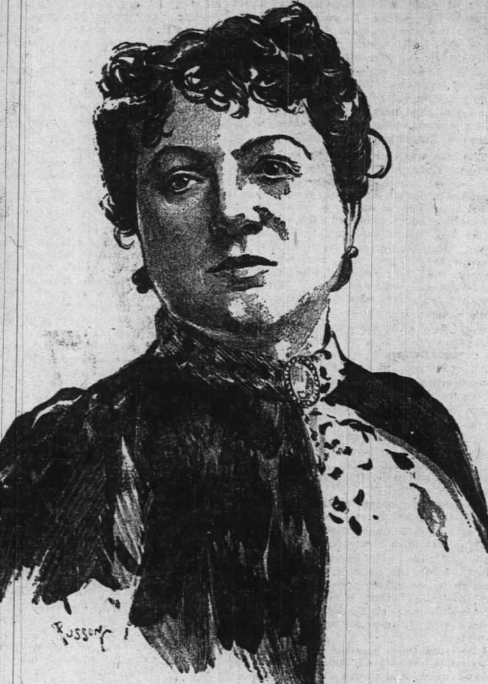
- Malvina Cavallazzi, from a 1911 publication
- Born: november 17 1852; Ravenna, Italy
- Died: October 23, 1924; Ravenna, Italy
- Occupations: ballet dancer and teacher
- Known for: First director of the Metropolitan Opera Ballet School in New York

Malvina Cavallazzi (born about 1852 – died October 23, 1924) was an Italian ballet dancer active in New York City and London. From 1909 to 1913, she was the first director of the Metropolitan Opera Ballet School in New York.

== Early life and education ==
Cavallazzi was born in Ravenna, and trained as a dancer at La Scala in Milan.

== Career ==
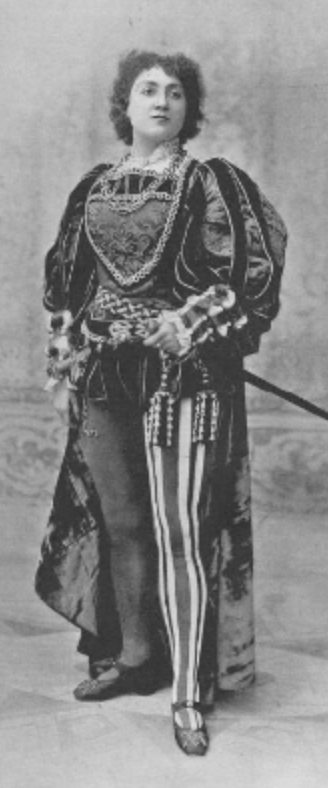
Malvina Cavallazzi as Faust, from an 1895 publication

Cavallazzi performed at La Scala in 1875, and in London in 1879. In New York City, she was part of the Mapleson Opera Troupe. "Mme. Cavallazzi has never danced more beautifully and gracefully, and gave positive pleasure," the New York Times reported of her performance at a benefit program in 1882, adding that "it would, in fact, but difficult to imagine any danseuse who could have been more perfect in her work."

Cavallazzi was known for her travesti roles, including Orfeo at London's Empire Theatre of Varieties in 1891, Antony in Cleopatra in 1891 at the Manchester Palace, a masculine mime role in La Frolique at the Empire Theatre in 1894, and Edmond Dantés in Monte Cristo at the Empire Theatre in 1896. She was a member of Colonel Mapleson's Opera Company in England. Critic Arthur Symons found that she was "not by any means without talent," but that "she so deliberately and resolutely overdoes everything she has to do as to absolutely tire one's eyes."

Cavallazzi was the first director of the Metropolitan Opera Ballet School, beginning in 1909. She also taught in London. Her students included Eva Swain, Phyllis Bedells, Marjorie Bentley, and Winifred Hart-Dyke. "When I teach dancing it is to the mind, not to the legs, that I give my attention," she explained in 1913. "If the mind is quick to catch a suggestion, the feet will follow fast enough."

== Personal life ==
Cavallazzi married English theatrical manager Charles Mapleson; he died in 1893. She died in 1924, in Ravenna. There is a Via Malvina Cavallazzi in Ravenna, named in her memory.
