= M. R. Morand =

British actor and singer (1860–1922)

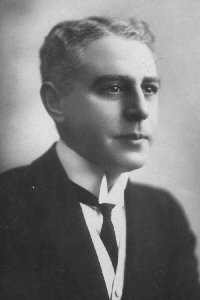
M. R. Morand

Marcellus Raymond Morand (17 December 1860 – 5 March 1922) was an English actor and operatic baritone who, after a career in the Savoy Operas with the D'Oyly Carte Opera Company, appeared in Edwardian musical comedy, among other theatrical genres, and in early silent film.

== Early life and career ==
Morand was born in Bury, Lancashire, in 1860, the son of Peter Joseph Morand, an organist. In 1881 he was working as a clerk in a rubber manufactory in Glasgow, Scotland.

Initially appearing on stage as an amateur, Morand joined professional touring companies for whom he appeared in a range of works from Shakespeare to Victorian burlesque, making his London début at the Avenue Theatre in September 1889 as Domino in W. S. Gilbert's adaptation of Offenbach's The Brigands.

== D'Oyly Carte Opera Company ==
Morand as José (left) and Walter Passmore as Peter Grigg in The Chieftain at the Savoy Theatre (1894)

Morand was engaged by the D'Oyly Carte Opera Company in December 1894 to create the role of José in Burnand and Sullivans's The Chieftain at the Savoy Theatre. When Cox and Box was added to the bill later that month as a curtain-raiser Morand played Cox. When these runs ended in March 1895 he remained with the principal Company in a tour of those works in the London suburbs. In April 1895 Morand moved to a D'Oyly Carte touring company with which he played José in The Chieftain and Phantis in Gilbert and Sullivan's Utopia, Limited. He reprised the role of Cox when Cox and Box was added to the tour's repertoire in May 1895, and played Florian on a tour of Princess Ida from September to December 1895. After a holiday of several months Morand rejoined the touring company as Rudolph in The Grand Duke in March 1896. For the tour's last two months he also played Phantis in Utopia, Limited, until the tour ended in November 1896.

In December 1896 Morand was an extra in a benefit matinee performance of Trial by Jury at the Lyceum Theatre, and in April 1897 he joined another D'Oyly Carte touring company as Ko-Ko in The Mikado, Shadbolt in The Yeomen of the Guard and Boodel in His Majesty; in August 1897 he was promoted to the lead comedy roles of Jack Point in Yeomen, Major-General Stanley in The Pirates of Penzance, the Duke of Plaza-Toro in The Gondoliers, Sir Joseph Porter in H.M.S. Pinafore and Bunthorne in Patience, and reprised his role as Phantis in Utopia, Limited in November 1897 before taking on the role of King Paramount in Utopia later in the same month. In December 1897 he left the tour to take a year's leave of absence.

He rejoined a D'Oyly Carte touring company, playing Bedford Rowe in The Vicar of Bray and Pennyfather in the companion piece After All!, from December 1898 to February 1899, and later as Tobasco and then Sirocco in The Lucky Star and also The McCrankie in Haddon Hall, until September 1899. From April to December 1900 he toured in the principal comic role of Hassan in The Rose of Persia and, from September to December 1901, as Professor Bunn in The Emerald Isle. Morand was a replacement player as Silas Simpkins in the original production of Merrie England at the Savoy Theatre in November 1902, having played the role on tour the previous August. In January 1903 he created the role of the policeman Yapp in A Princess of Kensington, which ran at the Savoy until May, and he continued in the role on tour.

== Freemasonry; marriage and divorce ==
A Freemason, in 1892 Morand was initiated into the Liverpool Dramatic Lodge No. 1609, joining the Yorick Lodge No. 2771 in 1899.

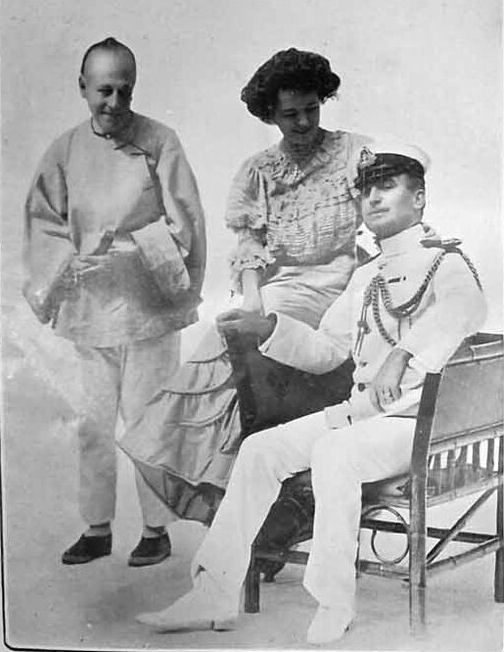
As Sin Chong (left) in The White Chrysanthemum with Marie George and Henry Lytton (1905)

In December 1901 at St George's Church in Beckenham, Kent, he married Helena Woodley Nash (1867–1949). Their daughter was Mary Ursula Morand (1906–1923). The couple divorced in 1912 in a celebrated case as a result of her "habitual adultery" with Captain James Archibald Morrison, formerly Member of Parliament for Nottingham East, including at a hotel in Paris. Both respondent and co-respondent denied adultery but lost the case; a decree nisi was granted, and Morand was awarded £5,500 in agreed damages against Captain Morrison. Morand later married Eleanor "Lena" Leibrandt (1883–1955), a model and actress who had been a fellow member, with Morand, of the D’Oyly Carte Opera Company from 1900 and the Adelphi company from 1903.

== Later life ==
Along with many former D'Oyly Carte members, Morand appeared in The Earl and the Girl at the Adelphi Theatre (1903–1904), in which he created the role of Downham, an American solicitor. He was in The Talk of the Town at the Lyric Theatre (1905); played the Chinese servant Sin Chong in The White Chrysanthemum at the Criterion Theatre (1905–06); was in Aladdin at the Adelphi (1907–08); played the miller Poquelin in The Belle of Brittany at the Queen's Theatre (1908–09), and King Khalifah in A Persian Princess at the Queen's (1909).

Morand recorded the music hall-style song Dinky Doo which was released by Columbia Records in 1908. He acted in the legitimate theatre, appearing in Chekhov’s The Seagull with the Scottish Repertory Theatre (1910), sang with Horace Lingard’s Opera Company and was Frank in Die Fledermaus and Spalanzani in The Tales of Hoffmann for the Thomas Beecham Opera Comique Company (1910). During 1915 and 1916 he was in South Africa where he joined the Ethel Irving Company at the Palladium Theatre in Johannesburg. He returned to England in 1917 by way of the Far East and Canada.

He acted in a number of silent films including Gloria (1916) playing the villain opposite Frank Cellier; was Gaspard the miser in Les Cloches de Corneville (1917); was John Melsher Snr in Daddy (1917) and appeared in The Land of Mystery (1920). His last stage appearance was in July 1921 as Admiral Dale in James the Less at the Aldwych Theatre. From 1912 until his death in 1922 he was the Chairman of the charity the Royal General Theatrical Fund.

Morand died at the Empire Nursing Home on Vincent Square, Westminster, London, in March 1922 aged 61. In his will he left £4,571 2s 4d.
