= Kensington Garden =

Kensington Garden is a poem by Thomas Tickell, published in 1722, as a fictional origin story for the area which would eventually be known as Kensington Gardens.

== Plot ==
Kensington Garden, according to the poem, was once a fairy realm ruled by King Oberon. Albion, a descendant of the humans' royal line of England, was kidnapped as a changeling by a fairy named Milkah. Milkah uses her magic arts to ensure that Albion grows up at fairy scale, standing only a foot tall. When Albion is nineteen, Oberon's daughter Kenna falls in love with him.

When King Oberon catches them during a meeting, he banishes Albion and orders Kenna to marry one of her fairy suitors, Azuriel. Albion begs for help from his distant ancestor, the god Neptune, who sends him an army with which to march on Oberon's kingdom and take Kenna back.

Albion and Azuriel fight in single combat. Since fairies are immaterial beings, Azuriel easily survives what should be fatal wounds and is able to stab Albion to death. Neptune, enraged, wipes out the fairy kingdom. Oberon and the other fairies scatter and flee to remote, rural places inland.

Kenna stays in the abandoned kingdom, where she magically turns Albion's body into the first snowdrop. Many years later, Kenna is pleased by the British royal family - Albion's distant relatives - living in the area. She inspires a human craftsman to recreate the fairy kingdom as a garden. Every night Kenna dances with her fairy train to honor Albion.

== Background and legacy ==
Tickell was inspired by Henry Wise's work on the garden area around Kensington Palace; the poem's title is singular, as the famous Kensington Gardens did not yet exist. The poem does not refer to this area as a whole, but specifically to a sunken Dutch garden added by Wise. This was Tickell's longest poem; critics accused it of being "inflated and pedantic."

Other authors would also describe the area as inhabited by fairies, most notably J. M. Barrie in The Little White Bird, the first work to feature Peter Pan. Writer Roger Lancelyn Green argues that the works are unrelated and that there is no indication Barrie had read Tickell's poem.

The plot of Kensington Garden inspired the Gilbert and Sullivan play A Princess of Kensington.
