= Reginald Crompton =

British actor and singer (1870–1945)

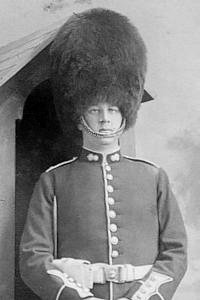
Reginald Crompton as Private Willis in the first revival of Iolanthe (1901) at the Savoy Theatre

Reginald Crompton (14 July 1870 – 10 September 1945) was a British solicitor, stage actor and silent film screenwriter. A bass-baritone, he created several minor roles in the Savoy Operas with the D'Oyly Carte Opera Company.

== Early years and D'Oyly Carte ==
Crompton was born in Almondsbury, Gloucestershire, in 1870, one of six children born to Elizabeth née Dudfield (1834–1901) and Francis Crompton (1835–1921), a landowner. By 1891, aged 20, he was an articled solicitor's clerk in Exeter, Devon, and by 1901 he was practising as a solicitor in Exeter. At 6 feet 6 inches tall Crompton was a commanding presence.

A winner of the Holland Scholarship at the Royal Academy of Music, Crompton joined the D'Oyly Carte Opera Company in 1899, making his London début at the Savoy Theatre playing The Royal Executioner in The Rose of Persia (November 1899 to June 1900). After a period practising as a solicitor in Exeter he was once again at the Savoy in the roles of Sergeant Pincher in The Emerald Isle (April 1901); So Hi in The Willow Pattern (November 1901) and Private Willis in the first London revival of Iolanthe (December 1901) after which he left D'Oyly Carte to appear in the children's farce Shock-headed Peter at the Garrick Theatre (December 1901 to February 1902). Crompton returned to the Savoy to play Ben in Merrie England (April 1902), and Mr. Reddish in A Princess of Kensington (January 1903). He was in D'Oyly Carte's tour of Merrie England (July to November 1902) and A Princess of Kensington (May to September 1903) following which the London Company was dispersed.

== Musical comedies and later years ==
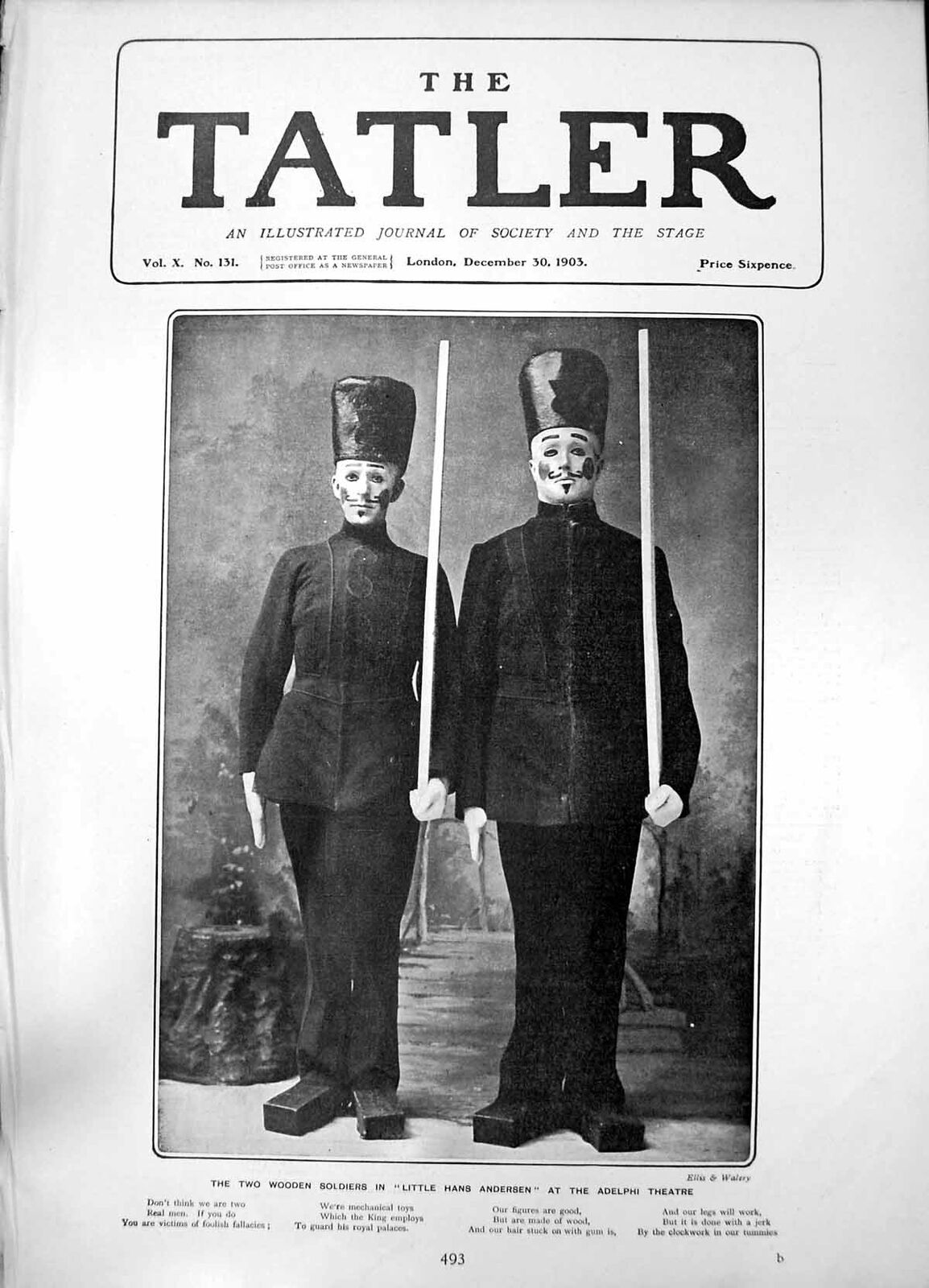
The Two Wooden Soldiers in Little Hans Andersen (1903): Ernest Torrence (left) and Crompton

With many of the former Savoy company Crompton transferred to the Adelphi Theatre where he was Mr. Hazell in The Earl and the Girl and the Royal Footman and Wooden Soldier in Little Hans Andersen (December 1903) before appearing in The Talk of the Town at the Lyric Theatre (1905); Blue Bell at the Aldwych Theatre (1905–06); Tom Jones at the Apollo Theatre (1907); Where Children Rule at the Garrick Theatre (1909); and The Spring Maid at the Whitney Theatre (1911). It would appear that in between his theatre work Crompton would return to his legal profession, as the 1911 Census lists him as a solicitor boarding with a family in Hammersmith, London. By 1913 he had returned to the stage, appearing as Sergeant Tozer in The Girl on the Film at the Gaiety Theatre (1913); in Véronique at the Adelphi Theatre (1915), and in the pantomimes Puss in Boots (1915–16) and Puss in New Boots (1916–17) at the Theatre Royal, Drury Lane.

He wrote the screenplays for the silent films Nipper's Busy Holiday (1915) and Nipper and the Curate (1916) which were vehicles for Lupino Lane. Crompton also directed Nipper's Busy Holiday (1915).

According to the 1939 Register for Exeter, by that year Crompton was divorced; his occupation is listed as a retired solicitor and actor.

Crompton died, aged 75, in September 1945 at Exeter. In his will he left an estate valued at £8,969 14s.
