= Powis Pinder =

British opera singer (1872–1941)

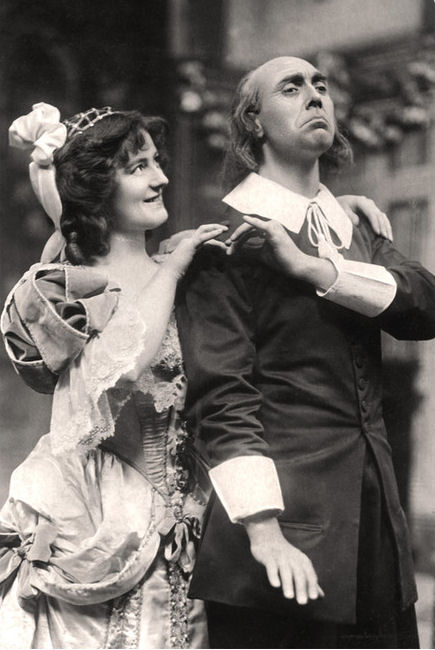
Louie Pounds and Powis Pinder in Lady Tatters (1907)

Powis Pinder (6 September 1872 – 25 July 1941) was an operatic baritone who created a number of minor roles in the Savoy Operas and played a range of more important parts in Gilbert and Sullivan operas and other works during a two decade long stage career. His later years were spent managing concert parties on the Isle of Wight where he later served as a volunteer fireman on the outbreak of World War II.

== Early life and career ==
Henry Powis Pinder was born in Camberwell, London, in 1872, the son of Naomi Maria née Devall (1839–1906) and Edward Pinder (1815–1888), a physician. His first known theatrical appearance was in an 1893 tour as the Vicomte de Champletreaux in Mam'zelle Nitouche opposite Violet Melnotte and her husband Frank Wyatt, and his début in London was at the Savoy Theatre from December 1894 to March 1895 when he created the small role of Escatero in The Chieftain with the D'Oyly Carte Opera Company before continuing in the role for a short tour of the London suburbs. From March to November 1896 he appeared with a D'Oyly Carte touring company as the Herald in The Grand Duke and in the larger role of Mr. Goldbury in Utopia, Limited. Soon afterwards, he toured as Archie FitzRaymond in A Village Venus.

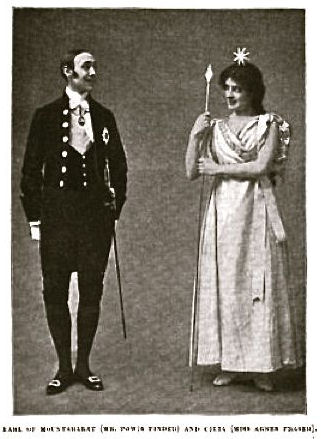
As Mountararat with Agnes Fraser as Celia in Iolanthe (1901)

Pinder rejoined a D'Oyly Carte touring company from April 1897 to December 1898 in Gilbert and Sullivan repertory as Counsel for the Plaintiff in Trial by Jury, Colonel Calverley in Patience, Strephon and Mountararat in Iolanthe, Arac in Princess Ida, the title role in The Mikado, First Yeoman and the Lieutenant of the Tower in The Yeomen of the Guard, Antonio, Luiz and Giuseppe in The Gondoliers, Captain Corcoran in Utopia, Limited and Count Cosmo in His Majesty. He married the former D'Oyly Carte singer Ethel Florence Quarry (1878–1963) in London in 1897. Their children were Elizabeth Ruth Pinder (1908–1983) and Arthur Powis Pinder (1910–1984).

== Savoy Theatre and peak years ==
Pinder was called to the main D'Oyly Carte company at the Savoy Theatre in June 1899, where he would remain continuously until 1903. He first played Bob Beckett in the revival of H.M.S. Pinafore and substituted as Dick Deadeye in September 1899 during the absence of Richard Temple. Pinder created the small role of the Soldier of the Guard in the original production of The Rose of Persia (1899–1900) before being relegated to the chorus and acting as understudy in revivals of The Pirates of Penzance (1900) and Patience (1900–1901), singing the Pirate King in August 1900 while playing the Captain in the Pirates companion piece The Outpost (1900).

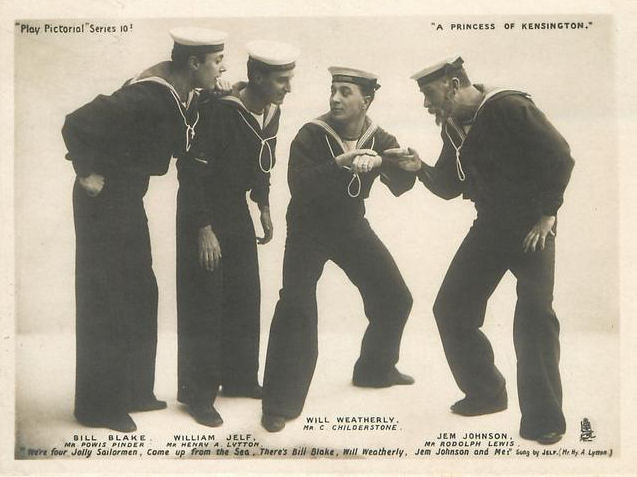
As Bill Blake (left) in A Princess of Kensington (1903) with Henry Lytton, Charles Childerstone and Rudolph Lewis

Pinder created the minor role of Private Perry in The Emerald Isle at the Savoy in April 1901, later taking over as the Earl of Newtown. He played John in Ib and Little Christina and created the role of Hi-Ho in The Willow Pattern in November 1901. From December 1901 to March 1902 he continued to play Hi-Ho in The Willow Pattern as a curtain-raiser to Iolanthe, in which he played Mountararat. In April 1902 he created the small role of the Butcher in Merrie England, while in December 1902 he appeared in a benefit performance of Cox and Box opposite Richard Temple in aid of William Rignold. In January 1903 he created another small part, the sailor Bill Blake in A Princess of Kensington, continuing with the role on tour in May 1903.

When the tour ended he left the Savoy to appear as Dudley Cranbourne in The Earl and the Girl (December 1903) at the Adelphi Theatre and after at the Lyric Theatre. At the same time he appeared in 23 matinee performances of Little Hans Andersen at the Adelphi. In 1905 Pinder toured in The Golden Girl opposite Louie Pounds and was in the Seymour Hicks musical The Talk of the Town at the Lyric (1905); he appeared in the chorus of a benefit matinee performance of Trial by Jury for Ellen Terry at the Theatre Royal, Drury Lane in 1906.

Pinder went on to appear in The Vicar of Wakefield at the Prince of Wales's Theatre (1906–07) and as Matthew Scraby in Lady Tatters opposite Marie George and Courtice Pounds at the Shaftesbury Theatre (1907). During 1908 to 1909 Pinder appeared opposite his wife Ethel Quarry and Walter Passmore in a tour of Merrie England for William Greet in the pantomime Little Boy Bluebeard at the Royal Court Theatre (1910–11), and in a musical version of Alice in Wonderland at the Comedy Theatre (1913–14). In 1915 He performed in the one-act comedy Jerry and the Sunbeam at the Town Hall in Shanklin on the Isle of Wight in a benefit for the St John Ambulance Association. In 1916 he was touring in the comic opera The Idol of Kano.

== Later life ==
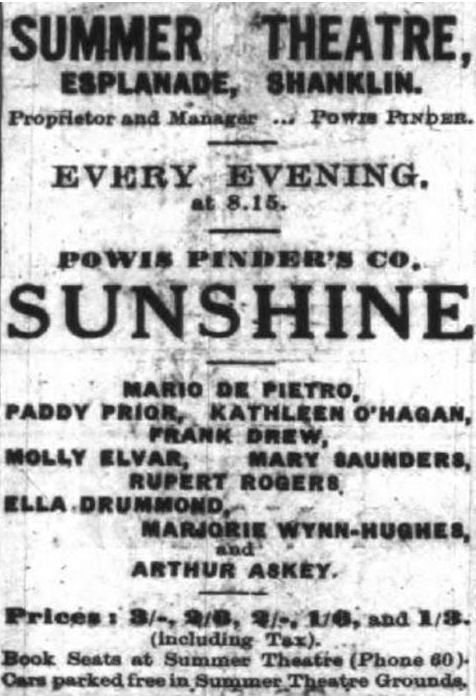
Advert for Pinder's Summer Theatre at Shanklin (1918) with Arthur Askey in the cast

Pinder seems to have decided to stay in Shanklin with his family, as from 1918 he staged burlesque evenings at the Town Hall and the Shanklin Pier Theatre, arranging free tickets for military personnel wounded in World War I who were being treated in local military hospitals. In October 1919 Pinder became a Freemason when he joined the local Chine Lodge. In 1919 the wooden stage and tented pavilion used by Pinder was destroyed in a fire, and so he acquired a seaplane hangar from Bembridge, which he set up on the Esplanade at Shanklin, fitting out the interior as a concert pavilion with a platform stage and proscenium. Named the Sunshine Theatre, it operated from 1921 to 1939, and here Pinder's company annually performed Sunshine Concert Parties which in the early to mid-1930s included Webster Booth and Arthur Askey among the cast.

In 1939 he was living with his wife and daughter Elizabeth, a theatrical dress designer, at Bay Tree Cottage at Shanklin, where he and his wife were still managing the theatre. His son Arthur had been helping his parents manage the Sunshine Theatre, but when he left to join the Army on the outbreak of World War II the theatre closed and was requisitioned as storage for Operation Pluto (Pipe Line Under The Ocean). Shortly after the outbreak of the war Pinder joined the local Auxiliary Fire Service as a volunteer, aged 67, eventually being promoted to Leading Fireman.

Pinder died in the Maycroft Nursing Home at Shanklin in July 1941, aged 68. His fire brigade funeral was held at the church of St Blasius and was attended by friends from his London theatre days in addition to local people and dignitaries. His coffin was carried by local firemen while representatives from the fire brigade and A.F.S. units at Ventnor and Sandown also attended. In his will he left £2,970 3s 4d to his widow.
