= St Blasius Church, Shanklin =

Church on the Isle of Wight, England

St. Blasius Church, Shanklin
- St. Blasius Church, Shanklin
- 50°37′18″N 01°11′02″W
- Denomination: Church of England
- Churchmanship: Broad Church
- Website: st-blasius-church.org.uk

History
- Dedication: St. Blasius

Administration
- Province: Canterbury
- Diocese: Portsmouth
- Parish: Shanklin

St. Blasius Church, Shanklin is a parish church in the Church of England located in Shanklin, Isle of Wight.

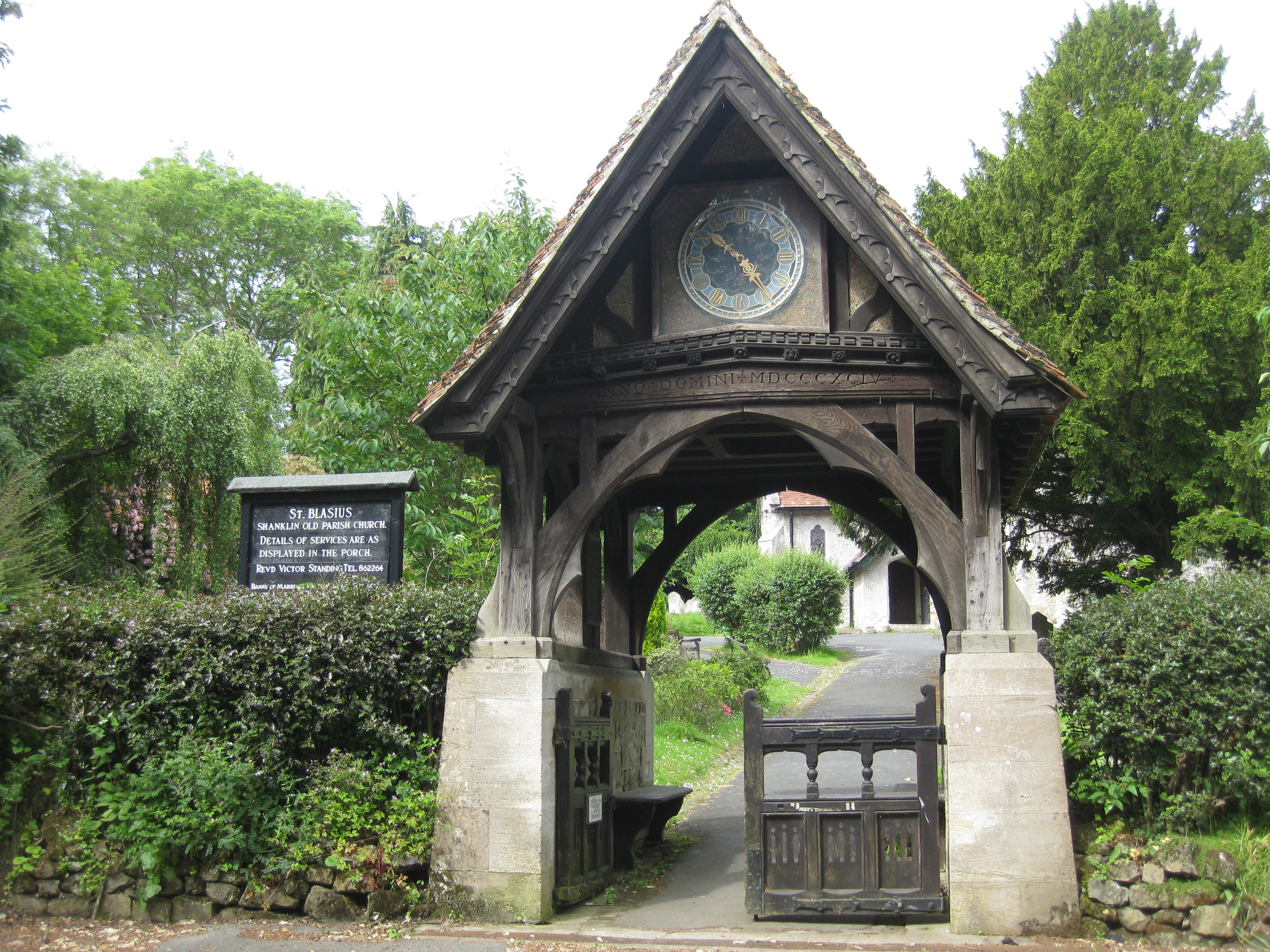
Lych Gate at Shanklin Old Church

The church is medieval but was largely rebuilt in 1859. It is also known as Shanklin Old Church. The bell ropes hang down into the nave, so the ringers can be seen by the congregation.

It stands at the southern end of the parish at the angle made by the roads to Wroxall and Ventnor. Originally it must have been of the usual aisleless type of manorial chapel—an oblong structure with nave and chancel in one line; and so it remained till 1852, when transepts were added, the church lengthened westward and a bell turret formed at the intersection of the roofs. A lych-gate with clock and bell was put up as a memorial to Mr. White-Popham. There is a good Renaissance oak chest, apparently brought from elsewhere. There are memorial tablets to members of the Hill and Popham families. The registers date from 1717.

The funeral of the actor and singer Powis Pinder was held here in 1941.

== Organ ==
The pipe organ dates from 1874 by the builder Forster and Andrews. A specification of the organ can be found on the National Pipe Organ Register.
