= William Rignold =

English actor (1836–1904)

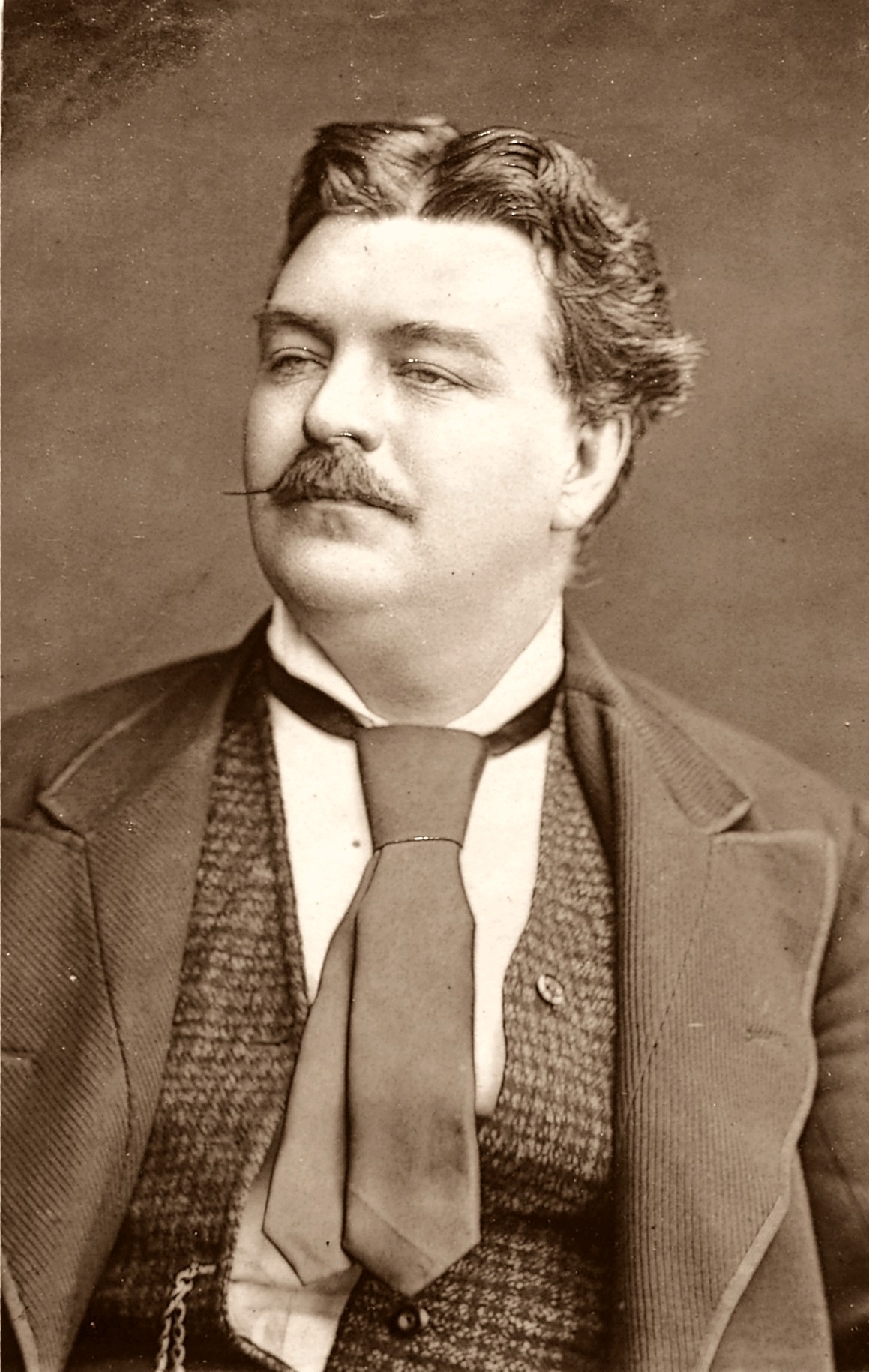
William Rignold

William Henry Rignold (8 April 1836 – 22 December 1904) was an English actor. He began acting as a teenager, together with his younger brother George. A capable musician, he also played the violin professionally in the early years of his career, before becoming a full-time actor. During his career he appeared with leading players including Samuel Phelps, Ellen Terry, Madge Kendal and his brother. Failing eyesight ended his career in 1902, and he died two years later at the age of 68.

== Life and career ==
=== Early years ===
Rignold was born in Leicester on 8 April 1836, the first son of the actor William Ross Rignold (1813–1883) and his wife, the actress Patricia Blaxland (1800–1888). A second son, George, also entered the theatrical profession.

Both the brothers were brought up as musicians, and William was a capable violinist. In 1850 he became a member of the orchestra at the Theatre Royal, Hull, and in 1855 he was répétiteur at the New Theatre, Sheffield. A year later a great change took place in his career. He was leading the orchestra in Limerick for a stage version of Rob Roy when the actor playing the villain, Rashleigh, missed his train: in his absence Rignold played the part, simultaneously managing to lead the orchestra without the subterfuge being spotted by the audience. He recalled, "The performance was such a success that all my friends persuaded me to take to the stage, so I left my much-loved violin, and in 1857 opened at the Amphitheatre, Liverpool ... as 'general utility'". (Note: The Oxford English Dictionary defines a "utility actor" as "An actor of the smallest speaking-parts in a play".)

In 1860 Rignold had a leading role in The Dead Heart at the Theatre Royal, Bristol. His brother George was also a member of the company at the Theatre Royal. In the production of A Midsummer Night's Dream with which the new Theatre Royal, Bath, opened on 4 March 1863 William played Lysander, and George played Theseus, in a cast that included Charles Coghlan (Demetrius), Henrietta Hodson (Oberon), Ellen Terry (Titania), William Robertson and his daughter Madge.

=== West End ===
Rignold made his London debut in 1869 in Marie Antoinette at the Princess's Theatre, receiving a good review from the leading theatrical paper, The Era: "Mr Rignold has a good presence, an excellent delivery, and a thorough acquaintance with the business of the stage". He followed this with successful appearances in Dion Boucicault's Presumptive Evidence, which played in a double bill with Handel's opera Acis and Galatea starring Blanche Cole.

In 1875 Rignold played Herbert in Heartsease, a free adaptation of Dumas's La Dame aux Camélias. In 1878 he played the title role in Shakespeare's Henry VIII to the Wolsey of the revered veteran Samuel Phelps. One of the most conspicuous successes of Rignold's career was made at the Princess's in June 1879 in Charles Reade's dramatisation of Émile Zola's L' Assomoir, entitled Drink. The French critic Francisque Sarcey, who visited London in May of that year, was much impressed by "the simple truth" of Rignold's acting in this character: "He has a 'good-bye' that brings tears into the eyes".

In London Rignold played many characters, including Clement Huntingford in The World, and Macbeth (to the Lady Macbeth of Adelaide Ristori) at Drury Lane; Surgeon Fielding in Held by the Enemy; and Jack Saxton in Nowadays at the Princess's. He played Sir George Wilson in Robert Buchanan's Joseph's Sweetheart in 1888.

=== America and Australia ===
Rignold played Michael Strogoff in an adaptation of Jules Verne's novel The Courier of the Czar, with success in America; and in 1890–91 he played a season at his brother George's theatre, Her Majesty's, Sydney, during which the critic Austin Brereton listed his roles as including "the bluff, honest Jack Saxton in Nowadays; Old Toni in After Dark; Lesurques and Dubose in The Courier of Lyons, Noah Learoyd and Lawyer Moneypenny in The Long Strike; Jacques in The Two Orphans and Falstaff in The Merry Wives of Windsor". George played Ford to William's Falstaff, and William's daughter Bessie also appeared with him during the season.

After his American and Australian tour Rignold acted in a London revival of W. S. Gilbert's Dan'l Druce, Blacksmith (1894) playing Sir Jasper; Santa Claus at the Lyceum (1894–95); Augustus Harris's Cheer, Boys, Cheer at Drury Lane in 1895 (in a cast in which his cousin Lionel Rignold also appeared); and in True Blue at the Olympic (1896).

At the end of the century, Rignold's eyesight failed, leaving him unable to perform. He retired and a benefit fund was set up; a fund-raising show was given in 1902 under the auspices of Sir Henry Irving at the Lyric Theatre. Richard Temple, Vernon Cave and Powis Pinder performed Cox and Box, George Rignold gave a speech from Henry V, Sheridan's The Critic was given by a cast led by H. B. Irving and Constance Collier, and Trial by Jury was played by Rutland Barrington, Charles Childerstone, Hayden Coffin, George Grossmith, Jr., Evie Greene, Lionel Monckton and others.

Rignold died at his home in north London on 22 December 1904.

== Notes, references and sources ==
=== Sources ===
- Mullin, Donald C (1987). Victorian Plays: A Record of Significant Productions on the London Stage, 1837–1901. New York: Greenwood Press. OCLC 1151676432.
- Pemberton, T. Edgar (1900). The Kendals: A Biography. London: C. A. Pearson. OCLC 1047496797.
- Wearing, J. P. (1976). The London Stage 1890–1899: A Calendar of Plays and Players. Lanham: Scarecrow Press. ISBN 0810809109.
