= A Princess of Kensington =

Walter Passmore (l) and Henry Lytton in A Princess of Kensington

A Princess of Kensington is an English comic opera in two acts by Edward German to a libretto by Basil Hood, produced by William Greet. The first performance was at the Savoy Theatre, London, on 22 January 1903 and ran for 115 performances.

The opera was the last new work performed by the members of the D'Oyly Carte Opera Company at the Savoy Theatre, and is therefore considered by some to be the last Savoy opera. The original cast included a number of the famous Savoyards, including Louie Pounds, Robert Evett, Walter Passmore, Henry Lytton, and Rosina Brandram. After the original run at the Savoy, the show toured. After that tour, the cast mostly joined the new musical, The Earl and the Girl (also produced by Greet).

The piece was given a Broadway production from August to October 1903.

== Background ==
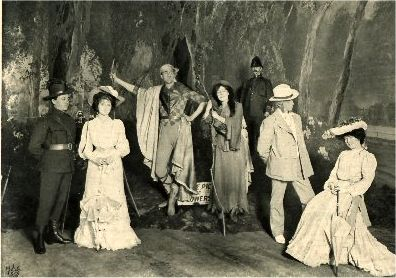
Postcard, 1903

Following the successes of their earlier comic operas, The Emerald Isle and Merrie England, Basil Hood and Edward German collaborated once more on A Princess of Kensington. Despite a good reception from critics and Savoy opera devotees, the opera achieved a run of only 115 performances, owing partly to its dense plot and unwieldy libretto, and partly to the continued decline of comic operas in favour of George Edwardes-style musical comedies as the London theatregoing public's choice entertainment.

Despite its relative failure compared to the other Savoy operas, A Princess of Kensington became popular enough to be one of the first operas to have original cast recordings of selections made during the original run. The recordings themselves were popular enough that a 1907 silent film of one of the songs, "Four Jolly Sailor Boys" [sic], was produced to be played synchronized to the recording.

The fairy backstory of the plot is derived from a poem by Thomas Tickell entitled Kensington Garden, featuring the history of the characters Albion, Azuriel, Kenna, and Oberon.

== Roles and original cast ==
Brandram as Nell Reddish

- Sir James Jellicoe, a Rich Banker (father of Joy Jellicoe) – Arthur Boielle
- Brook Green, his Junior Clerk (tenor) – Robert Evett
- Puck, the Imp of Mischief (comic baritone) – Walter Passmore
- William Jelf, a Sailor from H.M.S. "Albion" (baritone) – Henry Lytton
- Bill Blake, Will Weatherly, and Jem Johnson, Sailors from H.M.S. "Albion" (baritones) – Powis Pinder, Charles Childerstone and Rudolph Lewis
- Yapp, a Policeman (bass) – M. R. Morand
- Mr. Reddish, Proprietor of "The Jolly Tar," Winklemouth (bass-baritone) – Reginald Crompton
- Old Ben and James Doubleday, Fishermen – George Mudie, Jr. and Edwin Bryan
- Recruiting Sergeant, Royal Marines (baritone) – Percival Stevens
- Oberon, King of Fairies (high baritone) – Alec Fraser
- Azuriel, a Mountain Spirit (bass) – Ernest Torrence
- Recruiting Sergeant – F. Percival Stevens
- Joy, Sir James Jellicoe’s Daughter (mezzo-soprano) – Louie Pounds
- Nell Reddish, Mr. Reddish’s Niece (contralto) – Rosina Brandram
- Titania, Queen of Fairies (soprano) – Olive Rae
- Butterfly (mezzo-soprano) – Winifred Hart-Dyke
- Moth (mezzo-soprano) – Maude Thornton
- Cobweb (soprano) – Nancy Pounds
- Dragonfly – Lily Bircham
- Peaseblossom (soprano) – Constance Drever
- Lady Jellicoe, Wife of Sir James (contralto) – Cora Lingard
- Kenna, Oberon’s Daughter (coloratura soprano) – Agnes Fraser
- Chorus of Fairies, Fishermen and Fishergirls, Red Marines, etc.

== Synopsis ==
Postcard advertising A Princess of Kensington with Robert Evett as Lt. Green and Louie Pounds as Joy

- Act I – Kensington Gardens – Morning
- Act II – Winklemouth-on-Sea – Afternoon

The fairy prince, Azuriel, has been suffering from jealousy for a thousand years over the love shared by the lovely fairy Kenna (for whom Kensington is named) and the mortal Prince Albion. Although Albion is dead, the mischievous Puck has encouraged Azuriel's jealousy through the centuries. Puck, lying, claims that he taught Kenna a spell to awaken Albion after a thousand years. Azuriel's jealousy is inflamed at the thought that his rival might soon reawaken, and he demands that Albion be promptly married off to a mortal maiden.

To calm the angry fairy prince, Puck and Kenna have to produce a false Albion and a false wedding. For their false Albion they choose a sailor, William Jelf, from the H.M.S. Albion. Jelf's cap conveniently bears the name "Albion". To provide a bride, Puck sees an opportunity in the appearance of two young lovers, Lieutenant Brook Green and Joy Jellicoe. Puck disguises himself as Sir James Jellicoe, Joy's father. He revokes Sir James's acceptance of Lt. Green as a husband for his daughter and encourages Jelf to woo the astonished Joy.

An alehouse owner, Mr. Reddish, arrives with his daughter Nell, to whom Jelf is actually engaged. Reddish is anxious to get Nell off his hands as she is a prohibitionist reformer and has turned his pub into a coffee house, to the disgust of Mr. Reddish's cronies, one of whom happens to be Jelf's uncle. Reddish hopes to marry Nell to Jelf, if necessary by force. Reddish and Nell are unhappy with the state of affairs that they encounter.

After additional complications, Azuriel is finally convinced that Albion is really dead, and the fairies can return to fairyland, where peace is restored. Joy can marry her lieutenant, and Nell decides to marry Jelf's uncle, her father's friend, who she believes deeply needs the benefits of her reforms. William Jelf goes back to sea, a highly relieved bachelor.

== Musical numbers ==
Act I

1. Solo – Peaseblossom. "Come, Fairies!" and Female Chorus "'Tis Midsummer Day"
2. Chorus – "From where the Scotch mountains"
3. Duet – Oberon and Titania. "Mortal King may ride a-horseback"
4. Song and Chorus – Puck. "If we pass beyond the portals"
5. Duet – Brook and Joy. "Seven o'clock in the morning"
6. Sextet – Joy, Kenna, Lady Jellicoe, Brook, Puck, and Azuriel. "Who that knows how I love you, love"
7. Quartette – Jelf, Weatherly, Johnson, and Blake. "We're four jolly sailormen"
8. Song – Nell. "Oh, what is woman's duty?"
9. Chorus – "We're butchers and bakers and candlestick makers"
10. Tarantelle – Butterfly.
11. Song – Kenna. "Twin butterflies"
12. Song – Brook and Chorus. "Now, here's to the 'Prentices"
13. Song – Jelf. "A sailor man's the sort of man"
14. Trio – Joy, Brook, and Puck. "If love in a cottage be all that they tell"
15. Act I Finale (including Song – Jelf. "A bachelor of navel cut")

Act II

1. Chorus. "High and dry"
2. Song – Kenna. "A Mountain stood like a grim outpost"
3. Song – Puck. "By a Piccadilly cab-stand"
4. Trio – Kenna, Puck, and Jelf, with Chorus. "If you will spare the time"
5. Bridal Chorus and Duet (Azuriel and Kenna). "See a rainbow arch... Ye silver chimes of fall and fountain"
6. Song – Brook. "A blue sky and a blue sea" (this song was replaced during the original run, with the song "Where haven lies")
7. Trio – Nell, Puck, and Jelf. "A German Prince May wed me"
8. Song – Joy. "He was a simple sailor man"
9. Trio and Chorus – Sergeant, Puck and Yapp. "It's a pressing invitation that I bring"
10. Song – Puck and Butterfly. "Oh, if I were a barn-door owl"
11. Act II Finale. "Seven o'clock in the evening"
