= The Rose of Persia =

Comic opera by Arthur Sullivan and Basil Hood

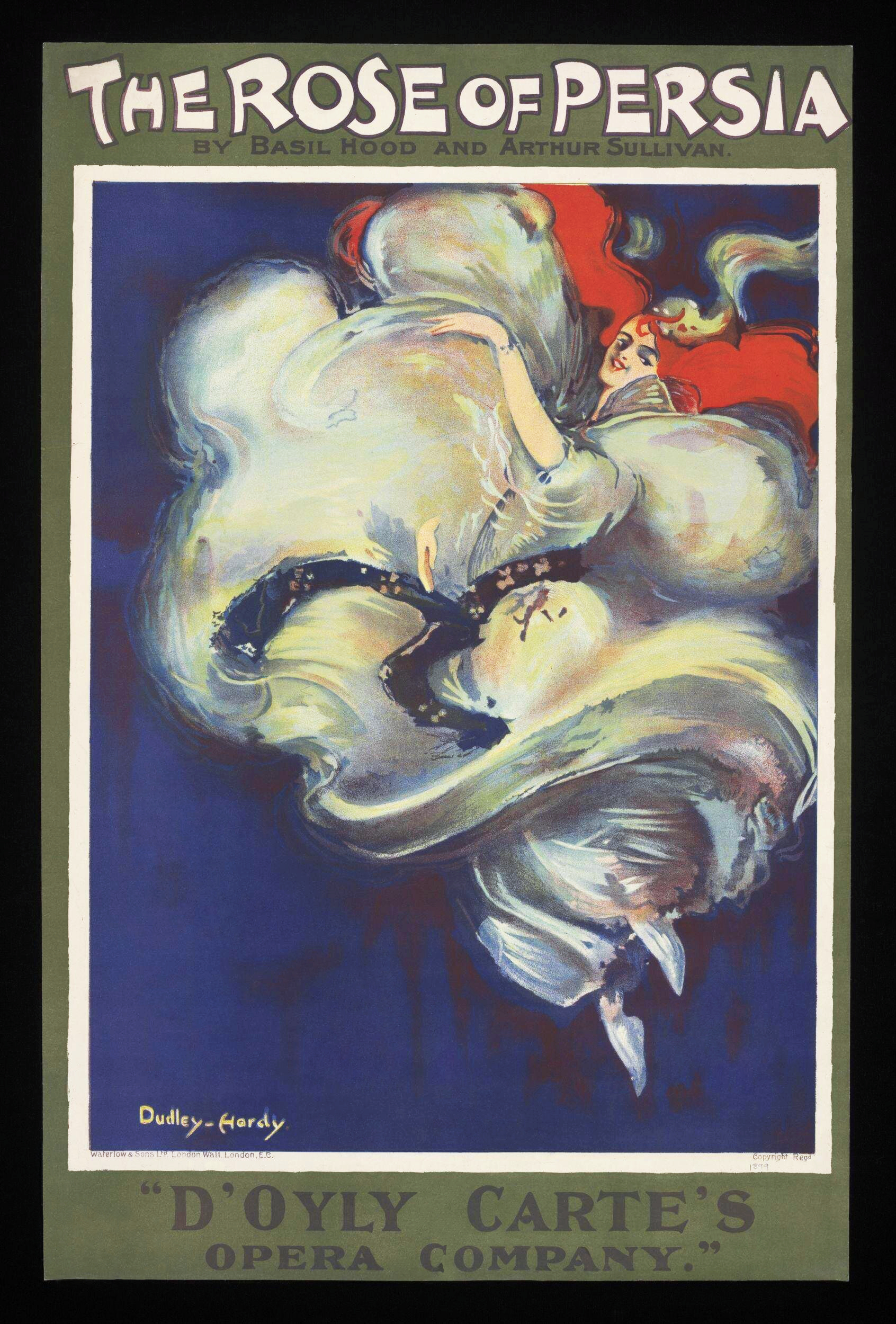
Poster by Dudley Hardy

The Rose of Persia; or, The Story-Teller and the Slave, is a two-act comic opera, with music by Arthur Sullivan and a libretto by Basil Hood. It premiered at the Savoy Theatre on 29 November 1899, closing on 28 June 1900 after a profitable run of 211 performances. The opera then toured, had a brief run in America and played elsewhere throughout the English-speaking world.

The original cast included Savoy Theatre regulars Ellen Beach Yaw, Rosina Brandram, Emmie Owen, Louie Pounds, Isabel Jay, Walter Passmore, Henry Lytton and Robert Evett. Later, Decima Moore joined the cast as Scent-of-Lillies.

The opera was regularly revived by amateur theatre groups, particularly in Britain, through the 1950s, but it has been produced only sporadically since then. The New York Gilbert and Sullivan Players produced the opera professionally in 2007 at New York City Center.

== Background and original production ==
When the Gilbert and Sullivan partnership collapsed after the production of The Gondoliers in 1889, impresario Richard D'Oyly Carte struggled to find successful new works for the Savoy Theatre. He was able to bring Gilbert and Sullivan together briefly for two more operas (Utopia, Limited and The Grand Duke), neither of which was a great success. He also paired Sullivan with several other librettists, but none of the resulting operas were particularly successful. Carte's other new pieces for the Savoy in the 1890s had done no better. In Basil Hood, Sullivan finally found a congenial new collaborator, giving the Savoy its first significant success since the early 1890s. Sullivan and Hood worked together on the new piece, originally entitled Hassan, over the summer of 1899. Unlike W. S. Gilbert, Hood did not direct his own works, and the Savoy's stage manager, Richard Barker, acted as stage director. Costumes were designed by Percy Anderson.

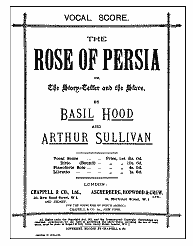
Cover of the vocal score

The casting of the soprano to play the leading role of the Sultana Zubedyah was problematic. Sullivan had been much impressed by the American high soprano Ellen Beach Yaw, and he prevailed upon the D'Oyly Carte Opera Company to cast her in the role. Leading soprano Ruth Vincent quit the company when she was passed over for the role (although she later played the Sultana in New York). Sullivan wrote a special high cadenza for one of Yaw's songs, "'Neath My Lattice", to show off her extraordinary range. Yaw's first two nights were shaky, though the reviews were mixed, and both the music director, Francois Cellier, and Mrs. Carte advocated her replacement. Sullivan at first agreed, though writing in his diary on 2 December 1899, "I don't quite see what it's all about – Miss Yaw is not keeping people out of the theatre as Cellier and the Cartes imply." By 10 December, however, he wrote in his diary that Yaw was "improving rapidly" and "sang the song really superbly: brilliant. So I wrote again to Mrs. Carte saying that I thought if we let Miss Yaw go it would be another mistake." It was too late, however, and the next day Yaw was dismissed summarily by Mrs. Carte (ostensibly on account of illness). Isabel Jay was promoted to play the part.

The first performance, on 29 November 1899, was a reassuring success – the first that the Savoy had enjoyed since Utopia Limited six years earlier. The piece played for a total of 211 performances, closing on 28 June 1900, and D'Oyly Carte touring companies soon were performing The Rose of Persia around the British provinces and then throughout the English-speaking world. In New York, it opened at Daly's Theatre on 6 September 1900, closing on 29 September 1900 after 25 performances. Ruth Vincent played the Sultana, Hassan was John Le Hay, the Sultan was Charles Angelo, and Yussuf was Sidney Bracy. After Rose proved to be a hit, Sullivan and Hood teamed up again, but the composer died, leaving their second collaboration, The Emerald Isle, unfinished until the score was completed by Edward German.

Rose is firmly reminiscent of the style of the earlier Savoy successes, with its topsy-turvy plot, mistaken identities, the constant threat of executions, an overbearing wife, and a fearsome monarch who is fond of practical joking. Although critics found Hood inferior to Gilbert, his delight in comic word-play at times resembles the work of his great predecessor. With its episodic plot, its exotic setting, and its emphasis on dance numbers, Rose also takes a step towards musical comedy, which by 1899 was the dominant genre on the London stage.

When Sullivan died, his autograph scores passed to his nephew, Herbert Sullivan, and then to Herbert's widow. After her death, the collection was broken up and sold by auction at Sotheby's in London on 13 June 1966. Some items were sold for considerable sums (the score of Trial by Jury sold for £9,000), but the manuscript of The Rose of Persia sold for a mere £90, passing to a collector. Upon the death of this collector, almost forty years later, the manuscript was bequeathed to Oriel College, Oxford, and in December 2005 scholars from the Sir Arthur Sullivan Society were able to examine the manuscript, along with other Sullivan autograph manuscripts. They discovered, at the back of The Rose of Persia, an item that had been cut from the show before the premiere, which was not even known to exist.

== Roles and original cast ==
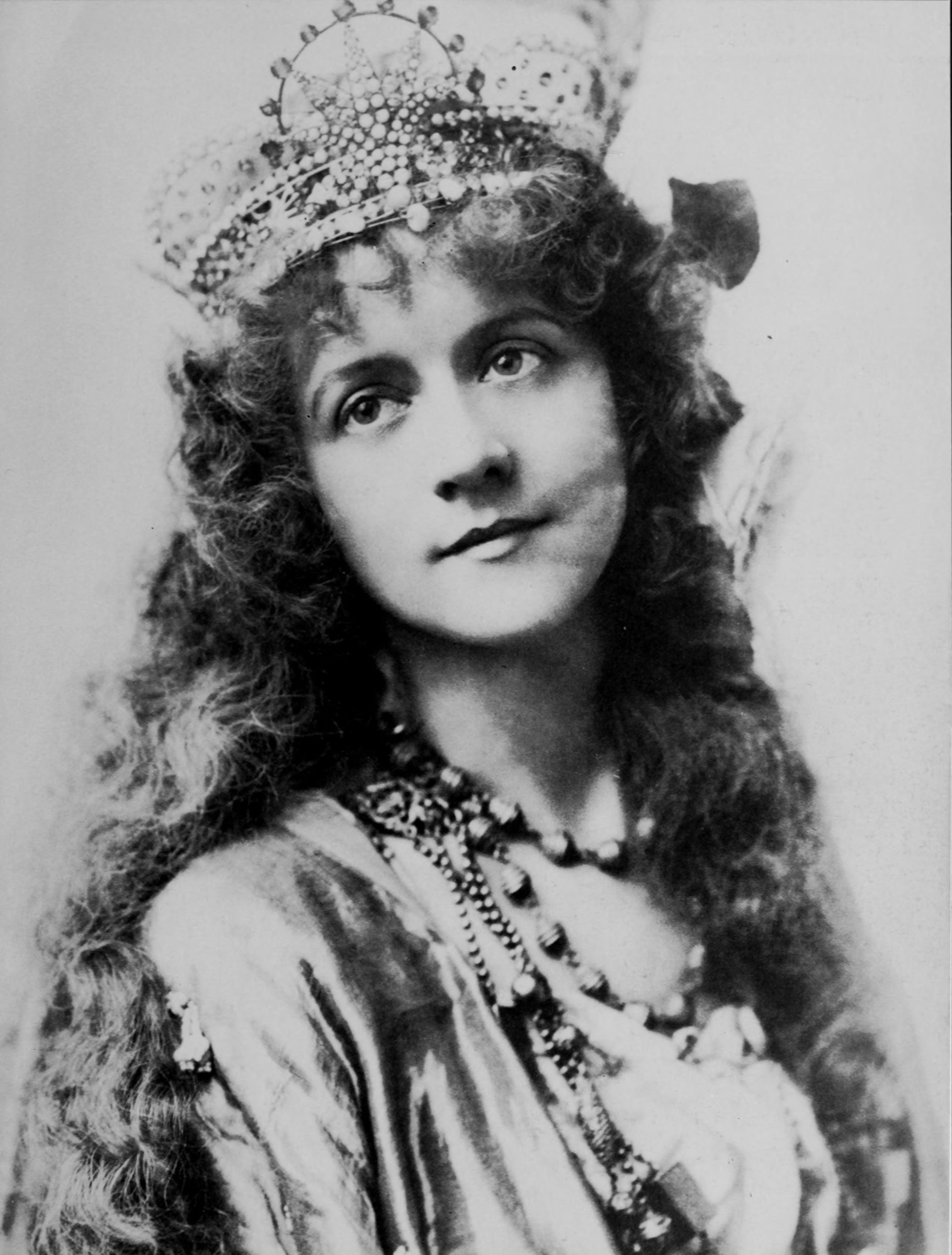
Yaw as the Sultana

- The Sultan Mahmoud of Persia (lyric baritone) – Henry Lytton
- Hassan (a philanthropist) (comic baritone) – Walter Passmore
- Yussuf (a professional story-teller) (tenor) – Robert Evett
- Abdallah (a priest) (bass-baritone) – George Ridgwell
- The Grand Vizier (baritone) – W. H. Leon
- The Physician-in-Chief (tenor) – Charles Childerstone
- The Royal Executioner (baritone) – Reginald Crompton
- Soldier of the Guard (bass) – Powis Pinder
- The Sultana Zubeydeh (named "Rose-in-Bloom") (coloratura soprano) – Ellen Beach Yaw, replaced by Isabel Jay
- The Sultana's favourite slaves:

"Scent-of-Lilies" (soprano) – Jessie Rose
"Heart's Desire" (mezzo-soprano) – Louie Pounds
"Honey-of-Life" (soprano) – Emmie Owen

- "Dancing Sunbeam" (Hassan's first wife) (contralto) – Rosina Brandram
- "Blush-of-Morning" (his twenty-fifth wife) (soprano) – Isabel Jay, replaced by Agnes Fraser
- Wives of Hassan:

"Oasis-in-the-Desert" – Madge Moyse
"Moon-Upon-the-Waters" – Jessie Pounds
"Song-of-Nightingales" – Rose Rosslyn
"Whisper-of-the-West-Wind" – Gertrude Gerrard

- Chorus (Act I) — Hassan's Wives, Mendicants and Sultan's Guards
- Chorus (Act II) — Royal Slave Girls, Palace Officials and Guards

== Synopsis ==
=== Act I ===
Scene: Court of Hassan's House.

The wealthy merchant Hassan is contented with his peaceful life in Persia. He is surrounded by his twenty-five wives (he has carelessly miscounted and dismisses his 26th wife, as he has decided that 25 is his limit!), including his first wife, Dancing Sunbeam, who wishes that the family would mingle more with high society. Hassan is known for generously entertaining travellers and the poor in his home. Abdallah, the High Priest, arrives. Abdallah accuses Hassan of madness, because he consorts with beggars and other riff-raff, which he says does not follow Islam. He threatens to drive the evil spirit out of Hassan by force. As evidence of his sanity, Hassan offers to make out his will in Abdallah's favour. Abdallah agrees that anyone who would do this must be sane. Dancing Sunbeam plans to share Hassan's fortune with Abdallah should Hassan perish.

Yussuf, a traveling story-teller, arrives, shortly followed by four of the Sultana's slaves, who have slipped out of the palace disguised as dancing girls to explore the outside world. One of the girls, Heart's Desire, quickly falls in love with Yussuf. Another is actually Rose-in-Bloom, the Sultana. They know that they will surely be executed if the Sultan learns of their absence. Yussuf says that he will ensure that they return home safely. Hassan invites Yussuf, the girls, and a crowd of beggars and cripples into his home, offering them supper. Yussuf sings them a drinking song, and the "dancing girls" also perform for them. Abdallah enters with two police officers to arrest the unruly group. Hassan helps the beggars escape while Abdallah reads the warrant.

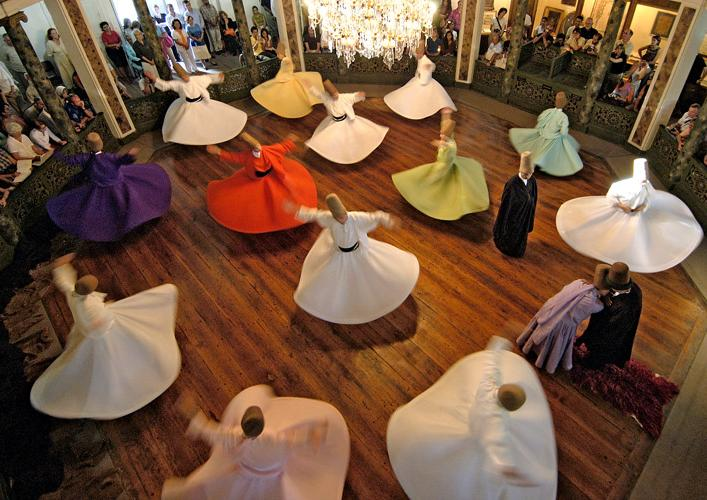
Whirling dervishes

Abdallah orders the dancing girls arrested. Heart's Desire, who is wearing the Sultana's ring, steps forward and claims that she is the Sultana. By doing so, she hopes to provide Rose-in-Bloom (the real Sultana) with an alibi. Abdallah, thinking he has found the Sultana consorting with another man, is delighted, as he is sure the Sultan will order Hassan's execution. Abdallah expects that he will inherit Hassan's wealth under the will. Dancing Sunbeam realises that Abdallah has double-crossed her and that she will not share any of Hassan's estate after all.

After Abdallah leaves, Hassan distributes a narcotic drug called "bhang", which he says will relieve the distress of their impending execution. Rose-in-Bloom giddily tells Hassan that she is the real Sultana. Hassan, anticipating his execution, takes a triple dose of "bhang". Heart's Desire announces that the Sultan himself is about to arrive, along with his Grand Vizier, Physician-in-Chief and Royal Executioner, all disguised as a religious order of dancing dervishes. The Sultan has decided to investigate for himself the rumours of Hassan's mad behaviour.

Intoxicated with "bhang", Hassan tells them that he doesn't care about the Sultan or his Executioner. The Physician realises that Hassan has overdosed on "bhang". He says the effect of the drug is that Hassan will gradually consider himself a person of more and more importance, until he suddenly falls unconscious for ten hours. Hassan starts behaving exactly as the Physician had described, claiming that he actually is the Sultan. As evidence of this, he tells them that he will introduce the Sultana. The actual Sultan is incensed that anyone would imitate his Sultana and says that the perpetrator will be punished. In the meantime, he decides to play a trick on Hassan and tells the Vizier to conduct Hassan to the palace and treat him as if he were the Sultan. They tell Hassan's wives that Hassan has been leading a double-life and is really the Sultan disguised. Hassan, believing that he is the Sultan, orders Rose-in-Bloom to lift her veil, so all may see that she is the Sultana, and threatens her with execution should she refuse. Fortunately, he collapses from the drug's effects before she does so. The Sultan orders him taken to the palace.

=== Act II ===
Scene: Audience Hall of the Sultan's Palace, the next morning.

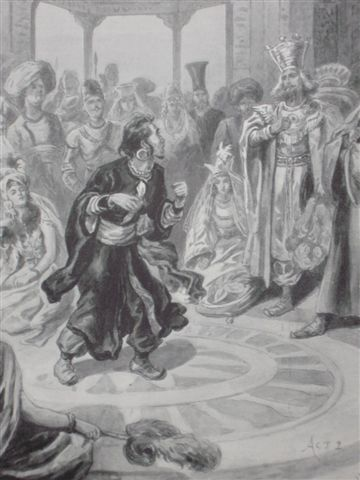
Hassan to the Sultan: "It's the odd trick, O King, that wins the game".

Yussuf sneaks into the Sultan's palace and tells Heart's Desire that he intends to ask the Sultan for her hand and will explain how they had met. She notes that the truth is likely to get them all executed and suggests that he make up a story instead. The Sultan enters, telling the members of his Court that they are to treat Hassan as if he were the Sultan. The Sultan is amused by Hassan's behaviour, as no one has ever treated him so disrespectfully. He also reasons that it might be convenient to have a fake Sultan available, as he wants to take a holiday.

Dancing Sunbeam arrives. She has heard that Hassan is now the Sultan, and therefore she announces that she is now the Sultana and looks forward to her new social rank. The Sultan plays along, and he summons the real Sultana, Rose-in-Bloom, so that he can let her in on the joke. Rose-in-Bloom, however hears that a new Sultana has been installed and fears that the Sultan has discovered her excursion outside the palace. She is relieved to find that he does not know about it, but she is afraid that he will find out. She coyly asks him what he would do if, hypothetically, she were to sneak out on a lark. He replies that if she ever were to do such a thing, she would be executed.

Hassan is brought in, still unconscious. When he wakes up, he is confused to find that he is being treated like a king and appalled to find that he now has 671 wives. Yussef arrives to ask the Sultan for Heart's Desire's hand in marriage, but he becomes flustered. Abdallah arrives to accuse the Sultana of consorting with Hassan. When the Sultan hears this, he calls an end to the practical joke and orders Hassan executed. He further decrees that he will divorce Rose-in-Bloom and will force her to marry Yussuf, a mere story-teller. Yussuf and Heart's Desire are both despondent, as they now cannot marry each other.

Dancing Sunbeam enters, still believing that she is the new Sultana. The slave girls put a veil on Dancing Sunbeam. When the Executioner enters to carry out the Sultan's order, he mistakes Dancing Sunbeam for the Sultana and causes Yussuf to be married to her. Both Dancing Sunbeam and Yussuf are unhappy at the result. Hassan is happy to be rid of the overbearing Dancing Sunbeam, although he assumes he has only a few minutes to live. The Vizier announces that the Sultan has relented and will allow the Sultana to offer an explanation. The Sultan is delighted to find that the Executioner divorced and married the wrong woman.

Heart's Desire explains that it was she who wore the Sultana's Royal Ring at Hassan's residence. Rose-in-Bloom is exonerated, but the Sultan decrees that Heart's Desire must die (for impersonating the Sultana), Abdallah must die (for making a false accusation), and Hassan remains condemned (for falsely claiming to have entertained a visit from the Sultana). Rose-in-Bloom begs the Sultan to spare her slave, as Heart's Desire has been telling her an interesting story, and she would like to hear the end of it. Hassan quickly claims to be the source of the story, and so the Sultan says he may live until he finishes telling it – as long as it has a happy ending.

The Sultan gives them a few minutes to compose themselves. Abdallah offers to help tell the story, and Hassan agrees after Abdallah returns the will, which Hassan tears up. None of them can think of an acceptable story, but when the Sultan returns, Hassan hits on an idea. He sings a song about "a small street Arab", and when it is over, he tells the Sultan that it is the story of his own life. Since the Sultan has decreed that it must have a happy ending, it follows that his execution must be cancelled. The Sultan admits that he has been outwitted, but he orders Dancing Sunbeam restored to Hassan, allowing Yussuf to marry Heart's Desire, and all ends happily.

== Musical numbers ==
Photos promoting the original production from The Sketch

- Overture (includes: "Hark, the distant roll of drums" and "Hassan, thy pity I entreat")

=== Act I ===
- 1."As We lie in langour lazy... I'm Abu'l Hassan" (Chorus of Girls [Wives], with Hassan)
- 2. "When Islam first arose" (Abdallah with Girls)
- 3. "O Life has put into my hand" (Dancing Sunbeam)
- 4. "Sunbeam, the priest keeps saying... If a sudden stroke of fate" (Blush-of-Morning, Dancing Sunbeam and Abdallah)
- 5. "If you ask me to advise you" (Rose-in-Bloom, Scent-of-Lilies and Heart's Desire)
- 6. "'Neath my lattice through the night" (Rose-in-Bloom)
- 7. "Tramps and scamps and halt and blind" (Chorus of Beggars and Girls)
- 8. "When my father sent me to Ishpahan" (Hassan with Chorus)
- 9. "Peace be upon this house... I care not if the cup I hold" (Yussuf with Chorus)
- 10. "Musical Maidens are we... Dance and Song (Ensemble, Honey-of-Life and Hassan with Chorus and Dancers)
- 11. "We have come to invade" (Abdallah with Hassan and Chorus)
- 12."The Sultan's Executioner" (Dancing Sunbeam, Rose-in-Bloom, Scent-of-Lillies, Heart's Desire, Honey-of-Life, Yussuf, Hassan, and Abdallah)
- 13. "I'm the Sultan's Vigiliant Vizier" (Sultan, Vizier, Physician and Executioner)
- 14. "Oh, luckless hour!" (Company)

=== Act II ===
- 15. "Oh, What is love?" (Heart's Desire and Yussuf)
- 16. "If you or I, should tell the truth" (Scent-of-Lilies, Honey-of-Life, Heart's Desire and Yussuf)
- 17. "From morning prayer" (Physician, Grand Vizier and Executioner with Chorus)
- 18."Let the satirist enumerate a catalogue" (Sultan with Chorus)
- 19. "In my heart of my hearts I've always known" (Dancing Sunbeam, with Blush-of-Morning, Honey-of-Life, Heart's Desire, Sultan, Vizier and Physician)
- 20. "Suppose - I say, Suppose" (Rose-in-Bloom and Sultan)
- 21 "Laughing low, on Tip-toe" (Hassan, Physician, Vizier and Executioner with Chorus)
- 22 "It's a busy, busy, busy, busy day for thee" (Scent of Lilies, Heart's Desire, Yussuf, Hassan and Executioner, with Chorus)
- 23. "Our tale is told" (Yussuf)
- 24. "What does it mean?... Joy and Sorrow Alternate" (Dancing Sunbeam, Blush-of-Morning, Yussuf and a Royal Guard)
- 25. "It has reached me a lady named Hubbard" (Scent-of-Lilies, Honey-of-Life, Heart's Desire, Dancing Sunbeam, Yussuf, Hassan and Abdallah)
- 26. "Hassan, the sultan with his court approaches" (Hassan, Physician, Executioner, Vizier, Sultan and Chorus)
- 27. "There was once a small street arab" (Hassan with Chorus)
- 28. "A bridal march" (Company)

An additional number was cut from Act II (originally Act II, No. 11), which would have fallen after Number 24 above. It is an octet, for Rose-in-Bloom, Scent-of-Lilies, Honey-of-Life, Heart's Desire, Physician, Sultan, Hassan and Executioner, with a solo verse sung by each of the first two. The first line is "Let her live a little longer!" The song reiterates everyone's desire that the Sultan spare Rose-in-Bloom's slave from execution. St David's Players assert that they presented the premiere stage performances of this number, in context, in their 2009 production of the opera. They previewed the piece in September 2009 at the Sir Arthur Sullivan Society Festival at the Royal Agricultural College, Cirencester.

== Subsequent productions and recordings ==
The only professional British revival of The Rose of Persia was at Princes Theatre in London from 28 February 1935 to 23 March 1935, closing after 25 performances. This immediately followed a successful revival of Merrie England by Hood and Edward German. The producer, R. Claude Jenkins, hoped to make the Princes the home of a series of British light opera, but the disappointing response to The Rose of Persia quashed these plans.

In recent decades, interest in performing the work has revived among amateur and professional societies. The work has been seen several times at The International Gilbert and Sullivan Festival in Buxton, England (most recently in concert in 2008), and the Festival has a video of the 2008 performance available. The New York Gilbert and Sullivan Players performed the opera at New York City Center in January 2007. The St. David's Players of Exeter in the UK performed the piece in October 2009 having previously presented it in October 1990.

The first private recording of The Rose of Persia was made in 1963 by St. Albans Amateur Operatic Society and was later released commercially on the Rare Recorded Edition label. Another recording was made in 1985 by Prince Consort and released by Pavilion Records on their Pearl label, and later reissued on CD coupled with the Prince Consort recording of The Emerald Isle. A further recording was produced for BBC Music Magazine in 1999, with the Hanover Band, and later reissued on the CPO label. Although the BBC recording is the most professionally produced, many fans prefer the interpretations in the earlier recordings.
