= Hamilton Clarke =

English conductor, composer and organist

Hamilton Clarke

James Hamilton Siree Clarke (25 January 1840 – 9 July 1912), better known as Hamilton Clarke, was an English conductor, composer and organist. Although Clarke was a prolific composer, he is best remembered as an associate of Arthur Sullivan, for whom he arranged music and compiled overtures for some of the Savoy Operas, including Gilbert and Sullivan's The Mikado.

Clarke began as an organist, pianist and theatre conductor, becoming a musical director for Gilbert and Sullivan, among others. While conducting at London theatres, he also composed a tremendous volume of church music, organ solos, songs, operettas and orchestral works. Beginning in the late 1870s, he composed incidental music as musical director for many of Henry Irving's spectacular productions at the Lyceum Theatre. He also composed music for many of the German Reed Entertainments and conducted at many other London theatres in the 1870s and 1880s. Clarke published a Manual of Orchestration and music criticism, as well as some fiction. In 1889, he took charge of the Victorian National Orchestra in Australia, returning to England in 1892 and soon becoming conductor of the Carl Rosa Opera Company for several years.

== Biography ==
Clarke was born in Birmingham, the son of an amateur organist. He began playing the piano at age four, and by six had improvised a tune that he reused in one of his mature works forty years later. He took up the violin when he was eight and played in an orchestra at twelve. In the same year, he became the organist at his church and was composing music by age 19. His parents did not approve of his taking music up as a profession, and he was sent to work first with an analytical chemist and then with a land surveyor. According to The Musical Times, he did not take up music as a profession until he was in his twenties. In 1864 he was awarded the first prize for anthems by the College of Organists.

=== Early career ===
Clarke held posts as organist in Ireland and was conductor of the Belfast Anacreontic Society. From 1866 he was organist at Queen's College, Oxford, where he also conducted the Queen's College Musical Society. After travelling for several years, he returned to London in 1871 and became the organist of Kensington Parish Church, London, and in 1872 he succeeded Arthur Sullivan as organist of St. Peter's, South Kensington. He left that post soon, however, to become a theatrical conductor.

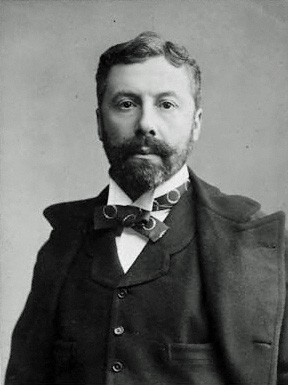
Richard D'Oyly Carte engaged Clarke as conductor in 1874

Clarke was Richard D'Oyly Carte's musical director and conductor at the Opera Comique in 1874 for The Broken Branch adapted from La Branche Cassée. Clarke interpolated into the operetta a ballet of his own composition, "Les Prètresses de l'Amour". In October 1875, Sullivan hired Clarke as a replacement musical director of Trial by Jury at the Royalty Theatre, London, when Charles Morton succeeded Carte as general manager of the opera's original production. Clarke then moved with the production to the Opera Comique in January 1876, where it ran until May. In 1876 Clarke was reported to be suffering from "a long and painful illness", and Carte organised a benefit concert for him at the Langham Hall. By December of that year, Clarke was working again, adapting the score and providing new choruses and ballet music for the first English performances of Die Fledermaus at the Alhambra Theatre. The reviewer of The Observer found Strauss's music "thin and commonplace" and thought Clarke's additional music much superior: "in remarkable contrast to that with which it is associated, being full of bright, characteristic melody, well harmonised and enriched by masterly orchestration." In 1877, Clarke participated in a very early experiment with telephony, with his organ playing being sent a distance of four miles down a wire.

Clarke performed on the piano as an accompanist at the promenade concerts at Covent Garden that year, and in 1878, encouraged by Sullivan, who was then in charge of the concerts, he conducted a major orchestral work of his own, a symphony in F major. The Times reported this concert thus:

Amateurs know that Mr Clarke is a composer of more than ordinary promise, and were, therefore, not surprised to hear a work of more than ordinary merit. The Symphony is in four movements, the first of which, allegro molto appassionato, constructed mainly upon two themes, combined and worked out with great ingenuity, fully bears out its title. The second movement, a larghetto, in the key of the subdominant, is of a more tranquil character, though diversified by episodes, and especially one, given out by the violoncellos, effectively contrasting with the leading subject. The third, molto grazioso, is a minuet, so graceful and tuneful that a more fitting designation could hardly be applied to it. It has also a most engaging alternativo equally noticeable. The finale, preceded by a kind of recitative, most effective in its place, is an allegro molto, full of vigour, instrumented for the orchestra with all varieties of combination and contrast, while preserving consistency throughout. The whole terminates effectively with a reference to the opening phrase of the allegro appassionato. The symphony was capitally played under the direction of its composer, to whom Mr Sullivan, who deserves much credit for having produced it, courteously yielded the baton.

=== Theatre work ===
Clarke conducted at ten or more London theatres, including the Lyceum Theatre, where he composed music for a number of Henry Irving's productions, including Hamlet and The Merchant of Venice. Irving's co-star, Ellen Terry, wrote in her memoir, The Story of My Life, "No one was cleverer than Hamilton Clarke, Henry's first musical director, and a most gifted composer, at carrying out [Irving's] instructions. Hamilton Clarke often grew angry and flung out of the theatre, saying that it was quite impossible to do what Mr. Irving wanted. 'Patch it together, indeed!' he used to say to me indignantly.... 'Mr. Irving knows nothing about music, or he couldn't ask me to do such a thing.' But the next day he would return with the score altered on the lines suggested by Henry, and would confess that the music was improved. 'Upon my soul, it's better! The 'Guv'nor' was perfectly right.'" He was one of the many composers recruited to write German Reed Entertainments at St. George's Hall. These included Castle Botherem: or An Irish Stew (1880), Cherry Tree Farm (1881), and Nobody's Fault (1882) to texts by Arthur Law, and Fairly Puzzled (text by Oliver Brand) in 1884 and A Pretty Bequest (text by T. Malcolm Watson) in 1885. Reviews both for Clarke's music and the performances of Corney Grain and the rest of the company were excellent.

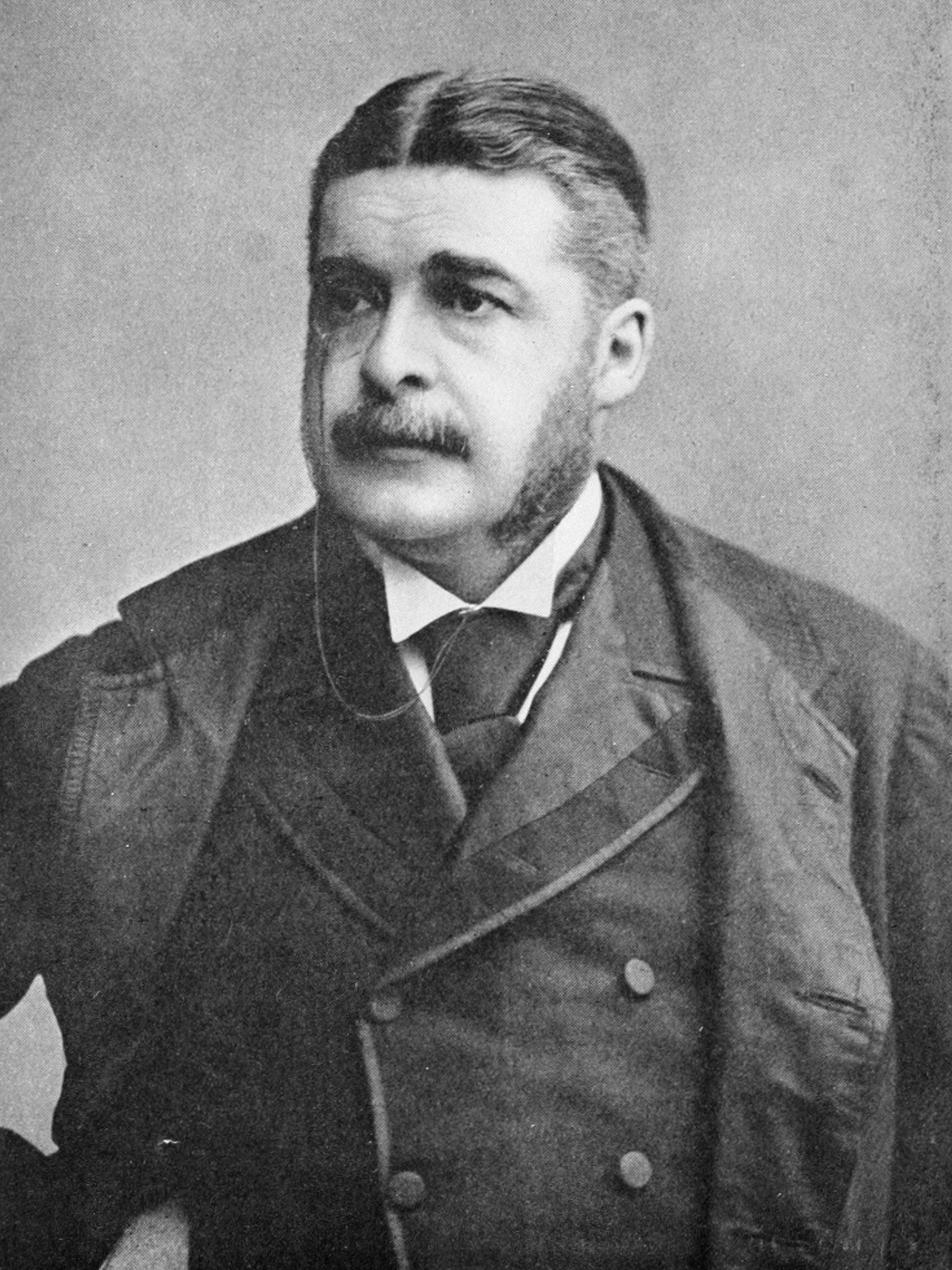
Clarke's friend and associate, Arthur Sullivan

Clarke was a close associate of Arthur Sullivan. In 1878, at Sullivan's instance, he was engaged by Carte as musical director of his touring Comedy-Opera Company from March to November 1878, while the Company presented a revival of Trial, the first provincial production of The Sorcerer, and, from September 1878, the first provincial production of H.M.S. Pinafore. He assisted Sullivan by arranging musical selections from H.M.S. Pinafore for the promenade concerts at Covent Garden in 1878 that stimulated audience interest in that opera. Sullivan described Clarke's arrangement as "most spirited" and conducted it at several of the promenade concerts in late August. Clarke also made an arrangement from The Pirates of Penzance for the promenade concerts in 1880.

Clarke later arranged the overtures for Gilbert and Sullivan's operas The Sorcerer (for its 1884 revival), The Mikado (1885) and Ruddigore (1887). He also assisted in the piano arrangement of Sullivan's 1886 cantata, The Golden Legend and helped prepare the score for printing. Sullivan biographer Gervase Hughes later strongly criticised Clarke's work, finding the Mikado overture carelessly constructed and his Ruddigore overture a "jumble" and "a crude selection, hardly redeemed by its spirited ending". Hughes also criticised Clarke's overture to The Sorcerer, though misattributing it to Alfred Cellier. Sullivan considered rewriting the Mikado overture and was thought to have sketched out a new overture on more symphonic lines, but no trace of it survives. Clarke's Ruddigore overture was dropped by the D'Oyly Carte Opera Company in 1919 in favour of a wholly rewritten overture by Geoffrey Toye.

In 1882 Clarke provided the music for Lord Tennyson's play The Promise of May, which was "a miserable fiasco", though Clarke's music was praised. He provided additional music, in 1883, for the English adaptation of Edmond Audran's Gillette de Narbonne. He also contributed to the music of the successful 1885 burlesque Little Jack Sheppard. In 1887, he accepted the post of musical director at the Comedy Theatre under the management of Herbert Beerbohm Tree.

=== Publications and compositions ===
1898 production of Clarke's operetta for boys, Hornpipe Harry

Clarke composed over 600 musical works, of which some 400 were published. His second symphony, in G minor, premiered in 1879, and he composed the music for some half dozen ballets and at least eleven operas. Compositions by Clarke mentioned over the years in The Musical Times showed the breadth of his interests, from part-songs, to organ works, to comedy: "Love and Gold": Four-Part Song; "Original Compositions for the Organ": No. 110; Magnificat and Nunc Dimittis in B Flat; "Sonatina for the Pianoforte"; "God so Loved the World";To the Audience: Humorous Four-Part Song; "They That Go down to the Sea in Ships"; Romance for Violin and Pianoforte; and "To a Red Rose".

In 1894, Clarke published The Daisy-Chain (Op. 352), an operetta for children in two acts, for which he wrote both words and music. He also wrote both the libretto and the score for Hornpipe Harry, in 1897, a well-reviewed show depicting the adventures of sailors cast ashore on a remote island. One of his last compositions was the one-act operetta The Outpost, first produced by the D'Oyly Carte Opera Company at the Savoy Theatre in July 1900. It was produced as a curtain raiser to The Pirates of Penzance and Patience until December 1900 and also ran on tour in 1901–02.

In 1888 Clarke published his Manual of Orchestration described by The Musical Times as an excellent little book. "As far as can be gathered, either from direct statements or implied directions, Gounod would be the model suggested for imitation, Wagner for avoidance." Clarke's conservatism caused comment from other reviewers; The Musical Standard mocked him for denying that Wagner was a master of orchestration: "Mr. Clarke should re-edit his work, cutting out all this nonsense. It might then form an admirable book for the beginner". Clarke also wrote several other books and articles about orchestration, as well as some fiction and song lyrics.

=== Later life ===
In 1889, Clarke went to Australia, where he succeeded Frederick Cowen as conductor of the Victorian National Orchestra in Melbourne. He was also made inspector of Australian army bands, and given the honorary rank of captain. He did not enjoy Melbourne; after returning to England in 1892, he gave a talk describing his experiences, giving "many valuable hints … to those who might think of accepting appointments in the Australian Colonies". His comments drew a rejoinder from an Australian writer who accused him of "incompetence and lack of interest" while in Melbourne.

Clarke was appointed conductor of the Carl Rosa Opera Company in 1893. In 1899 he composed and conducted the incidental music for John Martin Harvey's adaptation of A Tale of Two Cities. Clarke was forced to retire around 1901 because of failing eyesight. In later life, Clarke suffered from health problems that affected his mind. According to Ellen Terry, Clarke's "brilliant gifts... 'o'er-leaped' themselves, and he ended his days in a lunatic asylum."

Clarke died at Banstead Asylum in Surrey in 1912, aged 72.
