= The Earl and the Girl =

Musical comedy by Seymour Hicks, Percy Greenbank and Ivan Caryll

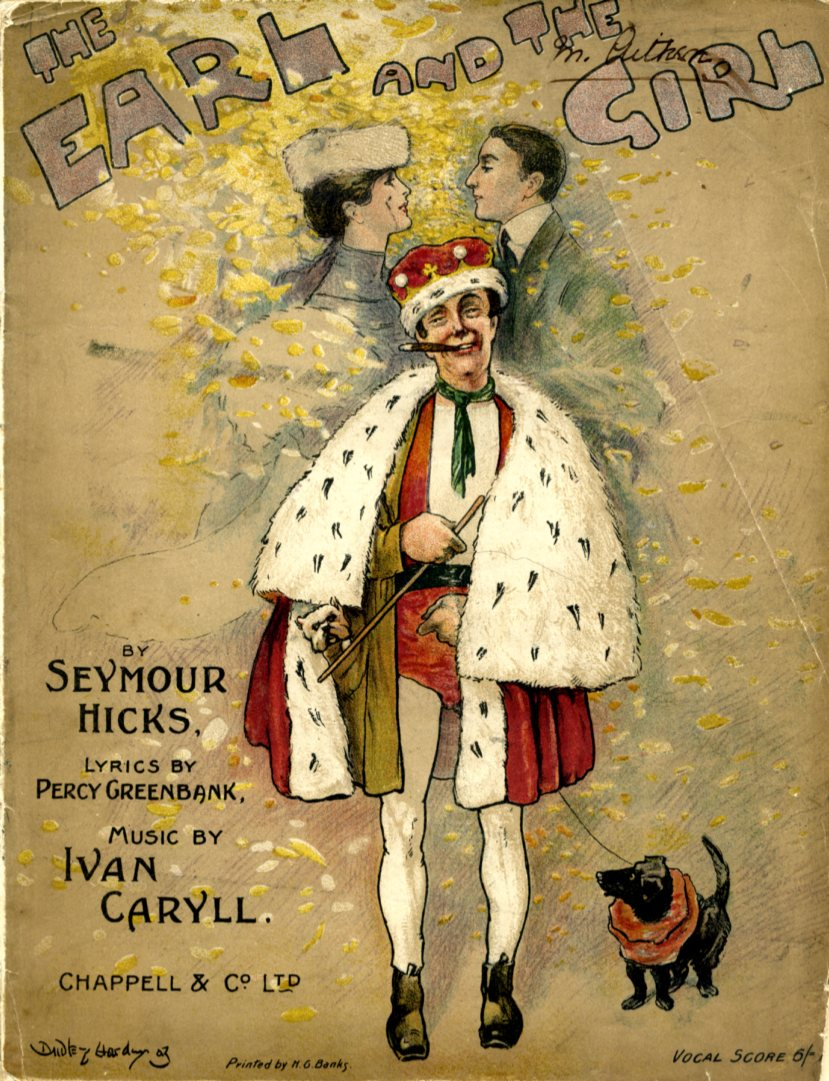
- Vocal Score
- Music: Ivan Caryll
- Lyrics: Percy Greenbank
- Book: Seymour Hicks
- Productions: 1903–1904 West End; 1905 Broadway

The Earl and the Girl is a musical comedy in two acts, with a book by Seymour Hicks, lyrics by Percy Greenbank and music by Ivan Caryll. It was produced by William Greet and opened at the Adelphi Theatre in London on 10 December 1903. It transferred to the Lyric Theatre on 12 September 1904, running for a total of 371 performances. It also ran at the Casino Theatre in New York beginning on 4 November 1905 for 148 performances (with some added music and lyrics by Jerome Kern and others), starring Eddie Foy and W. H. Denny. A production toured Australia in 1906 and 1907. A revival in London in 1914 ran for a total of 107 performances, and there were later revivals and tours.

The original London cast included a number of performers who had recently appeared in productions of the D'Oyly Carte Opera Company, which was no longer performing at the Savoy Theatre at the time of the premiere of The Earl and the Girl, including Walter Passmore, Henry Lytton, Robert Evett, M. R. Morand, Reginald Crompton, Powis Pinder, Charles Childerstone, Alec Fraser, Ernest Torrence, Rudolph Lewis, Agnes Fraser, and Louie Pounds. Lytton later used the song "My Cosy Corner" from the show in his music hall acts with much success, and made a recording of it. Kern's song "How'd You Like to Spoon with Me?" was interpolated into the New York production, and it also became a hit.

== Roles and original cast ==
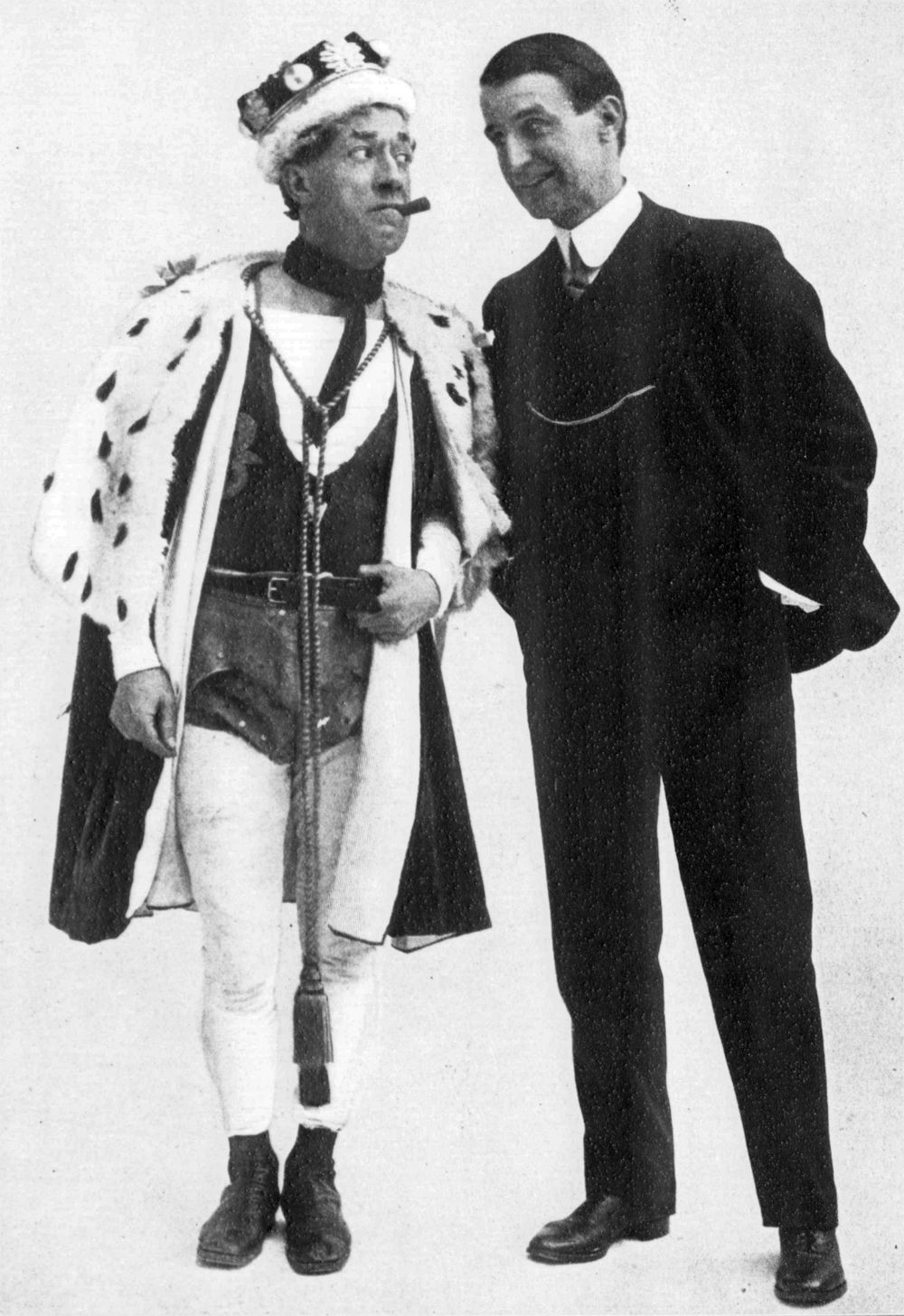
Passmore and Lytton

The four pursuers

- Jim Cheese (A Dog Trainer) – Walter Passmore
- Dick Wargrave (The Real Heir) – Henry A. Lytton
- The Hon. Crewe Boodle (The Supposed Heir) – Robert Evett
- A. Bunker Bliss (Elphin Haye's Uncle) – John C. Dixon
- Downham (An American Solicitor) – M. R. Morand
- Mr. Talk (An English Solicitor) – Frank Elliston
- Mr. Hazell (Host of the Fallowfield Arms) – Reginald Crompton
- Friends of Crewe Boodle

- Dudley Cranbourne – Powis Pinder
- George Bellamy – Charles Childerstone
- Hugh Wallander – Alec Fraser
- Rossiter – Ernest Torrence

- Footmen at Stole Hall

- George – Rudolph Lewis
- Charles – J. Gordon

- Elphin Haye (An American Heiress) – Agnes Fraser
- Liza Shoddam (Jim Cheese's Sweetheart) – Florence Lloyd
- Mrs. Shimmering Black (A Strong Lady) – Helen Kinnaird
- Daisy Fallowfield (Elphin Haye's Friend) – Louie Pounds
- Miss Virginia Bliss (Elphin Haye's Aunt) – Phyllis Broughton
- Ladies of Crewe Boodle's Party: Lena Leibrandt, Olive Rae, G. Thornton, Miss Standen and Winifred Hart-Dyke
- Guests at the Hall: Florrie Sutherland, Rosie Edwards, Lily Mcintyre, L. Montez and the misses Hammerton, Taylor, Glenn, Williams, Ricards, Francis, Ohmead, Beresford and Harris

== Synopsis ==
Louie Pounds and Robert Evett

Act I

The Hon. Crewe Boodel believes himself to be the heir to the earldom of Hole. He and a party of his friends are on their way to a fancy dress ball at Hole Hall, but their vehicle breaks down, and they take refuge in a country inn, the Fallowfield Arms. Jim Cheese, the owner of a troupe of performing dogs, and his coster sweetheart, Liza Shoddam, have walked from London to attend the local fair. They are at first mistaken by Boodel's party for two more guests for the fancy dress party. Jim and Liza are in debt to the landlord of the inn, who threatens to turn them out or have them arrested.

The real heir to the Hole property is Dick Wargrave, a friend of Boodel's. He has eloped from Paris with a schoolgirl, Elphin Haye, who is an American heiress masquerading as a penniless orphan. They arrive at the inn, preceded by four people who are in pursuit of them. A. Bunker Bliss is after Dick for eloping with his niece, and, being a good republican, Bliss is not impressed by Dick's earldom. Mrs. Shimmering Black is after Dick because the Earl of Hole has jilted her daughter (in fact it is Boodel who has done so). Mr. Talk and Mr. Downham are both lawyers; the first is English and the second American. They are both in search of the missing heir and after the reward for finding him. Dick is unaware that these two are bearing him good news, and when he learns from the landlord that some strangers have been asking about him, he concludes that there is trouble brewing.

Guests at the Hall

Dick persuades Jim Cheese to exchange identities with him, taking his name and even his girlfriend, and entrusting Elphin to Jim's care. The American lawyer finds Jim and tells him that he is an earl, and advances him money on the strength of his title. Elphir runs across a friend, Daisy Fallowfield, at the inn, and the whole party go off to the ball, where Elphir has to introduce Jim to her aunt, Miss Virginia Bliss, as her fiancé.

Act II

All the characters turn up at the ball at Hole Hall. Boodel brings Dick and passes him off as another guest. Liza slips in after Jim, who is announced as the Earl of Hole. The four pursuers gatecrash the party. Jim has a rough time with Bunker Bliss and Mrs. Black when they find him – the former is intent on shooting him, and the latter, a circus strongwoman, is a terrifying prospect – but when he tells them the truth about who is who, everyone is satisfied. Mrs Black's wrath subsides when she realises that the man who jilted her daughter is not, in fact, an earl, Bunker Bliss is appeased, and all ends happily.

== Musical numbers ==
Lytton, Florence Lloyd, Passmore and Agnes Fraser

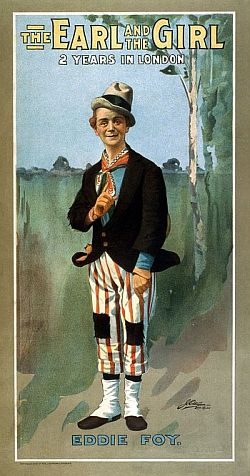
Poster from the New York production, 1905

Act I

- 1. Opening Chorus - (After A Capital Day)
- 2. Song (Daisy) and Chorus - "The Sporting Girl" (Some Girls I Know Like Living In A Town)
- 3. Duet (Jim and Liza) "Celebrities" (Oh, The Public Don't Appreciate Them Dogs)
- 4. Concerted Number "Little Ladies In Distress" (Oh, Dear Me, What On Earth Are We To Do?)
- 5. Song (Daisy) and Chorus "Shopping" (When My Ship Comes In)
- 6. Song (Crewe Boodle) "Thou Art My Rose" (In The Hush Of Silver Morning)
- 7. Song (Downham) "I Haven't A Moment To Spare" (I'm Sure I Shall Always Remember)
- 8. Quartet (Talk, Bunker Bliss, Mrs. Black, and Downham) "When We Get Hold Of Him" (I Know Somebody I Want To Meet)
- 9. Duet (Elphin and Dick) "We Were So Happy, You And I" (The First Time That We Met)
- 10. Song (Elphin) and Chorus "When A Maiden Leaves School " (When A Maiden Leaves School)
- 11. Song (Dick) and Chorus "By The Shore Of The Mediterranean" (Away, Come Away From The Gray Land)
- 12. Quartet (Dick, Elphin, Jim, and Liza) "For One Night Only" (To-Night You'll Be A Bloomin' Swell)
- 13. Finale (Fancy His Getting The Earldom!)

Act II

- 14. Opening Chorus (Madly and Merrily Here We Go)
- 15. Song (Daisy) "The Prettiest Girl In Town" (There's A Girl Who Is Always So Busy)
- 16. Song (Elphin) "Careless Kate" (Simple Little Maiden Once I Used To Know)
- 17. Chorus "Hail! Your Lordship" (Hail! The Heir So Long Expected)
- 18. Song (Jim) And Chorus "I'm A Lord, What Ho!" (Behold In Me A Belted Earl)
- 19. Vocal Gavotte "To And Fro" (To And Fro, Dignified And Slow)
- 20. Song (Dick) "My Cosy Corner Girl" (Beside The Murmuring Sad Sea Waves)
- 21. Song (Daisy) "Sammy" (Did You Ever Meet The Fellow Fine And Dandy)
- 22. Song (Crewe Boodle) and Chorus "The Grenadiers" (There's A Far-Off Hum)
- 23. Song (Crewe Boodle) "The Queen Of June" (Out In The Garden Closes)
- 24. Finale (By The Shore Of The Mediterranean)

== Critical reception ==
The Times prefaced its review with a lament for the bygone days of Savoy opera, and for the defection of Savoy stars to the new genre of Edwardian musical comedy. As to the show, the paper thought "the merits of the piece are neither great nor new … pointless, often tasteless." The music was pronounced "cheap in form and old-fashioned in its kind." The journal Judy thought the production overdone: "the stage is too crowded, and the restlessness of the chorus becomes irritating." The reviewer praised the principal performers and singled out Louie Pounds in particular: "a voice which is worthy of better things."

Of the Broadway production, The New York Times wrote, "a veritable frolic from start to finish, light, tuneful, and full of color, and engaging a company of exceptionally clever people. Reviewing the Australian production, The Morning Bulletin, wrote, "Mr. J. F. Sheridan has surely produced few comedies in which the fun was so fast and furious."
