= John D'Auban =

English dancer, choreographer and actor

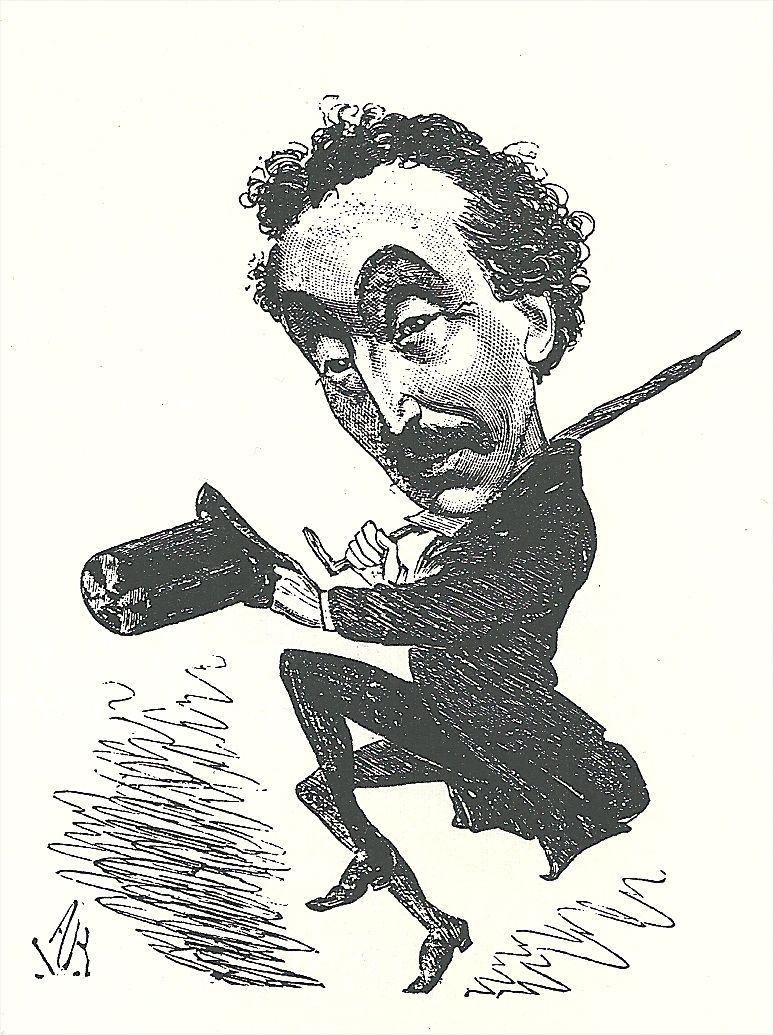
Contemporary press caricature of D'Auban

Frederick John D'Auban (1842 – 15 April 1922) was an English dancer, choreographer and actor of the Victorian and Edwardian eras. Famous during his lifetime as the ballet-master at the Theatre Royal, Drury Lane, he is best remembered as the choreographer of many of the Gilbert and Sullivan operas.

After performing as a child with his family, D'Auban continued a career as a comic dancer in music hall and pantomime. He also served as dance master for the Alhambra Theatre, the Gaiety Theatre, London, and, for decades, Drury Lane. In 1868, he began a long association with W. S. Gilbert, staging the dances for most of the original productions of the Gilbert and Sullivan operas, including H.M.S. Pinafore (1878) and The Mikado (1885), as well as many other Savoy operas. Between the 1860s and 1909, D'Auban choreographed more than 150 productions, including pantomimes, burlesques, musical comedies and comic operas. He also taught dance to many who became famous performers.

== Biography ==
=== Early years ===
As a child, D'Auban appeared with his sister, Marie, as Madame D'Auban's "celebrated infant dancers", from 1850 onwards, and continued to appear as part of the D'Auban family song and dance act throughout his childhood. As adults, he and his sister appeared together in a comic dance double act at the Crystal Palace in 1863. They appeared together in a Harlequinade at the opening of the Surrey Theatre, as Harlequin and Columbine, which ran during the Christmas season that year. They repeated their Harlequinade with variations during the Christmas seasons of 1868, 1869 and 1871.

=== Burlesque, pantomime and other early work ===
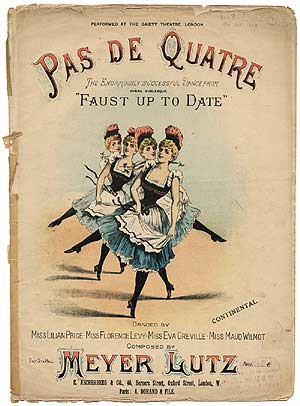
The "Pas de Quatre" from Faust up to date (1888), one of many Gaiety burlesques choreographed by D'Auban

D'Auban quickly became popular as a grotesque dancer and "star trap" performer in London music halls early in his career. From 1865 to 1868, he danced in many of the Alhambra Theatre burlesques and pantomimes under director John Hollingshead. He made a sensation in Paris in 1866, introducing that city to the star-trap. According to Hollingshead, D'Auban was the champion of star-trap jumpers, able to spring through the trap, from below the stage, high up in the air in sight of the audience.

D'Auban began his forty-year association with W. S. Gilbert in 1868 by appearing in the bill at the opening of Hollingshead's Gaiety Theatre, London, including as one of two mysterious fiddlers in Gilbert's burlesque Robert the Devil. The other was John Warde, elder brother of Willie Warde. D'Auban and John Warde were billed as the theatre's "principal grotesque dancers and pantomimists". D'Auban then acted as ballet-master at the Gaiety, choreographing its famous burlesques, until 1891. In 1870 and in 1875 at the Gaiety, D'Auban choreographed Charles Dibdin's musical farce, The Waterman. From 1868 to 1909, D'Auban arranged the dances for more than 150 productions in the West End, at 30 different theatres.

D'Auban married Warde's sister, Emma, in 1871, with whom he also performed. In the 1871 Christmas season, in the Harlequinade section of the pantomime Nip Van Winkle at the Pavilion Theatre, D'Auban played Harlequin, Emma was the "Harlequin à la Watteau", D'Auban's sister Marie was Columbine, and John Warde was Clown. The next Christmas, D'Auban and Warde appeared together as the eponymous Valentine and Orson at the Elephant and Castle Theatre. At the Gaiety, D'Auban appeared in and choreographed Fiz-Gig, "a new pantomimic ballet" in 1874.

=== Comic opera; Drury Lane ===
In 1876, D'Auban arranged the dances for the Gilbert and Frederic Clay comic opera Princess Toto, starring Kate Santley. In 1877, D'Auban began working with Richard D'Oyly Carte, Gilbert and Arthur Sullivan by arranging the dances for their comic opera The Sorcerer. In 1878, D'Auban trained Gilbert in his dances as Harlequin for the Harlequinade section of The Forty Thieves. D'Auban arranged the dances for the next Gilbert and Sullivan opera, H.M.S. Pinafore, which became extraordinarily successful. For the Christmas season in 1879, he choreographed the extravaganza burlesque of Gulliver's Travels by H. J. Byron at the Gaiety.

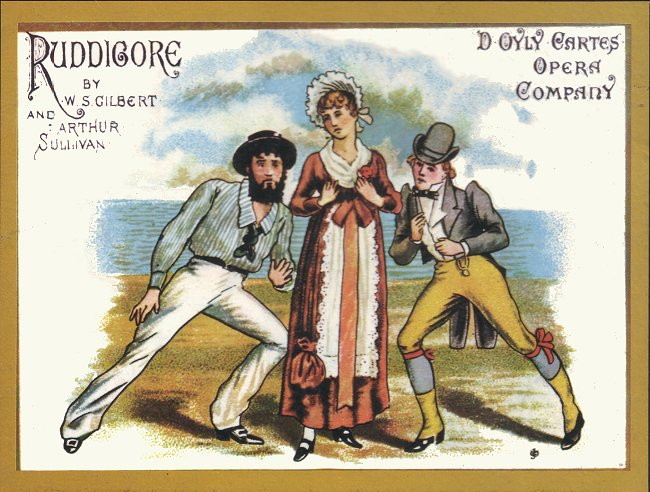
"In Sailing O'er Life's Ocean", a choreographed number from Ruddigore, Act I (1887)

In 1880, D'Auban choreographed and appeared with his wife and sister in E. L. Blanchard's pantomime of Mother Goose at the Theatre Royal, Drury Lane. Thereafter, until at least 1909, he was ballet-master and director at Drury Lane, especially of the pantomimes, where he also continued to perform in the Christmas pantomimes. His son, Ernest Henry D'Auban (1874–1941), became the stage manager at Drury Lane for many years. In 1881, D'Auban appeared in and arranged the dances for Robinson Crusoe, followed in subsequent years by such Drury Lane pantomimes as Sinbad The Sailor, Cinderella and Aladdin. In 1880, he choreographed Billee Taylor at the Imperial Theatre, Franz von Suppé's Boccaccio for H. B. Farnie, The Vicar of Bray at the Globe Theatre, and Rip van Winkle by Henri Meilhac, Phillipe Gille and Farnie, both at the Comedy Theatre.

In 1886, D'Auban choreographed Vetah, a comic opera with a libretto by Kate Santley and music by Firmin Bernicat and Georges Jacobi, which toured the British provinces in 1886. He played Demonico in Frankenstein, or The Vampire's Victim in 1887 at the Gaiety and arranged the dances. He also choreographed Faust up to date by Meyer Lutz, including his famous ballet music, a Pas de Quatre (1888), that became very popular and is still available today on CD. In 1889, he choreographed Cinderella; Or, Ladybird, Ladybird, Fly Away Home at Her Majesty's Theatre and both choreographed and appeared in Aladdin, and the Wonderful Lamp; or, The Willow Pattern plate and the Flying Crystal Palace at the Crystal Palace. Other later Gaiety burlesques choreographed by D'Auban included Ruy Blas and the Blasé Roué (1889) and Carmen Up to Data (1890).

D'Auban continued to choreograph most of the Gilbert and Sullivan and other Savoy Theatre pieces throughout the 1880s and 1890s. These included Iolanthe (1882),Princess Ida (1884), The Mikado (1885) (D'Auban is played by Andy Serkis in the 1999 film Topsy-Turvy concerning the making of The Mikado), Ruddigore (1887), The Yeomen of the Guard (1888), The Vicar of Bray (1892), Captain Billy (1892), Haddon Hall (1892), Jane Annie (1892), Utopia Limited (1893), The Chieftain (1894), The Grand Duke (1896), His Majesty (1897), The Grand Duchess of Gerolstein (1897), The Beauty Stone (1898) and The Emerald Isle (1901).

=== 1890s and 1900s ===
D'Auban rehearsing W. H. Denny for Haddon Hall

The 1890s were D'Auban's most prolific decade as a choreographer, with more than 70 productions in the West End, in some of which he also danced. In addition to the many comic operas that he choreographed at the Savoy in the 1990s, he choreographed a series of musical pieces at the Lyric Theatre, beginning with The Red Hussar (1889), and including La Cigale (1890), Little Christopher Columbus (1893) and others. In 1890, D'Auban played the Beast in the Drury Lane's Christmas pantomime of Beauty and the Beast, and he both performed in and choreographed Humpty Dumpty or, Harlequin the Yellow Dwarf, and the Fair One with the Golden Locks (1891). He and his wife danced in a revised version of The Golden Web, libretto by Frederick Corder and B. C. Stephenson, music by Arthur Goring Thomas at the Lyric in 1893. He was the resident choreographer at the Adelphi Theatre in 1892 to 1893.

His other choreographic work during this period embraced pantomime, comic opera and musical comedy, including a revival of the hit comic opera Dorothy by B. C. Stephenson and Alfred Cellier at the Trafalgar Square Theatre (1892), Gilbert's The Mountebanks at the Lyric (1892), The Black Domino by George R. Sims and Robert Buchanan at the Adelphi Theatre (1893) and Gilbert's His Excellency at the Lyric (1894). At the beginning of the transition of British musical theatre from comic opera and burlesque to Edwardian musical comedy, he choreographed An Artist's Model at Daly's Theatre for George Edwardes in 1895. In 1896, he choreographed a revised version of a musical, The New Barmaid, followed by A Man About Town and The Mermaids at the Avenue Theatre, Aladdin at Drury Lane, in which his son Ernest appeared with Decima Moore, Dan Leno and Paul Cinquevalli and Black-ey'ed Susan at the Adelphi. He then choreographed the British production of Lost, Strayed or Stolen (1897) a musical comedy by J. Cheever Goodwin, Woolson Morse and Leslie Stuart at the Duke of York's Theatre and Babes in the Wood at Drury Lane (1898). In 1897, he was also back at Her Majesty's Theatre with Rip Van Winkle, Hansel and Gretel and The 'Prentice Pillar and at the Shaftesbury Theatre choreographing The Yashmak and The Wizard of the Nile.

Letty Lind, one of D'Auban's students, performing a skirt dance in 1890

In 1900 and 1901, D'Auban returned to the Globe Theatre with The Gay Pretenders, A Little Supper and Sweet Nell of Old Drury. Also in 1900, he was at the Haymarket Theatre with Sweet Nell of Old Drury and The School for Scandal. In 1903, he choreographed Monsieur Beaucaire at the Imperial, also choreographing many revivals of this piece in London throughout the decade. He choreographed W. S. Gilbert's Harlequin and the Fairy's Dilemma at the Garrick Theatre (1904). In 1905, he first choreographed The Scarlet Pimpernel at the New Theatre, a work that he saw through several revivals. He then choreographed revivals of The Yeomen of the Guard (1906) and The Gondoliers (1907) at the Savoy for Helen Carte. His final productions were Gilbert's last opera, Fallen Fairies (1909) and another Aladdin at Drury Lane, both in December 1909.

=== Dance teacher and last years ===
D'Auban became so famous as a dance teacher that his teaching style became known as the "D'Auban school". Among his dance students were Alice Lethbridge, Sylvia Grey, Mabel Love, Margaret Morris, Lillie Langtry, Mary Anderson, Ruby Ray and Letty Lind. He partly inspired the art of skirt dancing.

The humour magazine Punch honoured D'Auban in the following verse:

See Mr. Johnny D'Auban,

He's so quick and nimble,
He'd dance on a thimble,

He's more like an elf than a man.

D'Auban died at his home in Maida Vale, London at the age of 80.

== Portrayals ==
In Topsy-Turvy, a 1999 movie about the creation of The Mikado, D'Auban is portrayed by Andy Serkis.
