= Florence Easton (1890s soprano) =

19th-century British singer and actress

Florence Easton was a British singer and actress who sang with the D'Oyly Carte Opera Company in the early 1890s.

Easton appeared with the D'Oyly Carte Opera Company in Savoy Operas from May 1892 to June 1894. In Captain Billy, a one-act curtain raiser that accompanied The Vicar of Bray, she played the small role of Polly in May and June 1892. She originated another small role, Deborah, in Haddon Hall in September 1892, and in April 1893 she had the opportunity to play the leading role of Dorothy Vernon in that opera for several nights until the end of that opera's run. In 1893, she also appeared in the small part of Winifred in Mr. Jericho, by Harry Greenbank and Ernest Ford, a curtain raiser to Haddon Hall and Jane Annie, also at the Savoy Theatre. In 1893, she was supposed to create the small role of Phylla in the original production of Gilbert and Sullivan's Utopia, Limited, but her understudy, Miss Howell-Hersee, sang the role from 7 October until 7 November 1893, when Easton took over the part.
