= Herbert Railton =

English artist (1857-1910)

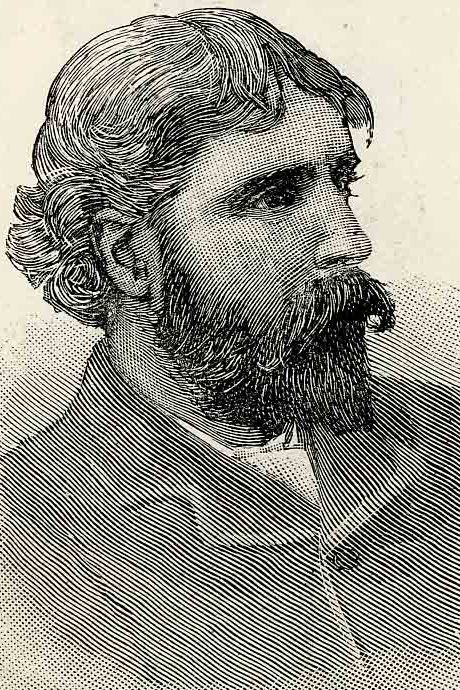
Herbert Railton

Cover illustration by M. Browne and Herbert Railton for the October 1, 1892 Illustrated London News, showing a scene from Sydney Grundy and Arthur Sullivan's Haddon Hall.

Herbert Railton (21 November 1857 – 15 March 1910), was an English artist and leading black and white illustrator of books and magazines.

== Life and work ==
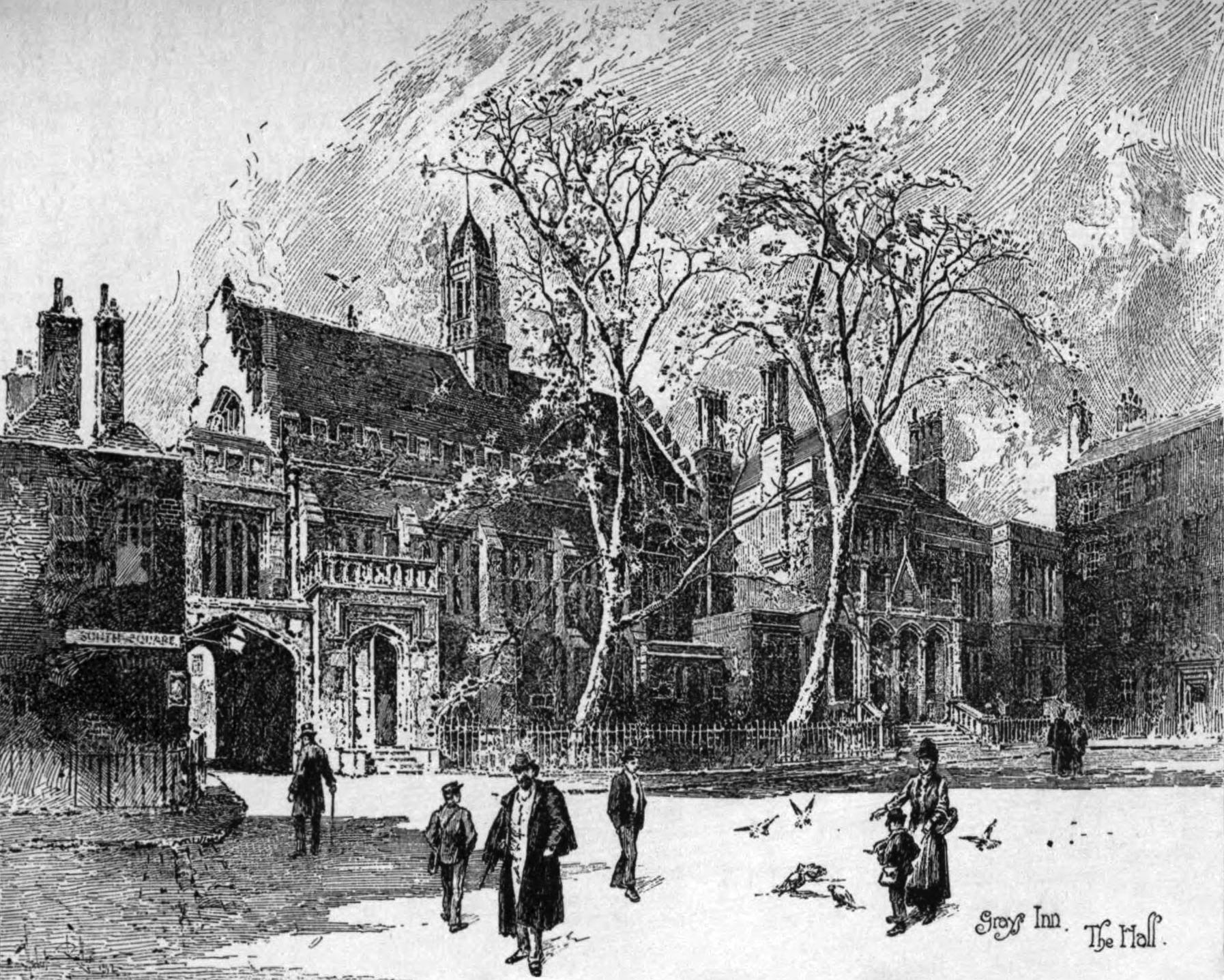
Gray's Inn, London (1895)

Railton was born in Pleasington, near Blackburn, Lancashire, and educated at Mechlin in Belgium and Ampleforth College in North Yorkshire (England). He trained as an architect at the firm of W.S. Varley in Blackburn. He joined the local literary club where he met artist Charles Haworth, who became his mentor, and gave him further instruction in working in black and white.

After his drawings of a railway accident at Blackburn station (1881) were published in the Illustrated Sporting and Dramatic News, Railton went on to become one of the leading illustrators of his day. He moved to London and married Frances, another illustrator - they had one child, Ione, who also became an illustrator.

Railton provided many black and white illustrations for magazines and books - including editions of books by famous authors such Thomas Hood (The Haunted House), Oliver Goldsmith, Henry Fielding, Samuel Johnson etc. and travel guides.

Railton died of pneumonia in 1910, aged 53.

== Selected books illustrated by Railton ==
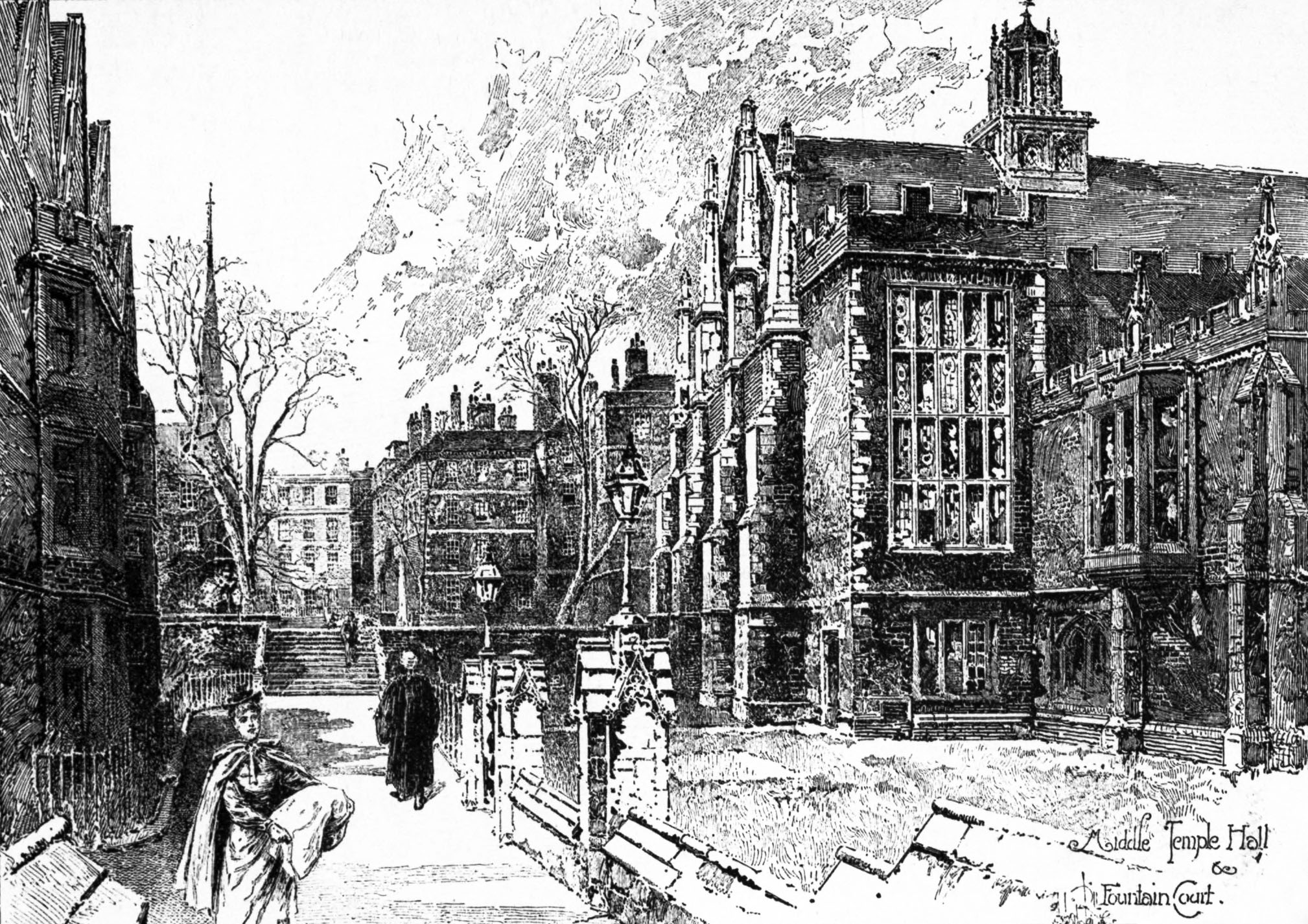
Middle Temple Hall and Fountain Court, London (1895)

- Thomas Lovell Beddoes. The Poetical Works of Thomas Lovell Beddoes (J.M. Dent & Co., 1890).
- William Benham. Winchester Cathedral (Isbister & Co. Ltd., 1897).
- C. M. Church. Wells Cathedral (Ibister & Co. ltd., 1897).
- John Lionel Darby. Chester Cathedral (Isbister & Co. Ltd., 1898).
- Ernest Gilliat-Smith. The Story of Bruges (J.M. Dent & Sons Ltd., 1909).
- Cecil Headlam. The story of Chartres (J.M. Dent & Co., 1902).
- Cecil Headlam. The Story of Oxford (J.M. Dent & Co., 1907).
- Thomas Hood. The Haunted House (Lawrence & Bullen, 1896).
- William H. Hutton. Hampton Court (John C. Nimmo, 1897).
- Sidney Lee. Stratford on Avon (Seeley & Co. Ltd., 1904).
- W.J. Loftie. The Inns of Court and Chancery (Seeley & Co., 1908)
- B.E. Martin In the footprints of Charles Lamb (Charles Scribner's sons, 1890).
- W.C.E. Newbolt. The cathedrals of England (Thomas Whittaker, 1899).
- W.C.E. Newbolt. St. Paul's Cathedral (Isbister & Co. Ltd., 1897).
- W.H.O. Smeaton. Edinburgh and its story (J.M. Dent & Co., 1904).
- Charles William Stubbs. Cambridge and its story (J.M. Dent & Co., 1903).
- W.O. Tristram. Coaching days and coaching ways (MacMillan & Co., 1893).
- M.G. Williamson. Edinburgh; a historical and topographical account of the city (Methuen & Co., 1906).
