= Rudolph Lewis (bass-baritone) =

English singer and actor (died 1917)

Rudolph Lewis as Jem Johnson in A Princess of Kensington (1903)

Rudolph Lewis (2 March 1846 – 21 November 1917) was a bass-baritone known for creating several small roles in the Gilbert and Sullivan operas including Go-To in The Mikado (1885) and Old Adam Goodheart in Ruddigore (1887).

Lewis worked as a wood engraver for two decades before beginning a performing career that would last more than three decades. In 1884, at the age of 40, he joined the D'Oyly Carte Opera Company, with which he performed steadily for the next decade at the Savoy Theatre. He sang in the chorus, created small bass roles such as Go-To in The Mikado, Old Adam in Ruddigore, Samuel Chunk in Captain Billy and Sing-Song Simeon in Haddon Hall, and he played such other roles as the Boatswain in H.M.S. Pinafore.

He later taught music and, from 1893, performed with the Carl Rosa Opera Company before touring in Edwardian musical comedies. From 1900, he again toured with D'Oyly Carte and later performed with the company in London. The other roles he created during this period included the Tinker in Merrie England and Jem Johnson in A Princess of Kensington both in London and on tour. He performed in musical comedies in London from 1903 to 1905 and continued to sing and act after this with less success until the First World War.

== Early life ==
Lewis was born in Cripplegate in the City of London, the son of Elizabeth (née Costin) and Joshua Lewis (born 1815), a straw hat and bonnet blacker. In 1861 the 15 year old Rudolph Lewis was a wood engraver, an occupation he was still following 20 years later. In the meantime he took singing lessons with Giovanni Febo Alfeo Gilardoni.

He married Frances (née Dalton) in Lambeth in 1873, and the couple had a son, Rudolph Charles Lewis (1877–1942), who worked in an iron foundry, and a daughter, Frances Louisa Elizabeth Lewis (born 1881). Lewis left his daughter, aged eight, in the care of his eldest sister, Amy Eliza Lewis. When Amy died in 1903 Frances worked in servant's positions before entering a workhouse in 1907. By 1911 she was registered as a homeless pauper. She later worked at Ellis and Turner in Aldersgate. By 1912, this had shut, and she was listed in another workhouse infirmary as "destitute".

== Early career and D'Oyly Carte ==
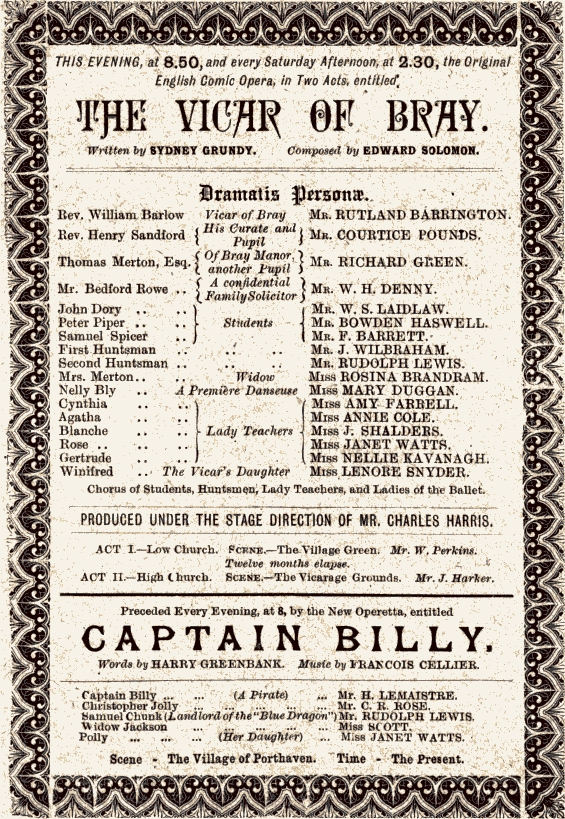
Savoy Theatre programme: double bill of Captain Billy and The Vicar of Bray – Lewis appeared in both

In 1882, Gilardoni's pupils gave a concert performance of Faust, during which Lewis sang Mephistopheles, drawing especial praise. By October 1884, at the age of 40, he was performing at the Savoy Theatre in the chorus of the D'Oyly Carte Opera Company in the revival of Gilbert and Sullivan's The Sorcerer and Trial by Jury. In March of the following year he originated the small role of Go-To in The Mikado, which was created because the baritone voice of Frederick Bovill, who played Pish-Tush, was not deep enough to bring out the bass line in the madrigal "Brightly Dawns Our Wedding Day". Lewis also created the role of Old Adam Goodheart in Ruddygore (1887). Of his Act II duet with Lewis in Ruddygore, George Grossmith later wrote:

"Sullivan used to amuse himself by making me sing bass in one number of an opera and tenor in another. In Ruddygore, Sir Arthur had engaged a man to play the servant [Old Adam] ... who had an enormous bass voice, and who had to go down to the lower E flat. Singularly enough, he could go down to G, and then he dropped out entirely, and I did the [low E-flat] below. Generally the audience roared with laughter, and it absolutely brought down the house."

During this period Lewis occasionally sang in benefits and concerts, often together with other Savoyards, including as Mr Molehill in Won By a Trick at the Gaiety Theatre for Meyer Lutz's benefit in 1885 and Sparafucile in Rigoletto in 1886. He appeared in the first revival of H.M.S. Pinafore (1887–1888) as the Boatswain, and in the chorus for the first revival of The Pirates of Penzance (1888). In June 1887 with Grossmith and other D'Oyly Carte colleagues, he appeared as the Usher in the benefit performance of Trial by Jury for Amy Roselle at the Lyceum Theatre.

In 1888 Lewis married again, to Alice Maud née Wharton, but the marriage appears not to have lasted. He reprised the role of Go-To in the first revival of The Mikado (1888) and originated the role of the Fourth Yeoman in The Yeomen of the Guard (1888–1889). He was in the chorus of The Gondoliers (1889) and was promoted to the role of Ottavio in April 1890. During the run of The Nautch Girl at the Savoy, he originated the role of Samuel Chunk in Alfred Cellier's companion piece Captain Billy (1891) and played the Second Huntsman in The Vicar of Bray (1892) before creating the role of Sing-Song Simeon in Haddon Hall (1892).

== Carl Rosa, touring and later London roles ==
In 1893 Lewis left the D'Oyly Carte Company and joined the Carl Rosa Opera Company where he played Ramfis in Aida, one of the Anabaptists in The Prophet and one of the Knights in Tannhäuser. He then toured the British provinces in Edwardian musical comedies, playing the Vizier in Morocco Bound (1894–95), Moran in Robbery Under Arms (1895), John Brown in The Shop Girl (1896), in Skipped by the Light of the Moon (1897), John Mayfield in Kitty (1897) and Donald in Little Miss Nobody (1899). In January 1900 he played Dido Bunce in Two Little Vagabonds by George R. Sims at the Adelphi Theatre.

After this, he rejoined D'Oyly Carte and toured in The Rose of Persia as the Royal Executioner, from April to December 1900. In the 1901 census Lewis described himself as a Professor of Music. Also in 1901 he returned to the Savoy where he was a chorister in The Emerald Isle, appearing in some performances as Sergeant Pincher. He next played So-Hi there in the shortened version of The Willow Pattern that played as the curtain raiser to the 1901 to 1902 revival of Iolanthe. Next, in Merrie England (April 1902), he created the part of the Tinker and then played Jem Johnson in January 1903 in the original production of A Princess of Kensington before playing the role on tour in May 1903.

On the conclusion of the tour Lewis left D'Oyly Carte and was at the Adelphi Theatre (and later at the Lyric Theatre) in The Earl and the Girl as Rossiter from December 1903. At the same time he appeared in 23 matinee performances as The Witch in Little Hans Andersen at the Adelphi. He appeared in the musical The Talk of the Town (1905) by Seymour Hicks at the Lyric Theatre and played in the June 1906 matinee performance of Trial by Jury to benefit of Ellen Terry, alongside W. S. Gilbert and many of his old D'Oyly Carte colleagues, at the Theatre Royal, Drury Lane.

== Last years ==
In 1909 he was again touring in Little Hans Andersen. Later, he seems to have been relegated to the chorus in various productions. He was credited as an "attendant" in The Golden Doom at the Theatre Royal Haymarket in 1912, and in 1914 was touring in a George Edwardes production, The Marriage Market. On his death in Lambeth in 1917 Variety stated that he had been "recently playing at Daly's", but it is not recorded in what capacity.

== Sources ==
- Wearing, J. P. The London Stage 1900–1909: A Calendar of Productions, Performers, and Personnel, Rowman & Littlefield (2014)
