= Rosina Brandram =

British opera singer and actress (1845–1907)

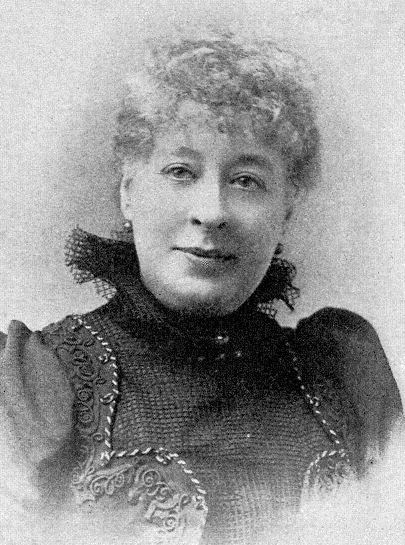
Rosina Brandram, from an advertisement for The Emerald Isle in The Sketch, 1901

Rosina Brandram (2 July 1845 – 28 February 1907) was an English opera singer and actress primarily known for creating many of the contralto roles in the Savoy operas with the D'Oyly Carte Opera Company.

Brandram joined the D'Oyly Carte company in 1877 as a chorister and understudy. By 1879, she was originating roles with the company, and she became its principal contralto in 1884, creating roles in seven of the famous Gilbert and Sullivan operas, as well as many other Sullivan comic operas. She was the only principal to appear in every original Sullivan production at the Savoy Theatre, and she performed with the company until 1903, when it left the Savoy. After leaving D'Oyly Carte, she played a few more roles with other companies before retiring from the stage.

== Life and career ==
=== Beginnings ===
Brandram was born Rosina Moult in Southwark, London. She was the elder child and only daughter of William Moult and his partner (later wife), Sarah Gosling. (Note: Sarah Gosling was separated from her first husband, after whose death in 1850 she married Moult, with whom she had been living for six years. Moult was a cab-driver, although in later life Brandram spoke of growing up "surrounded by every luxury that wealthy parents could command".) By her own account, she was educated at a boarding school in Cricklewood, North London, and later at Le Havre in Normandy. She recalled being taken to Italy by her parents and being introduced to Gaetano Nava, a singing teacher whose pupils had included Charles Santley. After that she studied in London with Frank Romer. She later said that at the time she had no thought of taking up singing as a career, but she had, in the words of one obituarist, "a very thorough musical education in Italy and England". In 1864, aged 19, she married Champnays Charles Butcher, an auctioneer. By the 1880s they were living apart; he died in 1884 aged 49. They had no children.

Brandram joined Richard D'Oyly Carte's Comedy Opera Company at the Opera Comique in 1877 as a chorus member and understudy to Mrs Howard Paul in the role of Lady Sangazure in the original production of The Sorcerer, performing the role briefly in December of that year. Carte considered her real name unsuitable for a stage career: the name Brandram was picked from a Post Office director. She played Lady Sangazure on a provincial tour in 1878, and the next year deputised at the Opera Comique as Little Buttercup in H.M.S. Pinafore in August 1879. At the end of 1879 she was a member of the D'Oyly Carte Opera Company touring company that W. S. Gilbert, Arthur Sullivan and Carte took to New York, where she created the role of Kate in The Pirates of Penzance. She toured with Carte's companies in America as Kate (and possibly, at times, as Edith and Ruth) in Pirates. She also appeared as Little Buttercup.

Later in 1880, on her return to England, she played Kate during the London run of Pirates at the Opera Comique. During the original production of Patience (1881–82), she was given the leading roles in two one-act companion pieces: Margery Daw in Uncle Samuel and Mrs. Bowcher in Mock Turtles. She also occasionally substituted for Alice Barnett as Lady Jane in Patience. While the next opera, Iolanthe (1882–84), played at the company's new home, the Savoy Theatre, she continued to take roles in the curtain raisers, repeating as Mrs Bowcher and then as Mrs Frumpington in A Private Wire. In September 1883, she replaced an unwell Jessie Bond as Iolanthe. Rutland Barrington wrote of her in his 1908 memoir, "I have never heard a contralto singer who gave me so much pleasure as Rosina; she sang without any effort, and her voice had a fullness and mellifluous quality which were unrivalled."

=== Principal contralto ===
As Blanche in Princess Ida

From 1884 to 1901, Brandram created the principal contralto roles in every Sullivan opera at the Savoy, the only principal to achieve that distinction. The first of these was Lady Blanche in Princess Ida (1884). In the first London revival of The Sorcerer (1884) she played Lady Sangazure. She next originated the roles of Katisha in The Mikado (1885–87) and Dame Hannah in Ruddigore (1887). She played Little Buttercup, Ruth and Katisha, respectively, in the first London revivals of Pinafore (1887), Pirates and The Mikado (both in 1888). She next created the roles of Dame Carruthers in The Yeomen of the Guard (1888) and the Duchess of Plaza-Toro in The Gondoliers (1889). Also in 1889, she appeared in one-off performances of two new operettas: in May she was in Newport by Robert Goldbeck, with Sybil Grey and other members of the Savoy company, and in June she starred with Courtice Pounds in a single performance of Tobacco Jars, by Lady Monckton and Harriet Young. She toured as the Duchess briefly in 1890 before returning to the Savoy to complete the run of The Gondoliers.

Brandram had no role in The Nautch Girl at the Savoy, but she appeared as Widow Jackson in the curtain-raiser, Captain Billy (1891–92). She played Widow Merton in the revival of Grundy and Solomon's The Vicar of Bray at the Savoy (1892). She then originated the roles of Lady Vernon in Sullivan's Haddon Hall (1892), Miss Sims in Jane Annie (1893), Lady Sophy in Utopia Limited (1893), the Marquise de Montigny in Mirette (1894), and Inez de Roxas in The Chieftain (1894, touring in this role in 1895), during the run of which Sullivan composed a new "characteristically Spanish" song expressly for her. A revival of The Mikado followed in 1895, in which she played Katisha. In Gilbert and Sullivan's last opera, The Grand Duke (1896), she created the role of Baroness von Krakenfeldt, followed by another Katisha in 1896.

Next, Brandram played Dame Carruthers in the first revival of Yeomen in 1897, and in 1898, she played the Duchess of Plaza Toro in the first revival of The Gondoliers. She was the original Joan in The Beauty Stone (1898) and reprised Lady Sangazure in The Sorcerer (1898), followed by Little Buttercup in Pinafore in 1899. She then created the role of Dancing Sunbeam in The Rose of Persia (1899–1900), after which she appeared as Ruth and Lady Jane in revivals of Pirates (1900) and Patience (1900–01). In Sullivan's last opera, The Emerald Isle, later in 1901, she originated the role of the Countess of Newtown. Following this, she created the role of Wee-Ping in the original version of The Willow Pattern, which ran briefly during November 1901. She then appeared in a revival of Iolanthe as the Queen of the Fairies, thus becoming the only singer to appear in all of Sullivan's works at the Savoy, except for Trial by Jury and Cox and Box, which have no contralto parts. At Richard D'Oyly Carte's death in 1901 she was left £1000 in his will as recognition of her loyal service.

Two original works by Edward German and Basil Hood followed, in which Brandram created the roles of Queen Elizabeth I in Merrie England (1902–03) and Nell Reddish in A Princess of Kensington (1903). She then toured in A Princess of Kensington for a few months, when the company disbanded. This was Brandram's last production with D'Oyly Carte.

Some of Brandram's roles

Ruth in The Pirates of Penzance

Lady Jane in Patience

Fairy Queen in Iolanthe

Katisha in The Mikado

Dame Carruthers in The Yeomen of the Guard

The Baroness in The Grand Duke

=== Later years and last illness ===
Brandram's final role: Ermerance de Champ d'Azur, in Véronique, with George Graves, 1904

In 1903 Brandram appeared at the Adelphi Theatre as the Sea Witch and the Queen in Hood and Walter Slaughter's fairy pantomime, Little Hans Andersen, together with former Savoy colleagues including Richard Temple, Walter Passmore and Henry Lytton. The following year, she appeared with Ruth Vincent at the Apollo Theatre as Ermerance de Champ d'Azur, in Véronique. In September of that year, she sustained injuries in a carriage accident and in December 1904, her health obliged her to leave the cast.

In her final years, suffering from pulmonary disease, Brandram was too ill to attend the dinner in December 1906 at the O.P. Club celebrating the first London repertory season of the Gilbert and Sullivan operas, at which she had been scheduled to speak, along with George Grossmith and Rutland Barrington. In his remarks on that occasion, W. S. Gilbert gave this tribute to Brandram: "Rosina of the glorious voice that rolled out as full-bodied Burgundy rolls down – Rosina whose dismal doom it was to represent undesirable old ladies of 65, but who, with all the resources of the perruquier and the make-up box, could never succeed in looking more than an attractive eight-and-twenty – it was her only failure."

In June 1906 Brandram moved to the seaside town of Southend-on-Sea, Essex, for the good of her health. In February 1907 The Times reported that though she had recovered from a dangerous attack of bronchitis, she was critically ill with heart trouble. She died in Southend the following month, aged 61.

== Notes, references and sources ==
=== Sources ===
- Ainger, Michael (2002). Gilbert and Sullivan – A Dual Biography. Oxford: Oxford University Press. ISBN 978-0-19-514769-8.
- Ayre, Leslie (1972). The Gilbert & Sullivan Companion. London: W. H. Allen. ISBN 978-0-491-00832-7.
- Baily, Leslie (1956). The Gilbert & Sullivan Book (fourth ed.). London: Cassell & Company Ltd. OCLC 254534938.
- Barrington, Rutland (1908). Rutland Barrington: A Record of 35 Years' Experience on the English Stage. London: G. Richards. OCLC 905855307.
- Rollins, Cyril; R. John Witts (1962). The D'Oyly Carte Opera Company in Gilbert and Sullivan Operas: A Record of Productions, 1875–1961. London: Michael Joseph. OCLC 504581419.
