= Mr. Jericho =

Programme, 1893

Mr. Jericho is a comic opera in one act with words by Harry Greenbank and music by Ernest Ford.

The work was first performed at the Savoy Theatre, London, on 18 March 1893 as a curtain raiser to Arthur Sullivan's Haddon Hall in March and April 1893, and to Ford's Jane Annie in June and July 1893, for a total of 45 performances.

A production of the work was given by Glimmerglass Opera in 1989. A recording (omitting the spoken dialogue) was issued by Dutton Epoch in 2020 together with the first professional recording of Haddon Hall, featuring the BBC Singers and BBC Concert Orchestra, conducted by John Andrews.

== Background ==
When the Gilbert and Sullivan partnership disbanded after the production of The Gondoliers in 1889, impresario Richard D'Oyly Carte needed new works to fill the Savoy Theatre. He asked Sullivan to write additional operas, and one of these was Haddon Hall. The fashion in the late Victorian era was to present long evenings in the theatre, and so producer Richard D'Oyly Carte preceded his Savoy operas with curtain raisers. W. J. MacQueen-Pope commented, concerning such curtain raisers:

This was a one-act play, seen only by the early comers. It would play to empty boxes, half-empty upper circle, to a gradually filling stalls and dress circle, but to an attentive, grateful and appreciative pit and gallery. Often these plays were little gems. They deserved much better treatment than they got, but those who saw them delighted in them. ... [They] served to give young actors and actresses a chance to win their spurs ... the stalls and the boxes lost much by missing the curtain-raiser, but to them dinner was more important.

Mr. Jericho was successful enough as a curtain raiser to Haddon Hall that it was selected again to precede Jane Annie. To create the piece, Carte had selected a composer that he knew could get the job done: Ford had studied under Arthur Sullivan and written several operas up to that point. Greenbank was also a known quantity, having supplied the theatre with another curtain raiser, Captain Billy. Greenbank also collaborated on A Gaiety Girl in 1893, a piece that would become a hit and establish his reputation.

== Roles and cast ==
- Michael de Vere, Earl of Margate – George de Pledge and later W.H. Leon
- Horace Alexander de Vere, Viscount Ramsgate (An Omnibus Driver) – Bates Maddison and later Sidwell Jones
- Mr. Jericho (A Jam Manufacturer) – J. Bowden Haswell
- Lady Bushey – Agnes Scott
- Winifred (Her Daughter) – Florence Easton and later Edith Farrow

Note: Edith Farrow began playing the role of Winifred in April when Easton took over the role of Dorothy in Haddon Hall. The other two cast changes occurred when the piece played with Jane Annie.

== Musical numbers ==
- No. 1. When Sunny Summer Ripens Corn – Horace
- No. 2. My Heart Goes Pit-a-Pat – Winifred and Horace
- No. 3. My Smelling Salts Get – Winifred, Lady Bushey and Horace
- No. 4. Jericho's Jams – Mr. Jericho
- No. 5. There Came to Maiden Innocence – Lady Bushey and Mr. Jericho
- No. 6. Who, Alas! Would Be A Peer? – Quintet
- No. 7. Soon There Shall Ring (Finale) – Company

== Synopsis ==
Michael de Vere, the Earl of Margate, has squandered his money, and so he lives in a small cottage and must do his own gardening, while his son Horace, Viscount Ramsgate, is reduced to working incognito as an omnibus driver. After he crashes his bus one day, he and his father commiserate over their troubles. Horace believes that he will never be able to win the love of Winifred, Lady Bushey's daughter, one of his regular passengers. Winifred arrives at the cottage and reveals to Horace that she loves him too. Lady Bushey appears and, seeing the humble cottage, is appalled that Winifred loves "a commoner", although she acknowledges Horace's good looks. She drags Winifred away, and Horace is heartbroken.

A world-famous jam manufacturer, Mr. Jericho, shows up looking for a lady friend whom he hasn't seen for a long time. Horace tells him that his father is very fond of Jericho's Jams. Jericho offers to pay Horace's father handsomely for this customer testimonial, to use it in advertising the jams. Jericho's lady friend turns out to be Lady Bushey. Now it is Winifred's turn to be appalled. Jericho encourages Lady Bushey to look favourably upon the romance of Horace and Winifred, but Lady Bushey repeats that her daughter must marry a peer. When they meet, Jericho recognizes the Earl and is delighted to offer him a generous allowance in return for his statement about his love for the jam. Jericho also suggests that Horace become a partner in the jam firm, giving Horace the financial means to marry Winifred, and all ends happily as Jericho and Lady Bushey come to a very satisfactory arrangement.

== See also ==
Savoy Opera
