= Captain Billy =

Comic opera

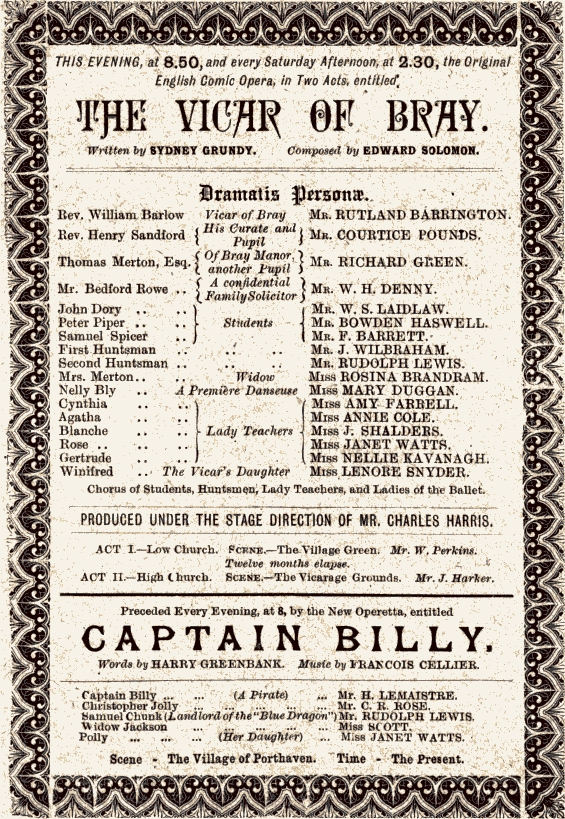
Savoy Theatre programme for double bill of Captain Billy and The Vicar of Bray

Captain Billy is a one-act comic opera with a libretto by Harry Greenbank and music by François Cellier. It was first performed at the Savoy Theatre on 24 September 1891 until 16 January 1892, as a curtain raiser to The Nautch Girl, and from 1 February 1892 to 18 June 1892, as a curtain raiser to The Vicar of Bray, for a total of 217 performances.

The first stage production with an orchestra for over 100 years was done in May 2007 by the Chapel End Savoy Players at the Deaton Theatre, Forest School, Snaresbrook, London as a curtain raiser for their production of The Pirates of Penzance.

The vocal score was published by Chappells and is in the British Library. There is no printed libretto. A copy of the libretto was filed in the Lord Chamberlain's collection in January/February 1880. A recording of an abridged version was made by a Leicester (UK) G&S Society in the 1970s. A recording (omitting the spoken dialogue) was issued by Dutton Epoch in 2020, together with Haddon Hall and Mr. Jericho, The recording features the BBC Singers and BBC Concert Orchestra, conducted by John Andrews.

== Background ==
When the Gilbert and Sullivan partnership disbanded after the production of The Gondoliers in 1889, impresario Richard D'Oyly Carte needed new works to fill the Savoy Theatre. The first of these was The Nautch Girl. The fashion in the late Victorian era was to present long evenings in the theatre, and so producer Richard D'Oyly Carte preceded his Savoy operas with curtain raisers. W. J. MacQueen-Pope commented, concerning such curtain raisers:

This was a one-act play, seen only by the early comers. It would play to empty boxes, half-empty upper circle, to a gradually filling stalls and dress circle, but to an attentive, grateful and appreciative pit and gallery. Often these plays were little gems. They deserved much better treatment than they got, but those who saw them delighted in them. … [They] served to give young actors and actresses a chance to win their spurs … the stalls and the boxes lost much by missing the curtain-raiser, but to them dinner was more important.

To create a curtain raiser for The Nautch Girl, Carte turned to Cellier, who was the long-time music director of the Savoy Theatre and had produced other works for Carte. Greenbank, on the other hand, was a new writer who would go on to a very productive and successful career writing lyrics for hit musicals, although he lived to the age of only 33.

== Synopsis ==
Captain Billy has been absent from Porthaven, his native village, for many years. His relatives do not know that he has been pursuing a very successful career as a pirate. A young foundling, Christopher Jolly, visits the village to examine the parish register in an attempt to find his birth certificate; he does not know his own age. Jolly falls in love with Polly, and they exchange this dialogue:

JOLLY: I love you. … But until that certificate is forthcoming, we can never be married. … My darling, you surely would not marry a man whose age you did not know?

POLLY: Oh, Christopher, my precious, your personal appearance pleases me very much! Why should I trouble about your age?

JOLLY: … How would you feel if the certificate were found, and showed that you had married a man old enough to be your grandfather? Or, possibly, I might turn out to be years younger than you are. Would you like to have it said that you had entrapped a mere boy into marriage? … I like to think that I am young; it gives me so much longer to find the certificate in.

Billy returns to the village on the same day and is recognised by his brother Samuel Chunk. Billy is reunited with his wife, who is surprised to discover that she is not a widow after all, and Jolly discovers that he is Billy's nephew, whom the old scoundrel had "lost" in the Sahara Desert many years before. Billy attests to Jolly's age, so that he can wed Polly. Billy becomes a respectable soap salesman.

== Musical numbers ==
- No. 1 – Christopher Jolly – "Oh! it isn't very nice when you fail …"
- No. 2 – Christopher and Polly – "When flowers blossom in the spring …"
- No. 3 – Quartett and dance: Widow Jackson, Polly, Christopher and Chunk – "With beating heart I wait to see …"
- No. 4 – Captain Billy, with Samuel Chunk – "A pirate bold am I …"
- No. 5 – Widow Jackson – "I thought my dashing buccaneer …"
- No. 6 – Polly, Widow Jackson, Christopher and Captain Billy – "It's unpleasant, mia cara …"
- No. 7 – Finale – "By fate released at last …"

== Cast information ==
The original cast was as follows:

- Captain Billy, a pirate (baritone). Helier Lemaistre
- Christopher Jolly (tenor). C.R. Rose
- Samuel Chunk (baritone). Rudolph Lewis
- Widow Jackson (contralto). Rosina Brandram
- Polly, her daughter (soprano). Decima Moore (later Florence Easton)

== See also ==
Savoy opera
