= An Old Jew =

1894 play by Sydney Grundy

An Old Jew is an 1894 play by the British writer Sydney Grundy. It opened at the Garrick Theatre in London on 6 January 1894 with its original run ending less than a month later on 3 February. The play was written for one of the leading actor-manager's of the era John Hare. The play was revived on several occasions, beginning the following year at the Coronet Theatre under the alternative title of Julius Sterne, the name of the main character. Gerald du Maurier a future stage star, made his debut in the play with a very small role.

It was the most sympathetic play to the Jewish community by a non-Jew since Richard Cumberland's The Jew exactly a century earlier. This was widely recognised by Jewish intellectuals of the era.

== Bibliography ==
- Nahshon, Edna. Jewish Theatre: A Global View. BRILL, 2009.
