= Ernest Ford =

British composer and conductor (1858–1919)

Ernest Ford, an 1895 portrait

Albert Ernest Alsor Clair Ford (17 February 1858 – 2 June 1919) was an English composer of operas and ballet music and a conductor.

== Life and career ==
Ford was born in Warminster, Wiltshire, England, the son of Edward Ford, the vestry clerk and organist there. From 1868 to 1873, he sang in the chorus at Salisbury Cathedral. He studied under Arthur Sullivan at the Royal Academy of Music in London, where, in 1875, he received the first Goss Scholarship. Ford studied in Paris under Édouard Lalo and also toured America. There, his motet, a setting of the Psalm Domine Deus, was performed at a celebration of the 250th anniversary of the founding of Harvard University. During the 1880s, Ford was the official accompanist at the Saturday Popular Concerts at St James's Hall, London. He also wrote a number of operas and operettas in the 1880s and early 1890s, including Daniel O' Rourke (1884); Nydia (a duologue by Justin H. M. Carthy, 1889); Joan (Robert Martin, 1890); and Weatherwise (1893).

Ford became the assistant musical director for the D'Oyly Carte Opera Company at the Savoy Theatre in 1888, serving in this position for five years. In 1891, Ford and François Cellier conducted Sullivan's grand opera, Ivanhoe, which opened Richard D'Oyly Carte's Royal English Opera House. Ford also arranged the piano score for Ivanhoe. While serving as music director at the Savoy, Ford wrote the music for the one-act operetta Mr. Jericho, first performed there in March 1893 as a curtain-raiser for Sullivan's Haddon Hall. The piece has a libretto by Harry Greenbank. In May of the same year, Ford supplied the music for the full-length J. M. Barrie and Arthur Conan Doyle comic opera, Jane Annie, a flop that nevertheless toured until September of that year.

Later, Ford became musical director of the Trafalgar Theatre in London. There, he revised and rewrote the music for the comic opera The Wedding Eve. He also composed much of the music for ballets produced at the Empire Theatre between 1894 and 1897, including La Frolique, Brighton Pier, Faust and La Danse. He became conductor of the Royal Amateur Orchestral Society in 1897. Ford also composed a volume of settings of poems by Percy Bysshe Shelley, many other songs and chamber music, an Elegy for violin and orchestra and a cantata, The Eve of the Festa.

By 1911, Ford was teaching singing as a Professor of Music at the Guildhall School of Music, and beginning in 1916 he taught composition there.

As a writer, he published A Short History of Music in England (1912). In 1903 he contributed a chapter to H. Saxe Wyndham's biography of Sullivan, entitled "Sullivan as Composer."

Ford married Alice Maria Philp (born 1875) in 1896 at St. James' church in Muswell Hill. They had two daughters, Frances Lily Helen Dixon Ford (1897–1957) and Eileen Carlota Ford (born 1899). He died in Marylebone in London at the age of 61. In his will he left £976 8s 10d to his widow.

== See also ==
- Savoy Opera
- Gilbert and Sullivan
