= Decima Moore =

Singer and actress

Decima Moore

Lilian Decima, Lady Moore-Guggisberg, CBE (11 December 1871 – 18 February 1964), better known by her stage name Decima Moore, was an English singer and actress, known for her performances in soprano roles with the D'Oyly Carte Opera Company and in musical comedies. She was the youngest of ten siblings (hence, the name "Decima"). Her sister, actress Eva Moore, was the mother of actress Jill Esmond, the first wife of Laurence Olivier.

Moore made her stage debut starring as Casilda in the Gilbert and Sullivan hit The Gondoliers in 1889 at the age of 17 and stayed with the company for two years. She then starred in a variety of West End theatre plays and musical pieces over the next two years, joining the George Edwardes company to create the ingénue role of Rose Brierly in the hit Edwardian musical comedy A Gaiety Girl in 1893. After touring with Edwardes's company in musicals, she returned to England and light opera later playing the role of Scent of Lilies in The Rose of Persia (1899) and starring in Florodora (1900–01) and My Lady Molly (1903), among other West End shows.

In 1905, Moore married Major (later Brigadier General) Sir Frederick Gordon Guggisberg, moving with him to West Africa. Over the next decade, she frequently returned to England and also toured, mostly in legitimate theatre, as well as singing in concerts. In 1908, she was one of the founding members of the Actresses' Franchise League and became very active in the suffrage movement. Her last London stage appearance was in 1914. During World War I, Moore worked in France on behalf of British soldiers. In 1918 she was honoured with the CBE for her services to her country. Moore was active in charity work during her long retirement. She was the last surviving original creator of a Gilbert and Sullivan role.

== Life and career ==
Moore was born in Brighton, Sussex, the ninth daughter and tenth child of Edward Henry Moore, an analytical chemist, and his wife, Emily (née Strachan). Four of her sisters sang on the concert platform or the stage, including Jessie (1864–1910), Eva (1870–1955) and Bertha Moore.

She was educated at Miss Pringle's school and then Boswell House College, Brighton and sang in the church choir. After leaving school in 1887, she won the Victoria Scholarship to study singing at the Blackheath Conservatoire of Music. She then studied voice with Rose Hersee.

=== Early career and D'Oyly Carte years ===
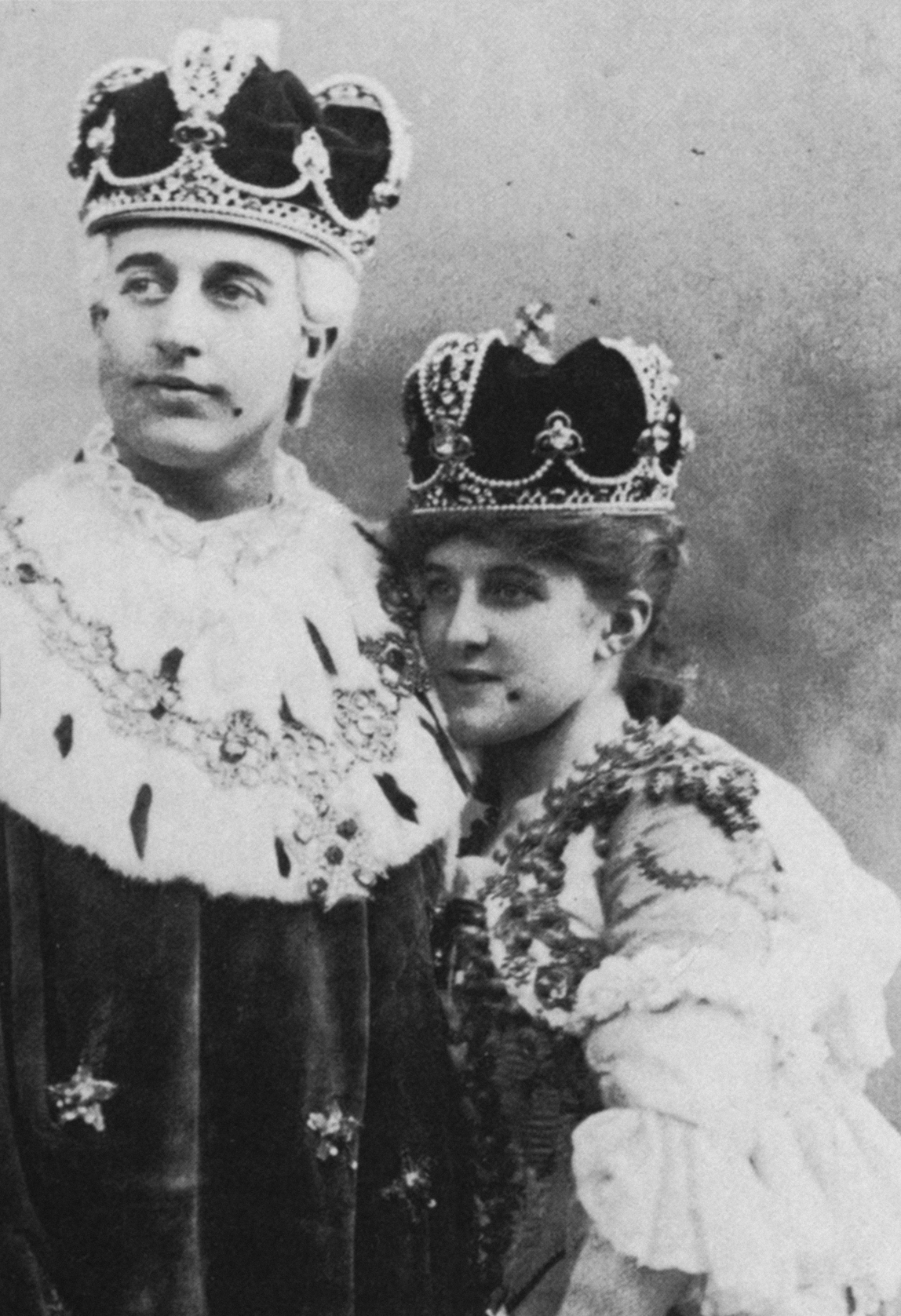
as Casilda in The Gondoliers

Moore intended to begin a concert career, but she made her debut at age 17 with the D'Oyly Carte Opera Company. There she created the leading role of Casilda in The Gondoliers, the last great Gilbert and Sullivan hit, which opened at the Savoy Theatre on 7 December 1889. W. S. Gilbert asked her if she had ever acted. When she replied in the negative, he replied, "So much the better; you'll have less to unlearn!" She related her first-night experience:

I had to make my first entrance in a gondola, with my back to the audience; and when I turned round to get out of it and faced the house my feelings were such that I shall never forget. I had only been to about three theatres in my life, and, of course, had never seen an audience in evening dress from the stage. When I did see that audience... I felt a "catch" in the chest as if I had fallen into an ice-cold bath and it had taken away all my breath. I stuck my finger nails into my palms and said, "This won't do!" and walked down the stage, trying to remember all I had been told to do and not to do. I got through the evening in a kind of dream, wept all the way home in the hansom, convinced I had been a failure.

In fact, Moore earned good reviews. The Times wrote that she "has a delightfully fresh voice... she sings with very good taste and gives distinct promise of becoming a very acceptable actress; her appearance is extremely taking, and on the whole, a more successful début has not recently taken place". Her next role was Polly in Captain Billy (1891), the companion piece to The Nautch Girl. Her older sister, Jessie Moore, who sang with one of D'Oyly Carte's touring companies, replaced Decima in Captain Billy in November 1891.

Moore left the Savoy when her commitment expired, starring in several West End Theatre pieces, including Miss Decima by Edmond Audran and F. C. Burnand (replacement cast, 1891–92), A Pantomime Rehearsal by Cecil Clay (1892 at the Royal Court Theatre), The Maelstrom (1892), Ophelia in Gilbert's Rosencrantz and Guildenstern (1892), The Wedding Eve (1892 at the Trafalgar Theatre), and the title role in a revival of B. C. Stephenson and Alfred Cellier's hit, Dorothy (1892–93). In 1893, Moore returned to the D'Oyly Carte organisation to create the role of Bab in the unsuccessful Jane Annie, with a libretto by J. M. Barrie and Arthur Conan Doyle and music by Ernest Ford.

Moore then left D'Oyly Carte again to appear in La fille de Madame Angot at the Criterion Theatre. Next, she created the ingénue role of Rose Brierly in A Gaiety Girl (1893–94), one of George Edwardes's hit musical comedies. In 1894, Edwardes sent Moore and the company to New York and then on tour in the U.S. The company was then sent to Australia, where she starred as Bessie Brent in the musical comedy, The Shop Girl, and later played the Prima Donna of the Ambiguity Theatre in In Town. While in Richmond, New York, in February 1896, still touring in A Gaiety Girl, Moore married a fellow cast member, Cecil Ainslie Walker-Leigh, an Anglo-Irish career officer in the British Army who served in the Boer War and World War I and retired with the rank of Colonel. To please her mother, they had a church wedding. They had a son in 1898, William Esmond Ormond Walker-Leigh, who eventually had a Navy career. Moore divorced her husband in 1901 at a time when divorce was still rare and considered dishonourable.

=== Later career and adventures ===
Back in England, Moore left Edwardes's company and returned to light opera. She starred in The White Silk Dress by A. McLean (1896) at the Prince of Wales Theatre and the British production of Lost, Strayed or Stolen (1897). She toured abroad extensively and played Lucia in Great Caesar, a Victorian burlesque by George Grossmith Jr. and Paul Rubens at the Comedy Theatre, in mid-1899. She returned to the D'Oyly Carte later in 1899, for the third and last time, to play Scent of Lilies in The Rose of Persia, after which she starred in the musical comedy Florodora (1900–01) at the Lyric Theatre. In 1901 Moore appeared in both A Diplomatic Theft at the Garrick Theatre, London and The Swineherd and the Princess at the Royalty Theatre. She toured in The Gay Cadets (1902). In 1903, she starred as Alice Coverdale in another success, My Lady Molly, at the Lyceum Theatre.

Moore in My Lady Molly

In 1905, Moore remarried and accompanied her second husband, Major (later Brigadier General Sir) Frederick Gordon Guggisberg, to West Africa. It was also his second marriage. An officer in the Royal Engineers, he was appointed director of surveys and later governor and Commander-in-Chief of the Gold Coast (now Ghana) and then British Guiana. In 1909, the two would jointly publish We Two in West Africa, an account of their life in the developing Gold Coast.

During her frequent trips to England, she continued to appear on stage. In 1906, she sang in the chorus of Trial by Jury in the Ellen Terry Golden Jubilee celebration matinee. Her stage appearances were mostly in legitimate theatre, such as W. Somerset Maugham's comedy, Mrs. Dot, with Dame Marie Tempest and Ben Jonson's The Vision of Delight, both in 1908. She played in his masque The Hue and Cry after Cupid in 1911. Moore toured America and Australia, as well as appearing throughout the British Isles and in concerts at major venues, such as Albert Hall and St. James's Hall, until 1914. Her last London stage appearance was in a matinée performance of Vantage Out in 1914.

In 1908 Moore was one of the founding members of the Actresses' Franchise League, which supported the women's suffrage movement through pro-suffrage propaganda plays, readings and lectures. She was also a member of the Actress' Freedom League. Moore was active in the suffrage movement (as was her sister Eva), sitting on boards, attending meetings, appearing in suffragist plays and films and often reciting the monologue Woman This And Woman That.

At the outbreak of World War I, Moore became employed in France in war work, while Guggisberg rejoined the army. Moore founded the Women's Emergency Corps, which organised women volunteers, and established several leave clubs, acting as director general of the British Navy, Army and Air Force Leave Club in Paris. After the armistice, in Cologne, she organised a club for the army of occupation. In 1918 she was made a Commander of the Most Excellent Order of the British Empire for her services and was awarded the overseas medal and the Médaillon de reconnaissance. While her husband was a colonial governor, she served her country as Honorary Exhibition Commissioner for the Gold Coast at the British Empire Exhibition (1923–26), was Chairman of The Play Actors (1927–29), and Chairman of the Overseas Section of the Forum Club (1928–32). During World War II in Paris, she reestablished the British Leave Club in 1939. She fled the city on 11 June 1940, only a few hours before the entry of the Germans, attaching a notice to the doors of the club: "Temporarily Closed".

Lady Moore-Guggisberg continued to perform charity work on behalf of veterans, women and others throughout her retirement. She also appeared in the film Nine Till Six (1931). Her husband died in 1930. She was elected vice-president of the Gilbert & Sullivan Society in 1960, when she was the last surviving creator of a Gilbert and Sullivan role.

== Death ==
Lady Moore-Guggisberg died in Kensington, London in 1964, aged 92.
