= W. H. Denny =

English singer and actor

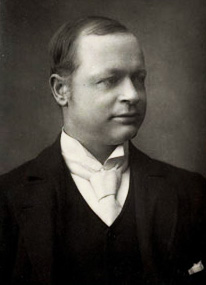
Denny in 1892

W. H. Denny (22 October 1853 – 31 August 1915) was an English singer and actor in comic operas, operettas and musical theatre. He is best remembered for his portrayal of baritone roles in the Savoy operas.

== Life and career ==
=== Early years ===
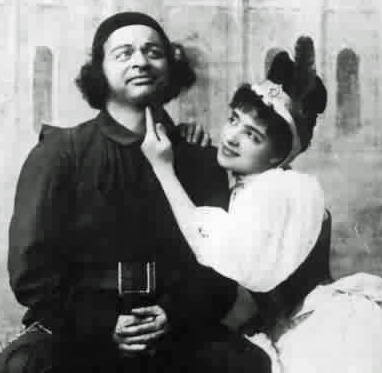
Denny with Jessie Bond in The Yeomen of the Guard, 1888

Denny was born William Henry Leigh Dugmore at Balsall Heath, Birmingham, England. His mother, Mrs. Henry Leigh, was the original Diana in Gilbert and Sullivan's first collaboration, Thespis (1871).

Denny appeared as the child in The Stranger in Worcester at the age of six. He played juvenile parts for several years, tackling his first adult role at the Theatre Royal, Dundee in 1870.

Denny's first role in London was at Sadler's Wells Theatre in an 1872 revival of Mazeppa, a dramatisation of Byron's poem based on a legend about Ivan Mazeppa. He played the role of Simple in 1874 in The Merry Wives of Windsor at the Gaiety Theatre, London. After a series of roles in Shakespeare plays and in works by H. J. Byron, he was engaged by Richard D'Oyly Carte in 1876 for a tour as Trenitz in La fille de Madame Angot, Barthel in The Duke's Daughter, and Tarapote in La Périchole. Denny then toured America for three years with Lydia Thompson, also appearing in Philadelphia under the management of Mrs. John Drew.

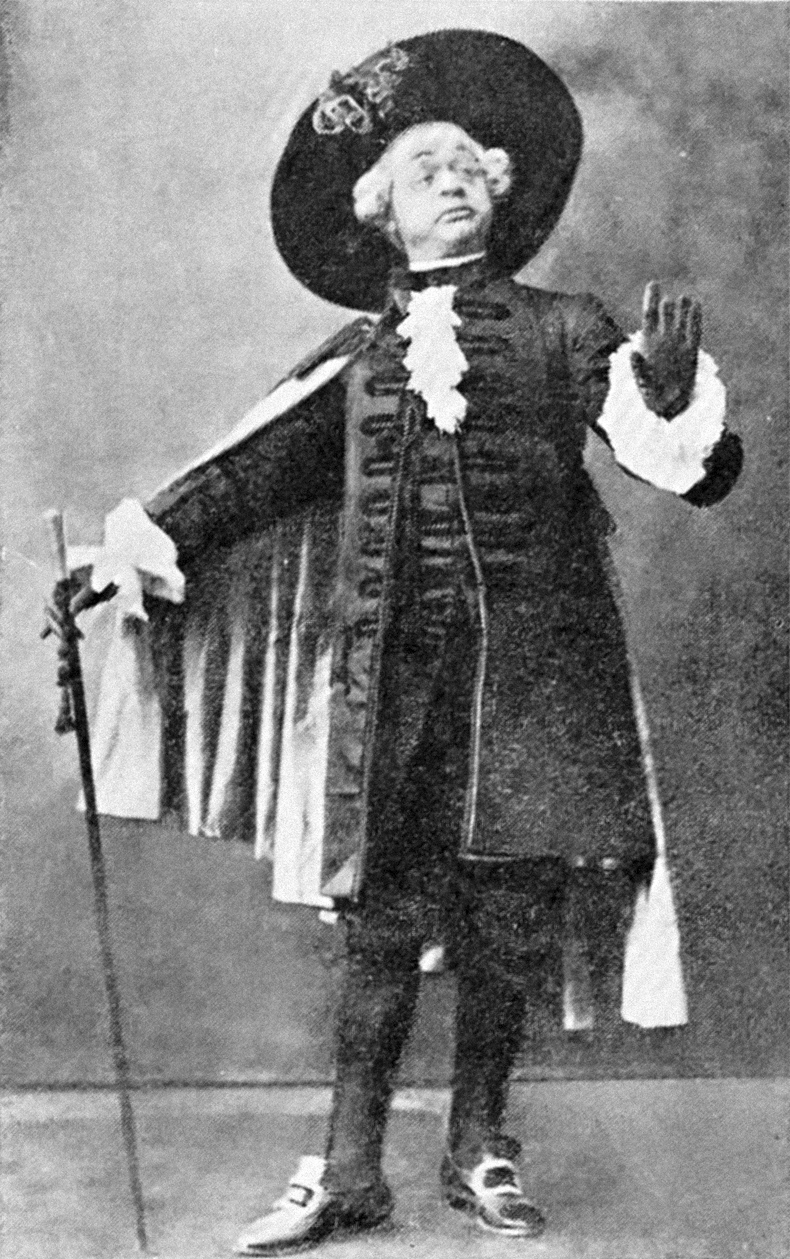
as The Grand Inquisitor in The Gondoliers

Returning to London in 1879, Denny appeared as Charles Freeman in Marie Litton's production of The Beaux' Stratagem, and in her subsequent productions, in a company including John Hare and the Kendals. He appeared in comic opera in an English version of Donizetti's La fille du régiment. At the Imperial Theatre, London, he played the role of Sir Charles in She Stoops to Conquer and Corporal Foss in The Poor Gentleman, both in 1879. The same year, he created the role of Filippo in Alfred Tennyson's Falcon, winning better notices than the play. Next, he created the role of Slater in William and Susan in 1880. He played Angus Macalister in an 1881 revival of W. S. Gilbert's Engaged, before going on tour with Lillie Langtry in 1882, playing roles including Tony Lumpkin in She Stoops to Conquer.

Denny was back in New York in 1884–85, and returned to the London stage in 1886–87. He created the role of Hamish in Hamilton's Harvest (1886) and the next year he made what The Theatre magazine called "an extraordinary hit" as Noah Topping in Pinero's Dandy Dick. While he was in the run of the latter, Arthur Sullivan saw him, and invited him to audition for the Savoy Theatre .

=== Savoy Theatre years ===
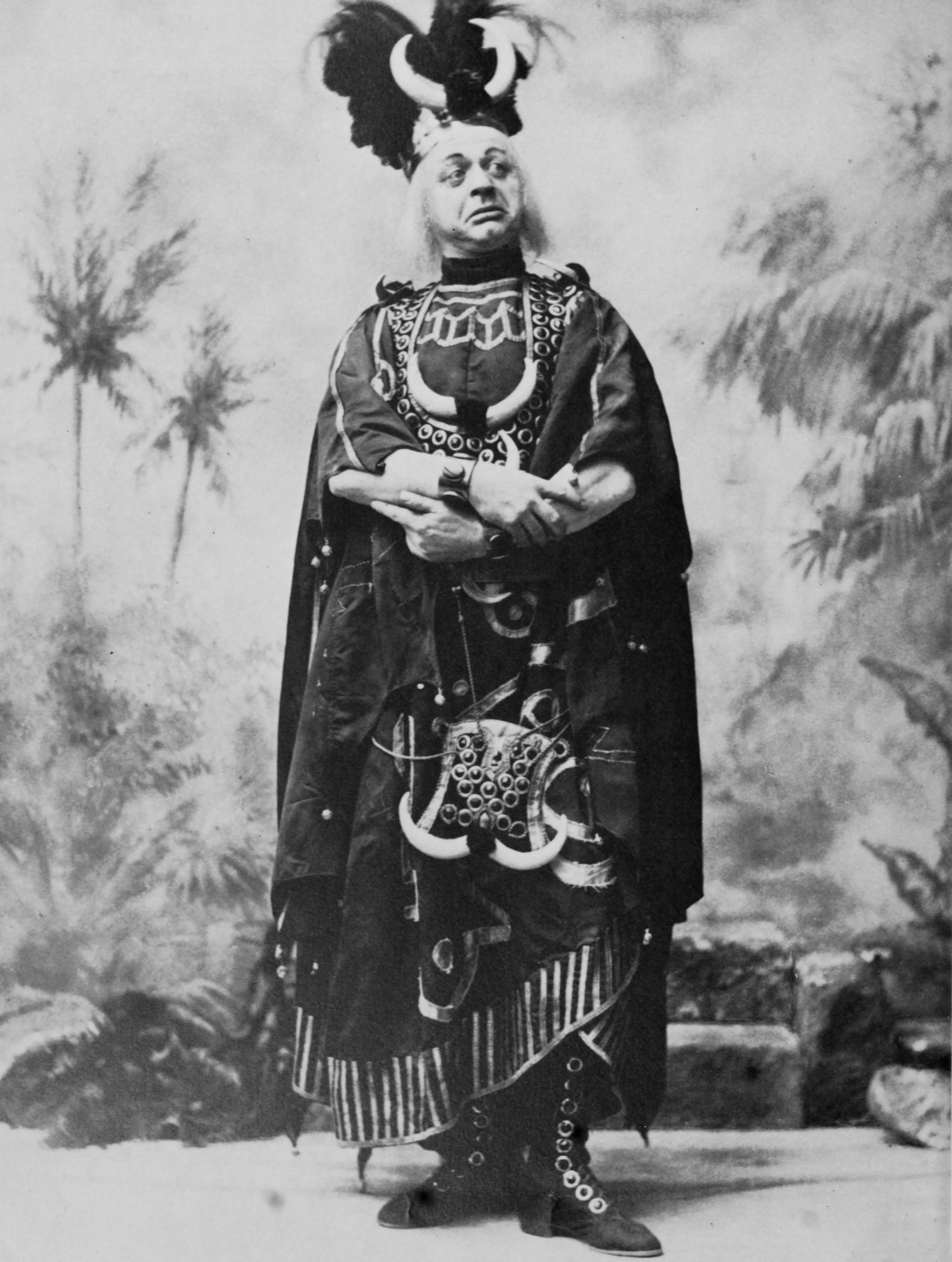
as Scaphio in Utopia, Limited

Denny joined the D'Oyly Carte Opera Company at the Savoy to replace Rutland Barrington in 1888 and remained there until 1893. He created the roles of Wilfred Shadbolt in The Yeomen of the Guard (1888), the Grand Inquisitor, Don Alhambra del Bolero, in The Gondoliers (1889) and Bumbo in The Nautch Girl (1891). He next played Bedford Rowe in the revival of The Vicar of Bray (1892), and he created the character of The McCrankie in Haddon Hall (1892), leaving the company when the run was completed. In 1893, he appeared in a musical comedy called Poor Jonathan before returning to D'Oyly Carte to create the part of Scaphio in Utopia, Limited (1893). He again left the company at the end of the run of that show.

=== Later years ===
After leaving the Savoy, Denny appeared again in musicals in London from 1895 to 1897. He created the roles of Pilkington Jones in Gentleman Joe (1895) and Robert White in Dandy Dan (1897). He later toured Australia and New Zealand in a Shakespeare company, playing Bottom and Touchstone. He was back on the New York stage beginning in 1905, appearing on Broadway in Julius Caesar (1902), The Proud Laird (a comedy, 1905), The Earl and the Girl (a musical, 1906), The Hypocrites (a drama, 1906), The Beauty Spot (a musical, 1909), The Gay Hussars (an operetta, 1909), Madame X (a melodrama, 1910), and The Blue Bird (a play, 1911). He once more returned to London, making his last appearance there as Stuff, a theatre manager, in Walter Browne's Everywoman in 1912.

Denny also wrote several one-act plays, the best-known of which was A Mutual Mistake (1891). In addition, he wrote song lyrics, such as "How sweet thou art to me" ("Sleep, gentle sleep"), with music by Arthur Weld (1909). Denny was one of the founders of the Actors' Orphanage, and he maintained an active interest in it. He married Georgina Pike. Their son, Reginald Denny, became a popular film actor.

Denny died in Herne Bay, Kent in 1915 at the age of 61.

== Notes ==
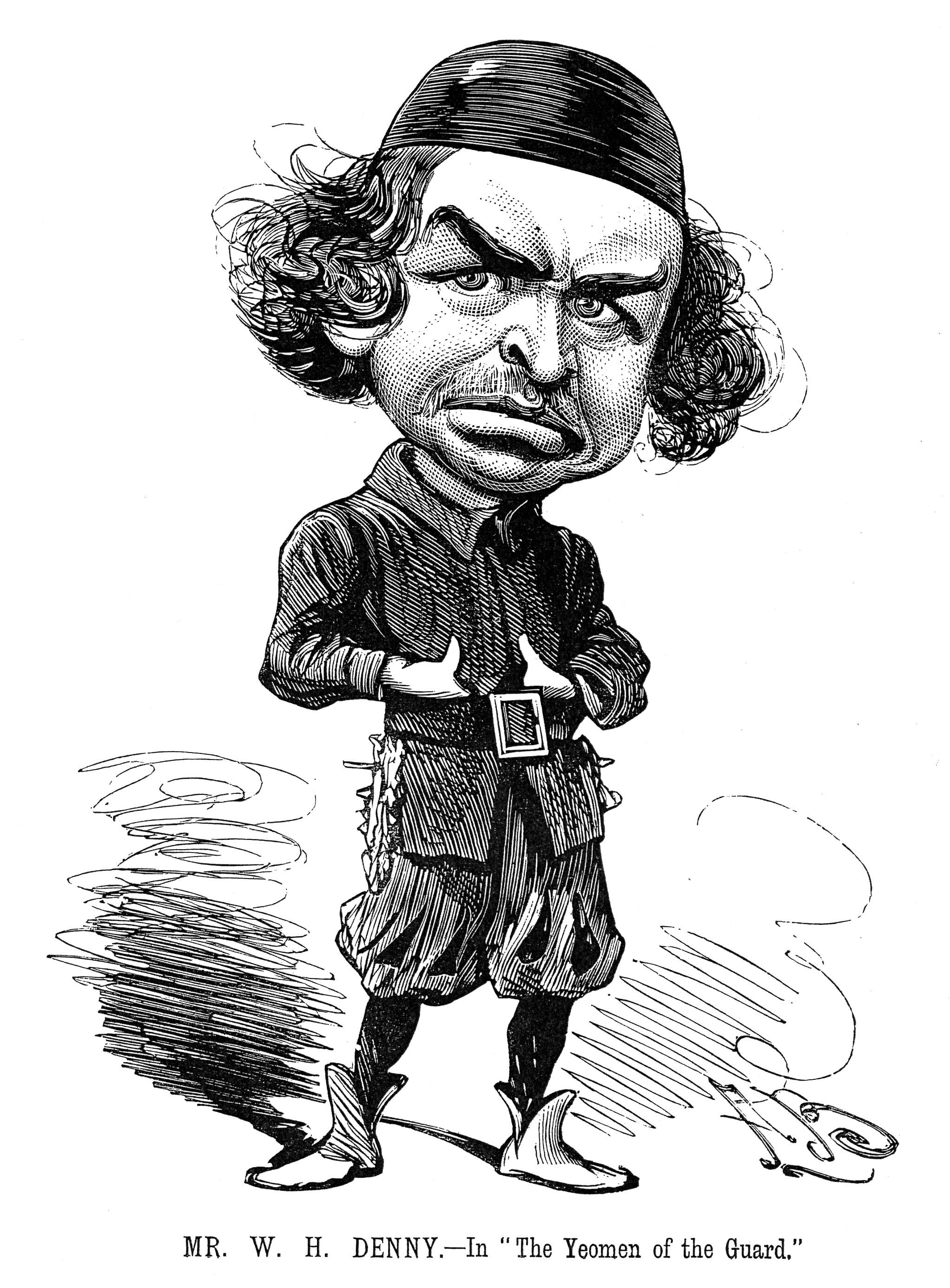
Caricature of Denny in The Yeomen of the Guard
