= Edna Nahshon =

Professor of Jewish theater and drama

Edna Nahshon is professor of Jewish theater and drama at the Jewish Theological Seminary of America. Her interests include Yiddish and Israeli theater and drama. She is also a senior fellow at Oxford University's Centre for Hebrew and Jewish Studies.

== Books ==
- Wrestling with Shylock: Jewish Responses to “The Merchant of Venice.” Cambridge University Press, 2016/17.
- New York's Yiddish Theater: From the Bowery to Broadway. New York: Columbia University Press, 2016
- (editor and contributor) Jews and Theater in an Intercultural Context. Editor and contributor. Leiden and Boston: Brill Academic Publishers, 2012.
- (editor and contributor) Jewish Theatre: A Global View. Editor and contributor. Leiden and Boston: Brill Academic Publishers, 2009.
- Jews and Shoes. Oxford, UK: Berg, 2008.
  - From the book jacket: "Jews and Shoes takes a fresh look at the makings and meanings of shoes, cobblers, and barefootedness in Jewish experience. The book shows how shoes convey theological, social, and economic concepts, and as such are intriguing subjects for inquiry within a wide range of cultural, artistic, and historic contexts."
- From the Ghetto to the Melting Pot: Israel Zangwill's Jewish Plays. Detroit: Wayne State University Press, 2005.
- Yiddish Proletarian Theatre: The Art and Politics of the Artef, 1925–1940. Westwood, CT: Greenwood, 1998.
- She also contributed chapters for several books on Jewish theatre.

== Awards ==
- 2016 George Freedley Award Special Jury Prize "for an exemplary work in the field of live theatre or performance". for New York’s Yiddish Theater.
- Jordan Schnitzer Book Award Committee of the Association for Jewish Studies as a 2009 Notable Selection in the category of Jews and the Arts for From the Ghetto to the Melting Pot.
