= Sydney Grundy =

English dramatist

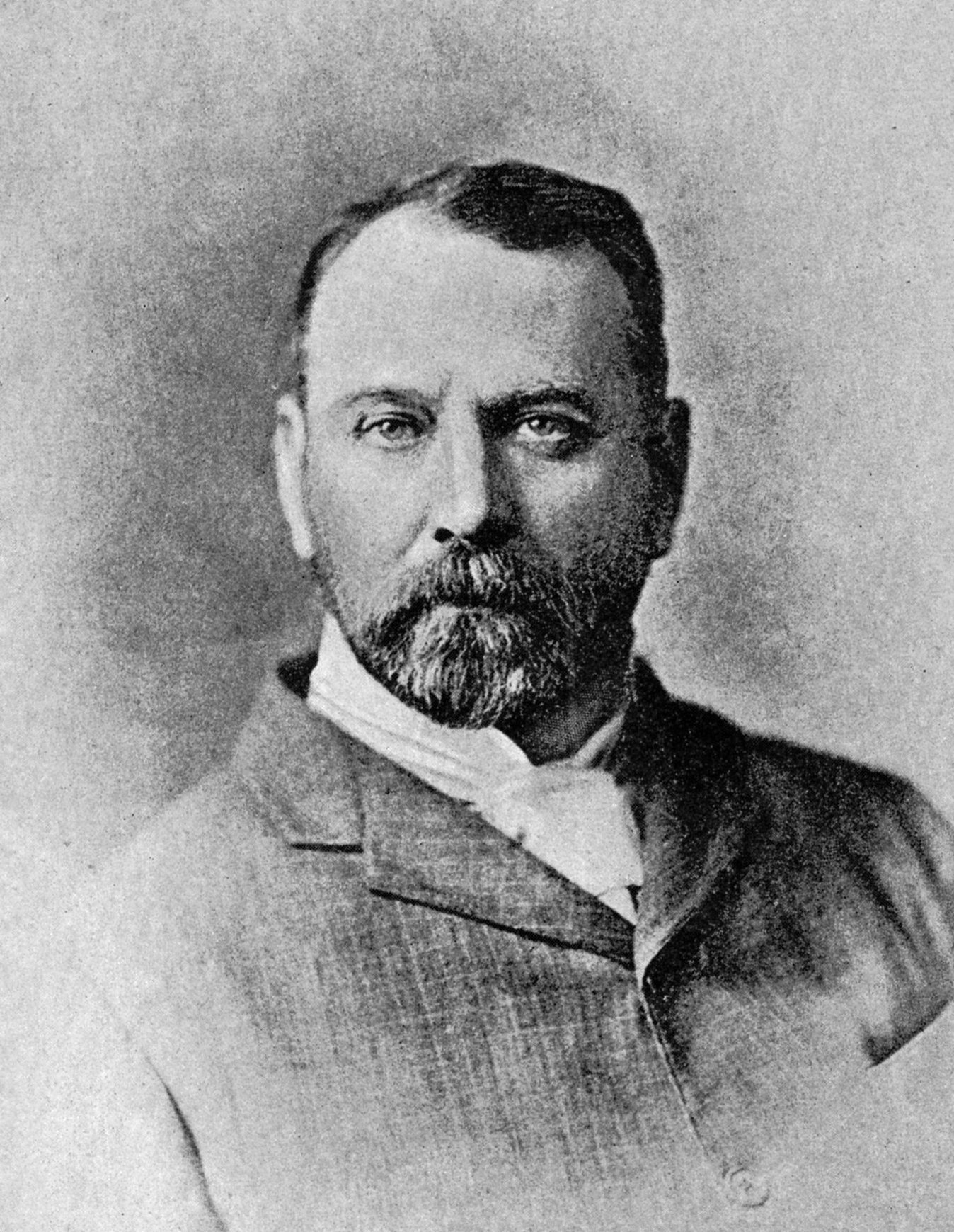
Sydney Grundy, 1894

Sydney Grundy (23 March 1848 – 4 July 1914) was an English dramatist. Most of his works were adaptations of European plays, and many became successful enough to tour throughout the English-speaking world. He is, however, perhaps best remembered today as the librettist of several comic operas, notably Haddon Hall.

== Life and career ==
Grundy was born in Manchester, England, the son of Alderman Charles Sydney Grundy. He was educated at Owens College, Manchester, and studied law at the Middle Temple. He was called to the bar in 1869 and practised law until 1876.

=== Early career ===
His early one-act farce, A Little Change, was produced at the Haymarket Theatre in 1872 by the Kendals. This was followed by All at Sea in 1873, also starring the Kendals. In 1876, Grundy published The Days of His Vanity. He wrote Mammon for W. H. Vernon at the Strand Theatre in 1877 and After Long Years for the Folly Theatre in 1879. Early comedies included The Glass of Fashion (1883), The Silver Shield (1885), and the blank verse Clito for Wilson Barrett (1886).

Scene from Grundy and Sullivan's Haddon Hall

Grundy became well known as an adapter of French and German plays, cleaning them up for British audiences and revisiting the source material to craft his final product. As the protagonist in his 1900 play, A Debt of Honour, explains: "It all takes place in Paris: nobody pretends that such things happen here." Among his earlier successes at adapting European works were The Snowball at the Strand Theatre (1879), based on Oscar, ou le mari qui trompe sa femme by Eugène Scribe and Duvergne; In Honour Bound (1880), based on Scribe's Une Chaine; Dust at the Royalty Theatre (1881); The Glass of Fashion (1883); and A Wife's Sacrifice (1886). The Bells of Haslemere, written with H. Pettitt, was a success at the Adelphi Theatre in 1887. He also created a farce in three acts, The Arabian Nights (1887), an adaptation of von Moser's Haroun al Raschid; Pompadour, written with W. G. Wilts; and Mamma (1888), an adaptation of Les surprises du Divorce.

Grundy's original libretti included the one-act "musical absurdity" Popsy Wopsy (1880), the full-length operas The Vicar of Bray (1882) and Pocahontas (1884); all three with composer Edward Solomon. These Solomon and Grundy comic operas toured extensively in both Britain and the US. His Haddon Hall (1892), with Sir Arthur Sullivan, dramatised the legend of Dorothy Vernon's elopement from Haddon Hall with John Manners.

=== Later years ===
In 1889–90 Grundy produced three original comedies, A White Lie at the Court Theatre, A Wife's Sacrifice and A Fool's Paradise at the Gaiety Theatre, which had been produced two years earlier as The Mouse-Trap.

Later successful adaptations included A Pair of Spectacles at the Garrick Theatre (1889), from Les Petits Oiseaux of Labiche and Delacour. In 1890, Lilly Langtry presented Grundy's Esther Sandraz at the St. James's Theatre. This was followed by A Village Priest at the Haymarket Theatre (1890), from Le Secret de la terreuse (called The Broken Seal in America) a melodrama by Busnach and Cauvin; Sowing the Wind at the Comedy Theatre (1893); An Old Jew at the Garrick (1894); an adaptation of Octave Feuillet's Montjoye, called A Bunch of Violets at the Haymarket (1894); The New Woman (1894) at the Comedy Theatre; The Slaves of the Ring (1894); and The Greatest of These at the Garrick with the Kendals (1895).

Other late notable works included The Greatest of These (1895); A Marriage of Convenience at the Haymarket (1897) from Un Mariage de Louis XV, by Alexandre Dumas, père; The Silver Key at Her Majesty's Theatre (1897) from his Mlle de Belle-isle; and The Musqueteers (1899) from the same author's novel. These were followed by The Degenerates (1899, at the Haymarket, starring Langtry); A Debt of Honour at the St James's Theatre (1900); Frocks and Frills at the Haymarket (1902) from Doigts de fees of Scribe and Ernest Legouvé; The Garden of Lies at St James's (1904) from Justus Miles Forman's novel; Business is Business at His Majesty's (1905), a rather free adaptation from Octave Mirbeau's Les affaires sont les affaires; and The Diplomatists at the Royalty Theatre (1905) from La Poudre aux yeux, by Labiche.

About a dozen of Grundy's works played on Broadway, including A Pair of Spectacles in 1890 and 1905; The New Woman in 1894; A Bunch of Violets in 1895; The Late Mr. Castello in 1896; A Marriage of Convenience in 1897 and 1918; The Musketeers in 1899; The Degenerates in 1900; The Love Match in 1901; Frocks and Frills in 1902; Gypsy in 1903 and The Awakening in 1908. Several of Grundy's plays were made into films, including A Bunch of Violets and A Pair of Spectacles, both in 1916; and Sowing the Wind in 1921. Many of Grundy's plays also had runs in Australia.

Grundy died in London at the age of 66. His daughter, Lily, married the publisher and philanthropist Sir Bruce Ingram.
