= Jane Annie =

1893 comic opera by Ford, Barrie and Conan Doyle

Cover of programme, 1893

Jane Annie, or The Good Conduct Prize is a comic opera written in 1893 by J. M. Barrie and Arthur Conan Doyle, with music by Ernest Ford, a conductor and occasional composer.

When the Gilbert and Sullivan partnership disbanded after the production of The Gondoliers in 1889, impresario Richard D'Oyly Carte was forced to find new works to present at the Savoy Theatre. Barrie was then a journalist and a novelist with a few popular books to his credit. He had not yet created his classic Peter Pan, and his only stage productions included a biography that closed after one night, a parody of new-to-London Henrik Ibsen, and in 1892 his first real success, Walker, London for Toole's Theatre.

Barrie brought his idea for Jane Annie to D'Oyly Carte, who suggested that Arthur Sullivan collaborate with him, but Sullivan suggested his former pupil Ford, instead. Ford had composed several operettas, including the one-act Mr. Jericho (premiered at the Savoy in 1893). Barrie could not finish the libretto. He persuaded his friend Conan Doyle – already popular for his Sherlock Holmes mysteries – to work on it. Conan Doyle finished the piece but was constrained by Barrie's work.

== Productions ==
Jane Annie premiered at the Savoy Theatre, London, on 13 May 1893 and was an immediate failure there. Barrie and Conan Doyle made revisions, but the piece closed after a run of only 50 performances, despite a strong cast that included such Savoy favourites as Rutland Barrington, Walter Passmore, Rosina Brandram, Emmie Owen, and Decima Moore. The opera was the Savoy Theatre's first real flop.

Jane Annie closed at the Savoy on 1 July 1893 and went on tour to Bradford, Newcastle, Manchester, and Birmingham, until 26 August 1893. The tour was far more successful than the show had been in London. Barrington, a lifelong golf enthusiast, speculated that one reason for the failure of Jane Annie in London was that the game of golf was not yet popular there. Jane Annie has not been professionally revived.

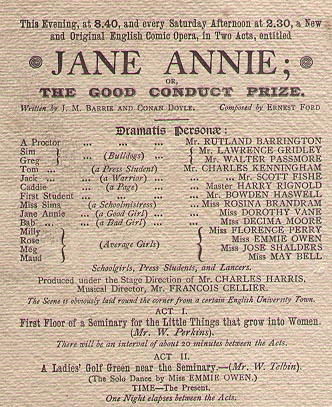
From programme, 1893

The Proctor explains his role and the bulldogs:

I'll tell to you what 'tis we do,
We stalk the undergrad.
When he perceives our velvet sleeves,
He runs away like mad.
Then follow we by deputy,
These men I now describe;
My bulldogs sound pull him to ground,
They never take a bribe.

== Roles and original cast ==
- The Proctor, in love with Miss Sims (bass-baritone) - Rutland Barrington
- Sim, a bulldog (baritone) - Lawrence Grindley
- Greg, a bulldog (baritone) - Walter Passmore
- Tom, a press student (tenor) - Charles Kenningham
- Jack, a soldier (baritone) - R. Scott Fishe
- Caddie, a page (treble) - Harry Rignold
- First Student (non-singing) - Bowden Haswell
- Miss Sims, the headmistress (contralto) - Rosina Brandram
- Jane Annie, a good girl (mezzo-soprano) - Dorothy Vane
- Bab, a bad girl (soprano) - Decima Moore
- Milly, an average girl (soprano) - Florence Perry
- Rose, another (mezzo-soprano) - Emmie Owen
- Meg, another (non-singing) - José Shalders
- Maud, another (non-singing) - May Bell
- Chorus of Schoolgirls, Press Students and Lancers

Note on Terminology:

A proctor is a senior member of the university staff responsible for discipline, including assigning fines, as well as general administration. Bulldogs are the nickname of the university police, the officials who act on the proctor's behalf. A page is a young servant, usually in his teens, with responsibility for minor household tasks.

== Synopsis ==
Jane Annie is set at a girls' boarding school near a famous English university town (implied to be Oxford).

=== Act I: The first floor of "The Seminary for Little Things That Grow Into Women", Night. ===
The girls are bidding good night to each other when there is a knock at the front door. Miss Sims, the headmistress, shows three men into her study and plugs up the keyhole. Bab, a "bad girl", begins to tell the girls about a secret she has, but is interrupted by Jane Annie, the school's "good girl" tattletale, who promptly goes to tell Miss Sims what she heard. Bab hastily fills the other girls in on her plan to elope that night with Jack, a soldier. When Jane Annie returns with Miss Sims, Bab pretends her secret was how tired she was, and pretends to go to bed. Miss Sims introduces her guests as the Proctor and his bulldogs, who are at the school to capture a student who is "carrying on a flirtation". With the help of Miss Sims, after the girls retire for the night, the Proctor hides inside the grandfather clock, substituting his face for the clock face, and awaits his prey. Tom, a press (journalism) student from the university, enters through the window. He is another suitor of Bab's and meets with her, but she breaks off their relationship. The Proctor emerges from his hiding place and scares Tom back out the window. A moment later, a note is thrown through the window, and Bab suggests that it is from Miss Sims, who used to be the Proctor's sweetheart. As he departs, Jane Annie comes downstairs and lowers the lights, when Jack enters, in a cloak. He discovers he has addressed the wrong girl and drops the cloak as he runs.

Jane Annie disguises herself in the cloak and pretends to be Jack when Bab comes downstairs with her luggage. Bab faints into her arms, Jane Annie screams, and the whole house is alerted. The press students from the university, who have been following the Proctor to get a story out of him, are near enough to hear the scream, so they join the girls and Miss Sims in finding Bab in Jane Annie's arms, fainted from fright. Miss Sims sends the girls to their rooms (they remain on the balcony instead), and the Proctor enters furiously. The press students ambush him with an interview and they repeatedly misinterpret his statements and his attempted corrections, so he invents a story to avoid scandal. Greg and Sim announce that they caught someone - but he's not the undergraduate they were after. Jack appears, swearing revenge for false arrest, and Miss Sims decides to reward Jane Annie for foiling Bab's elopement. Jane Annie requests the Good Conduct Prize, and Miss Sims agrees. While Miss Sims is getting the prize, Jane Annie reveals that she has the powers of hypnotism, and, now that the Good Conduct Prize is safely hers, she is free to be as bad as she likes and will begin the very next day.

=== Act II: A golf course attached to the school. An arbour and small waterway visible. ===
The next day, which is the last day of the semester, Caddie, a young servant, is taking Bab out to the golf course to let her see what she is missing, since she is being punished by not being allowed to play. Jane Annie, in a moment alone with her, tells Bab that she has chosen one of Bab's suitors, Jack, for her lover, although she hasn't told him yet.

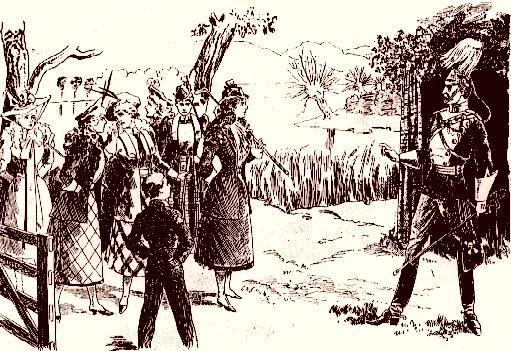
On the Golf Course

The girls enter, playing at the hole, and Miss Sims, hypnotised by Jane Annie, decides that some men may be admitted as part of their end-of-semester celebration. To liven things up further, she adds that the girls may assume the character of men. When she's alone with Jane Annie, Miss Sims says that she had the oddest dream of writing several letters that morning, which Caddie delivered. The result of letter one is quickly realised, when the press students arrive in cap and gown. They produce Miss Sims' letter, which she identifies as her writing. When the whiskey and soda arrive (letter number two!), Caddie smells a rat and threatens to tell on Jane Annie if he doesn't get a kiss from her.

The girls meet the press students, and since all the girls have decided to be men, the students become girls to oblige them. Just when the fun begins, the Proctor appears and scares off the real men. The girls continue their deception until the Proctor threatens to gate them all, and the girls drop their caps and gowns. Embarrassed, he fines himself a shilling, which Greg and Sim pay. Jack and the soldiers appear by Miss Sims' invitation, and more letters are revealed, to her annoyance. Jane Annie finds Jack and tells him that he will elope with her, something he'd rather not do. Tom and Jack meet face to face and insult each other's intelligence. They nonetheless prepare to run off together, but discover that Caddie has hidden the key to the boatshed. As they formulate their plan, Bab reconciles with Tom, finding Jack arrogant and too idealistic. The Proctor catches Bab in Tom's arms, but she uses her charms to weaken the Proctor's will. She eventually ties him up with her boa and locks him in the arbour.

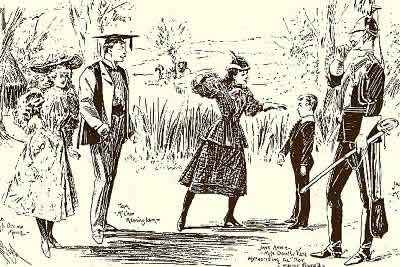
Jane Annie hypnotises Caddie

The carriage has arrived to take the lovers away, but they can't cross the river without the boat. Jane Annie hypnotises Caddie, who has hidden the key in an undisclosed location on his person. When he gives up the key, Miss Sims catches them. Jane Annie hypnotizes her into giving her blessing, and then she hypnotizes the Proctor into paying for their expenses. Jack refuses to accompany Jane Annie, so she hypnotizes him as well, and he agrees to love her. The happy couples escape, and when the spell is broken, Miss Sims and the Proctor realise that a joke has been played on them, and their reputations are ruined. The Proctor attempts to get a moral out of it, but since he can't recall it, he suggests "you'd best go home without it". Caddie would suggest that the moral is "no more Good Conduct prizes", but the others don't allow him get a word in on the matter.

== Critical and audience reception ==
At the opening night performance, the majority of the audience showed their disappointment. During the second act, Barrie and Doyle left their private box. Ford was applauded for his music, but the audience did not call for the authors. "Towards the end it became more and more apparent that the audience were getting rather bored, and the final verdict... was far from enthusiastic."

The critics generally condemned the opera, calling the authors to task for a boring story and criticising Ford for his highly derivative score. The Stage wrote that, "Dramatically, Jane Annie is simply a sketch of schoolgirl caprice and persistent waywardness". The paper lamented that the opera was funnier to read than to see on stage. The Times had a more favourable view of the piece. The cast and crew were praised by some critics for their efforts at working such unworthy parts. "However hard [Moore] worked, she remained thoroughly embarrassed by the whole thing. As curtain-calls were being taken, she refused to come out of her dressing-room, though pit and gallery shouted for her for five minutes; and when at length the piece was taken on tour, she absolutely refused to go with it."

== List of musical numbers ==
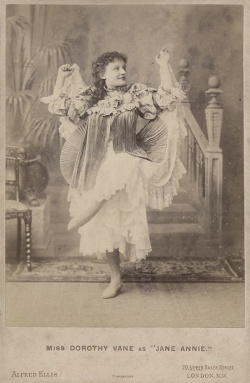
Postcard of Dorothy Vane as Jane Annie

- Introduction
- Act I
1. "Good night" (Milly and Girls)
2. "I'm not a sneak for praise or pelf" (Jane Annie and Girls)
3. "Bright-eyed Bab I used to be" (Bab, Miss Sims, Jane Annie and Girls)
4. "There was a time when we were not...Name and college!" (Proctor with Bab, Miss Sims, Jane Annie, Sim and Greg)
5. "Approach her thus" (Miss Sims, Proctor, Sim and Greg)
6. "When a bulldog I became" (Greg and Sim)
7. "It was the time of thistledown" (Tom)
8. "What are the gifts that love may bring?" (Bab, Tom and Proctor)
9. "Little maiden, pause and ponder" (Voices in the air)
10. Act 1 Finale

"Madam, do not think us rude in" (Press Students and Girls)
"There once was a man in a seaside town" (Proctor and Chorus)
"An officer I, strolling by" (Jack)
"When I was a little piccaninny" (Jane Annie and Chorus)
"Hail, Jane Annie, hail!" (Milly, Rose, Miss Sims, Caddie, Proctor, Sim, Greg and Chorus)

- Act 2
1. Introduction..."A page boy am I" (Caddie and Bab)
2. "To golf is staid for bashful maid" (Girls)
3. "A girl again I seem to be" (Miss Sims)
4. "Where the willows shade the river" (Press Students)
5. "When I was a" (Sim and Greg)
6. "We are conscious that we slightly condescend" (Jack and Soldiers)
7. "You and I, dear Jack, will show" (Jane Annie, Jack and Chorus)
8. Ballet
9. "Last night when we were forced to part" (Bab and Tom)
10. "I'm a man of erudition" (Proctor and Bab)
11. "You're now a sentimental maid" (Jane Annie, Miss Sims, Bab, Tom, Jack, Proctor and Chorus)
12. "The moral of this story is" (Milly, Miss Sims, Proctor and Chorus)

== See also ==
- Savoy Opera
