= Harry Greenbank =

English author and dramatist

Harry Greenbank (11 September 1865 – 26 February 1899) was an English writer and dramatist best known for contributing lyrics to the successful series of musicals produced at Daly's Theatre by George Edwardes in the 1890s.

== Life and career ==
Harry Greenbank was born Henry Hewetson Greenbank in London, England on 11 September 1865. He had an extraordinarily productive, but short, life.

Greenbank first placed one of his works, Captain Billy, at the Savoy Theatre, set to music by the company's musical director François Cellier. The piece was staged as a curtain-raiser to The Nautch Girl beginning in 1891. He continued to write such small-scale pieces over the following couple of years, both for the Savoy (Mr. Jericho in 1893 and Old Sarah in 1897) and for the Lyric Theatre, where Horace Sedger asked him to supply the English lyrics to F. C. Burnand's adaptation of the French operetta Le coeur et la main (Incognita).

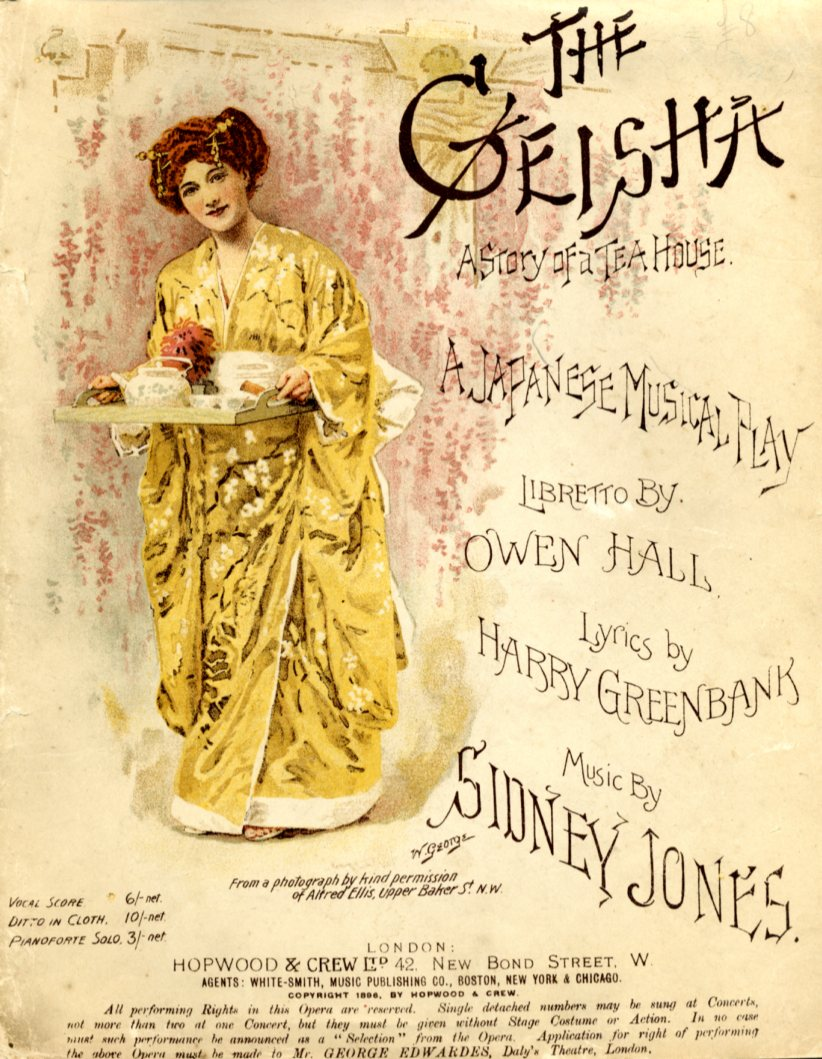
Cover of the Vocal Score

After that, George Edwardes put Greenbank together as lyricist with music director Sidney Jones and dramatist Owen Hall to create the hit musical comedy A Gaiety Girl in 1893. After the worldwide success of that piece, the three stayed together and subsequently formed the backbone of the team which produced the famous series of very successful series of Daly's Theatre musicals, including An Artist's Model (1895), The Geisha (1896), A Greek Slave (1898), and San Toy (1899).

At the same time, Greenbank also provided lyrics for two of the most successful of the lighter shows produced by Edwardes at the Gaiety Theatre The Circus Girl (1896) and A Runaway Girl (1898). He also ventured twice as librettist-lyricist, once with an original musical, Monte Carlo, and once with an adaptation of Lecocq's La Petite Mademoiselle as The Scarlet Feather. He also contributed additional lyrics for The Bric à Brac Will (1895) and, posthumously, a song for the London production of A Chinese Honeymoon (1901), "Roses Red and White".

Greenbank was often in ill health, and during the production of A Greek Slave, he moved with his wife and son to England's southern coast in an attempt to regain some strength. He died there while writing lyrics for San Toy, and the piece was completed by Adrian Ross, who, with Greenbank, was largely responsible for establishing the post of lyricist (as opposed to librettist, or co-writer) in the modern musical theatre.

He died in Boscombe, Bournemouth, Hampshire on 26 February 1899 at the age of 33.
