= Haddon Hall (opera) =

1893 comic opera by Arthur Sullivan

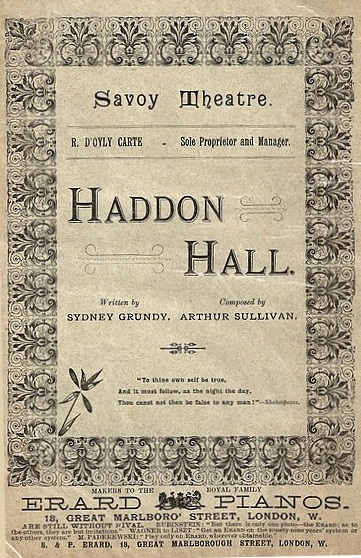
Programme for Haddon Hall, 1893

Haddon Hall is an English light opera with music by Arthur Sullivan and a libretto by Sydney Grundy. The opera, set at the eponymous hall, dramatises the legend of Dorothy Vernon's elopement with John Manners, resetting the tale in the 17th century.

It premiered at the Savoy Theatre on 24 September 1892 for a modestly successful run of 204 performances, closing on 15 April 1893. The piece was popular with amateur theatre groups, particularly in Britain, up to the 1920s, but has been produced only sporadically since then. The National Gilbert & Sullivan Opera Company presented the opera in August 2018 in Buxton and Harrogate, England.

== Background ==
When the Gilbert and Sullivan partnership disbanded after the 1889 production of The Gondoliers, the impresario Richard D'Oyly Carte tried to find a new collaborator with whom Sullivan could write comic operas for the Savoy Theatre. Grundy was familiar to Carte, having written The Vicar of Bray in 1882 with Carte's friend Edward Solomon, and also from his many English adaptations of French works. Although modestly successful, Haddon Hall was far less so than Sullivan's earlier Savoy Operas with W. S. Gilbert, and Sullivan did not write any further operas with Grundy.

Haddon Hall is a dramatisation of a 19th-century legend: Dorothy Vernon's elopement in 1563 with John Manners, son of Thomas Manners, 1st Earl of Rutland. For the opera, Grundy moved the story forward to about 1660, adding the conflict between the Royalists and the Roundheads as a backdrop to the plot.

John D'Auban rehearsing W. H. Denny for Haddon Hall

The 1892 opening night cast included such Savoy Theatre favourites as Courtice Pounds as John Manners, Charles Kenningham as Oswald, Rutland Barrington as Rupert Vernon, W. H. Denny as The McCrankie, and Rosina Brandram as Lady Vernon. Florence Easton originated the small role of Deborah and later played the role of Dorothy Vernon. John D'Auban choreographed the production.

Although the story has its comic episodes, the work's tone is considerably more serious than Savoy audiences were accustomed to. Most of the comedy is derived from satiric swipes at the hypocritical Puritans who arrive with Rupert Vernon. Among them is a comic Scotsman, "The McCrankie." The original review in The Times observed:

Whether from the impression that even thus the comic element needed strengthening, or from the very natural desire to provide a good part for Mr. Denny, the author has introduced, in the M'Crankie, a figure which, though wholly unnecessary to the development of the plot, and in his surprising mixture of Scottish characteristics scarcely credible in any period, will probably have as much to say to the success of the new piece as any of the characters. It is true that the absurdities of the part would be more acceptable in one of the frankly extravagant inventions of the older librettist than in a more professedly historical, and one which presents in all other respects, faithful pictures of the place and period chosen.

The piece followed Sullivan's only grand opera, Ivanhoe (1891). Haddon Hall was performed with some regularity by amateur operatic societies in Britain in the first three decades of the 20th century, but it has rarely been performed since then. Its last professional production for over a century was a British provincial tour by one of Carte's touring companies in 1899. The National Gilbert & Sullivan Opera Company presented the first professional staging in August 2018 in Buxton and Harrogate, England, in 2018 at the 25th International Gilbert and Sullivan Festival, starring Richard Suart and Donald Maxwell. A recording was made by The Prince Consort in 2000, and the first complete professional recording was released in 2020 by Dutton featuring the BBC Singers and BBC Concert Orchestra, conducted by John Andrews.

The whereabouts of the composer's autograph score were not publicly known until Terence Rees purchased it at auction in 1966.

== Historical context ==
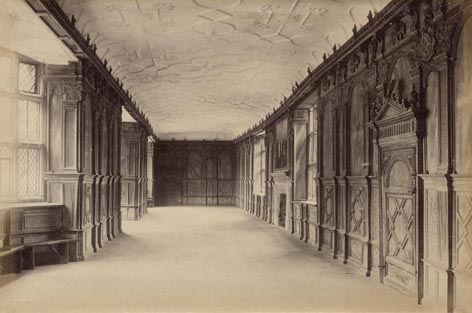
Haddon Hall's long gallery, c. 1890

Sir George Vernon was a prosperous and hospitable landowner in Derbyshire, and his family seat was at Haddon Hall. His second daughter, Dorothy (c. 1545 – 24 June 1584), fell in love with John Manners (c. 1534 – 4 June 1611), the second son of Thomas Manners, who had been created Earl of Rutland in 1525.

According to legend (none of the following can be verified), Sir George disapproved of the union, possibly because the Manners family were Protestants and the Vernons were Catholics, or possibly because the second son of an earl had uncertain financial prospects. Sir George forbade John Manners from courting the famously beautiful and amiable Dorothy and forbade his daughter from seeing Manners. Torn by her love for her father and her love for John Manners, Dorothy fled Haddon Hall in 1563 to elope with Manners. Shielded by the crowd during a ball given by Sir George, Dorothy slipped away and fled through the gardens, down stone steps and over a footbridge where Manners was waiting for her, and they rode away to be married. If indeed this happened, the couple soon reconciled with Sir George, as they inherited the estate on his death two years later. Haddon Hall remains in the Manners family.

In the libretto Grundy wrote, "The clock of Time has been put forward a century, and other liberties have been taken with history." The actual Sir George Vernon had two daughters, Margaret and Dorothy. In the opera, the Vernons also had an older son, who died in naval service, leaving Dorothy as his sole heir. The potential husband her father prefers, their cousin Rupert Vernon, is Grundy's invention. Some of the key changes to the opera's plot bear striking similarities to another comic opera, The Warlock, libretto by Alfred Smythe, music by Edgar E. Little, produced in February 1892 in Dublin, Ireland.

== Roles and original cast ==
Courtice Pounds (John Manners) and Lucille Hill (Dorothy Vernon), 1892

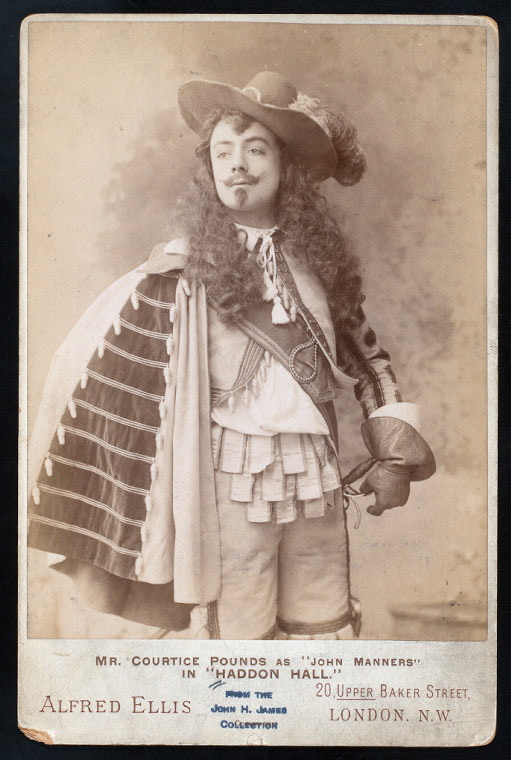
Pounds as John Manners

John Manners (tenor) – Courtice Pounds
Sir George Vernon (baritone) – Richard Green
Oswald (tenor) – Charles Kenningham

)
) Royalists
)

Rupert Vernon (baritone) – Rutland Barrington

Roundhead

The McCrankie (bass-baritone) – W. H. Denny
Sing-Song Simeon (bass) – Rudolph Lewis
Kill-Joy Candleman (non-singing) – W. H. Leon
Nicodemus Knock-Knee (bass) – Arthur W. Fowles
Barnabas Bellows-to-Mend (bass) – George de Pledge

)
)
) Puritans
)
)

Major Domo (baritone) – H. Gordon
Dorothy Vernon (soprano) – Lucille Hill
Lady Vernon (contralto) – Rosina Brandram
Dorcas (mezzo-soprano) – Dorothy Vane
Nance (mezzo-soprano) – Nita Cole
Gertrude (mezzo-soprano) – Claribel Hyde
Deborah (soprano) – Florence Easton

== Synopsis ==
It is 1660, just before the Restoration of the Monarchy. Sir George Vernon, a Royalist, is in a property dispute with his cousin, Rupert Vernon, a Roundhead (i.e., a supporter of Parliament). Sir George fears that this dispute will be resolved in favour of his cousin, who has strong ties to the current government, and that his family would lose Haddon Hall. To secure the estate's long-term future, Sir George has arranged a marriage between Rupert and his only surviving child, Dorothy Vernon. But Dorothy is in love with John Manners, the impoverished second son of the Earl of Rutland. Manners, who is also a Royalist, is of no use to Sir George, and he has forbidden their union.

Prologue

The opera begins with an offstage chorus in praise of the "stately homes of England."

=== Act I — "The Lovers" ===
Scene. — The Terrace.

It is Dorothy Vernon's wedding day. The Vernons' maid, Dorcas, sings an allegory about "a dainty dormouse" (Dorothy) and "a stupid old snail" (Rupert), making clear that her sympathies lie with Dorothy, who is in love with "a gallant young squirrel" (John Manners). Sir George, Lady Vernon, and Dorothy enter. Sir George urges Dorothy to cheer up, so that she will make a good impression on her cousin, Rupert. Dorothy reminds her father that she loves John Manners. Sir George replies that Manners would be a suitable husband only if he will swear an oath in support of parliament. Dorothy knows that Manners will never do this, and Sir George orders her to marry her cousin. Dorothy asks for her mother's support, but Lady Vernon cannot help her.

Drawing of scene from Finale, Act I

Oswald enters, disguised as a travelling seller of housewares. He is actually a soldier and John Manners's friend and servant, carrying a letter for Dorothy. He encounters Dorothy's handmaiden, Dorcas, and the two quickly become enamoured of one another. When Dorothy appears, Oswald gives her the letter, in which Manners proposes that they elope, and Dorothy must finally decide where her loyalties lie. When Manners arrives, Dorothy tells him that her father will not allow them to be married unless he forswears his support for the king. Manners reiterates that he will not compromise his principles, and Dorothy assures him that her love is stronger than ever.

Rupert Vernon arrives with his companions, a group of Puritans. He has joined them because their connections to the current government will help him claim the title to Haddon Hall. But he admits that he is otherwise unsympathetic to the Puritan ideals of celibacy and self-abnegation. Rupert introduces the Puritans to the Vernon household, who make it clear they are not welcome. Sir George offers his daughter's hand, but Lady Vernon and Dorothy once again urge him to relent. Dorothy says she must be true to her heart. A furious Sir George orders her to her chamber, and threatens to disown her. Rupert and the Puritans are shocked to learn that they have been refused.

=== Act II — "The Elopement" ===
The Flight of Dorothy Vernon, illustration by M. Browne and Herbert Railton, October 1, 1892.

Scene 1. — Dorothy Vernon's Door.

It is a stormy night. Rupert and the Puritans are camped outside the house, because their conscientious scruples will not allow them to join the party indoors. They are joined by The McCrankie, a particularly strict Puritan from the Isle of Rum, in Scotland, who sings a song accompanied on the bagpipes. However, he is not beyond the occasional snort from his whisky flask, and he offers the Puritans a "drappie."

After the rest of the Puritans leave, Rupert and The McCrankie sing a duet about how they would rule the world, "if we but had our way." Dorcas enters to meet Oswald, but they intercept her. As no one else is looking, Rupert and The McCrankie want to steal a kiss, but Dorcas rebuffs them.

Oswald arrives to tell Dorcas that the horses are saddled, and ready to go. She is fearful for Dorothy's safety, and Oswald promises that he will protect her. Manners enters, then Dorothy. She sings a farewell to her home, and they flee in a violent storm.

Scene 2. — The Long Gallery.

As the storm dies away, the scene changes to the Long Gallery. Sir George proposes a toast to "the grand old days of yore." Rupert and The McCrankie drag in Dorcas, with the news that Dorothy has eloped with Manners. The frantic Sir George orders horses and gathers up his men to chase after them, with Rupert and the Puritans following. Lady Vernon predicts that the chase will be unsuccessful.

=== Act III — "The Return" ===
Scene. — The Ante-Chamber.

The chorus have all become Puritans, under Rupert's tutelage. Rupert informs them that the lawsuit has been resolved in his favour, and he is now Lord of Haddon Hall. Although he has generously permitted Sir George and Lady Vernon to remain on the estate, they have no intention of staying. Lady Vernon likens the loss of their home to the death of a rose. Alone together, she begs and then receives her husband's forgiveness, admitting that it was she who urged her daughter to flee. They re-affirm their love.

Oswald enters, now in uniform, with the news that the Commonwealth has fallen and the monarchy has been restored. King Charles II has claimed Haddon Hall as crown property. Rupert is in disbelief, and refuses to yield. Meanwhile, the Puritans decide to go on strike, practising their self-effacing principles only eight hours a day. The chorus fling down their books and decide to dedicate their lives "to Cupid." Rupert seeks The McCrankie's counsel, only to find that his friend has replaced his kilt with breeches. McCrankie explains that, after several snorts from his flask, he has finally decided to abandon Puritanism.

A cannon sounds, and Manners enters with soldiers. He has a warrant from the king, reinstating Sir George as Lord of Haddon Hall. He introduces Dorothy as his wife. She explains that she had followed her heart's counsel, and her father forgives her.

== Musical numbers ==
Illustration from Haddon Hall in The Graphic

Nita Cole as Nance and W. H. Denny as The McCrankie

- Introduction... "Ye stately homes of England" (Offstage Chorus)

Act I — "The Lovers"

- 1."Today it is a festal time" (Chorus)
- 1a. "'Twas a dear little doormouse" (Dorcas and Chorus)
- 1b. "When the budding bloom of May" (Sir George, Lady Vernon, and Dorothy with Dorcas and Chorus)
- 2. "Nay, father dear" (Dorothy, Lady Vernon, and Sir George)
- 3. "Mother, dearest mother" (Dorothy and Lady Vernon)
- 4. "Ribbons to sell" (Oswald and Chorus)
- 5. "The sun's in the sky" (Dorcas and Oswald)
- 6. "My mistress comes" (Dorothy, Dorcas, and Oswald)
- 7. "Oh, tell me what is a maid to say" (Dorothy, Dorcas, and Oswald)
- 8."The earth is fair... Sweetly the morn doth break (Dorothy and Manners) (1892), replaced by 8a.
- 8 1/2. "Exit" (1892), replaced by 8a
- 8a. "Why weep and wait?... Red of the Rosebud" (Dorothy) (1893)
- 9. "Down with princes" (Chorus of Puritans)
- 9a. "Entrance of Rupert"
- 10. "I've heard it said" (Rupert)
- 11. "The bonny bridegroom cometh (Chorus with Rupert and Puritans)
- 11a. "When I was but a little lad" (Rupert with Chorus)
- 11b. "To thine own heart be true" (Dorothy with Company)

Act II — "The Elopement"

Scene 1

- 12. "Hoarsely the wind is howling" (Chorus of Puritans with Rupert)
- 13. "My name it is McCrankie" (McCrankie)
- 14. "There's no one by" (Rupert and McCrankie)
- 15. "Hoity-Toity, what's a kiss?" (Dorcas, Rupert, and McCrankie)
- 16. "The west wind howls" (Dorcas, Oswald, and Manners)
- 16a. "Oh, heart's desire" (Dorothy and Manners)
- 16b. "Storm"

Scene 2

- 16c. "In days of old" (Sir George and Company)

Act III — "The Return"

- 17. "Our heads we bow" (Puritans and Chorus)
- 18. "Queen of the Garden" (Lady Vernon and Chorus)
- 19. "Alone, alone! No friendly tone" (Lady Vernon and Sir George)
- 19a. "Bride of my youth" (Lady Vernon and Sir George)
- 20. "In frill and feather" (Dorcas, Rupert, and Chorus)
- 21. "Good General Monk" (Oswald, Rupert, and Puritans)
- 21a. "We have thought the matter out" (Dorcas, Rupert, Puritans, and Chorus)
- 22. "Hech mon! Hech mon!" (McCrankie and Chorus)
- 22a. "Scotch Dance"
- 23. Hark! The cannon! (Company)
