= The Vicar of Bray (opera) =

1882 comic opera by Edward Solomon

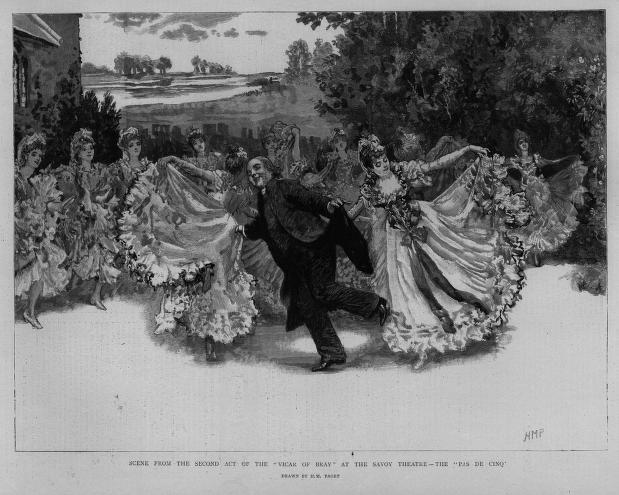
Scene from Act II: The "Pas de Cinq", 1892 at the Savoy Theatre

The Vicar of Bray is a comic opera by Edward Solomon with a libretto by Sydney Grundy which opened at the Globe Theatre, in London, on 22 July 1882, for a run of only 69 performances. The public was not amused at a clergyman's being made the subject of ridicule, and the opera was regarded by some as scandalous. An 1892 revival at the Savoy Theatre was more successful, lasting for 143 performances, after public perceptions had changed.

The opera is based on the character described in a satirical 18th-century English folk song "The Vicar of Bray", as well as on The History of Sandford and Merton, a series of 18th century moral tales. In the parlour song, the eponymous vicar was the clergyman of the parish of Bray-on-Thames, Berkshire. The most familiar version of the lyrics recounts his adaptability (some would say amorality) over half a century, from the reigns of Charles II to George I. Over this period he embraced whichever form of liturgy, Protestant or Catholic, that was favoured by the monarch of the day to retain his position as vicar of Bray. See the annotated lyrics to "The Vicar of Bray".

The earliest version of the song's lyrics may have been written by "an officer in Colonel Fuller's regiment," according to one source. The lyrics exist in various forms. However, the story of the vicar's cheerful reversals of principle remains the same in all circumstances. In the opera, the vicar switches between "High" and "Low" Church, that is, from ritualistic Anglo-Catholic ceremonies to austere evangelical forms of worship.

== Original production ==
The première was moderately well received by the press. Reynolds's Newspaper said, "The music is light and tuneful, the plot is clever, and the dialogue can boast to be of the Gilbertian order of writing." The influential theatrical newspaper The Era found the plot "singularly deficient" in interest, but praised "the smartness of the dialogue" and the "easy and fluent" music, though judging it as having "but little originality." The Manchester Guardian reported, "The entire work is a close imitation of Messrs. Gilbert and Sullivan's method. This is to be regretted, for the peculiar humour of The Sorcerer and Patience cannot be successfully copied." The cast, including W. J. Hill, Walter H. Fisher and W. S. Penley, received generally excellent notices. The work was produced in New York in October 1882, under Solomon's direction, but was a failure.

== 1892 Savoy Theatre revival ==
Rutland Barrington as the Vicar and Mary Duggan as Nelly Bly

When the Gilbert and Sullivan partnership disbanded after the production of The Gondoliers in 1889, impresario Richard D'Oyly Carte was forced to find new works to present at the Savoy Theatre. Solomon's The Nautch Girl was the first non-Gilbert and Sullivan "Savoy Opera" in 1891. Sullivan was writing a new opera for the Savoy that would become Haddon Hall, but this was delayed because of Sullivan's ill health. In the meantime, when The Nautch Girl closed after a modestly successful run, Carte revived The Vicar of Bray at the Savoy on 28 January 1892.

During the decade since the piece had been first presented, the public had come to accept clergymen as comic characters. As The Times wrote, "The run of [Grundy's] The Private Secretary changed the views even of the most serious playgoers, and it may be remarked in passing that the clerical functions of the Rev. Robert Spalding were judiciously kept altogether out of sight, as indeed they were in the case of [Dr. Daly in] The Sorcerer.... [The piece] was warmly received." The revival ran for a respectable 143 performances, with a cast that included Rutland Barrington, Courtice Pounds, W. H. Denny, and Rosina Brandram. The opera was then played by several D'Oyly Carte companies on provincial tours in 1893–96 and 1898–99. The title role was played by Henry Lytton in the 1893–96 tours, with Courtice Pounds repeating his role of the curate. Cox and Box was played as a curtain raiser.

== Synopsis ==
Act 1: Low Church. The Village Green.

The Rev. William Barlow, the Vicar of Bray, became Low Church to marry his rich wife who, now dead, has left him with a daughter, Dorothy. Dorothy is in love with her father's curate, Henry Sandford, a priggish, pompous and verbose young man. The Vicar prefers that his daughter marry Sandford's old schoolmate, Tommy Merton, son of a wealthy local landowner. To get Sandford out of the way, the Vicar, on the advice of his family solicitor, Mr. Bedford Rowe, turns High Church. Aghast, Sandford flees to become a missionary in the Cassowary Isles.

Act 2: High Church. The Vicarage Grounds.

Now that the Vicar and all his students have become High Church they are doomed to celibacy, and the chorus of lady Sunday School teachers is distraught at the loss of their matrimonial prospects. So, too, is Mrs. Merton, who has had her eye on the Vicar. Tommy Merton is prepared to marry Dorothy, but suddenly Sandford, who everyone supposed was devoured by cannibals, returns as an improved man – no longer pompous. Dorothy returns to her first love, but her father is adamant. The solicitor announces that the Vicar's High Church propensities have displeased his Bishop who has declared him defrocked, his living to be bestowed on Sandford. There is only one way out. The Vicar becomes Low Church again. He is now eligible to wed the wealthy Mrs. Merton, Sandford gets Dorothy, and Tommy goes off with the leading danseuse of the local theatre.

== Roles and historical casts ==
In the list below, the name of the original cast member is followed by the name of the 1892 counterpart.

- Reverend William Barlow, Vicar of Bray – W. J. Hill; Rutland Barrington
- Reverend Henry Sandford, his curate – Walter H. Fisher; Courtice Pounds
- Thomas Merton, Esq., of Bray Manor – H. Cooper Cliffe; Richard Green
- Mr. Bedford Rowe, a Confidential Family Solicitor – W. S. Penley; W. H. Denny
- Mr. John Dory – R. R. Mason; W. S. Laidlaw
- Dorothy, the Vicar's Daughter [called Winifred in the 1892 version] – Lizzie Beaumont; Leonore Snyder
- Mrs. Merton, widow of Thomas Merton, of Jamaica – Maria Davis; Rosina Brandram
- Nelly Bly, of the Theatre Royal, Bray – Emma D'Auban; Mary Duggan
- Students of Divinity, Ladies of the Ballet, Teachers, Huntsmen, Jockeys.

== Musical numbers ==
Act I

- Chorus of Children – Hooray, hooray!
- Chorus of Lady Teachers – To a slow and stately measure
- Song, Winifred – O, Why is my love?
- Chorus of Teachers – All the bold
- Chorus of Students; and Solo Sandford – On, Students, on!
- Song, Sandford – As good as he ought to be
- Ensemble and Entrance of Vicar – Hail to the Vicar
- Song, Vicar – The Rev. Mr. Barlow
- Chorus – Bow, Students, bow!
- Song, Mr. Bedford Rose – I'm as sharp as a ferret
- Exit – Good morning, dear Vicar
- Entrance of Mrs Merton – Has anyone seen the Pytchley Pack?
- Trio, Rowe, Vicar and Mrs Merton – Now if you'll excuse me
- Duet, Vicar and Mrs. Merton – The shy widow
- Duet, Sandford and Winifred – Tell me true, love
- Chorus of Huntsmen; and Solo, Tommy Martin – Jolly, jolly Huntsmen!
- Chorus, Corps de Ballet – Please to make way for us
- Dance, Nelly Bly
- Ensemble – O, shocking sight
- Finale – Back, Students, back!

Act II

- Chorus of Teachers – Listen to the merry bells
- Concerted number: Students, Teachers & Vicar – What is life?
- Song and Chorus, Vicar and Students – The Jackson case
- Duet, Vicar and Mrs Merton – The Wily Widower
- Solo, Mrs Merton – You ask me why
- Duet, Winifred and Sandford – Come back to me
- Duet, Winifred and Sandford – Propriety, prisms and prunes
- Trio, Sandford, Merton & Winifred – Just a word
- Entrance, Nellie Bly
- Entrance, Corps de Ballet
- Dance, Pas de Cinq
- Exit of Vicar & Corps de Ballet
- Concerted number: Tommy, Merton, Bedford, Rowe and Huntsmen – Confidential family solicitor
- Chorus, Corps de Ballet – We no longer gyrate
- Concerted piece – Se, see, we saw!
- Chorus of Children – Lucky little boys and girls
- Wedding chorus – Lady Fair
- Finale – O William, sweet William
