= Ruth Vincent =

English opera singer and actress (1873–1955)

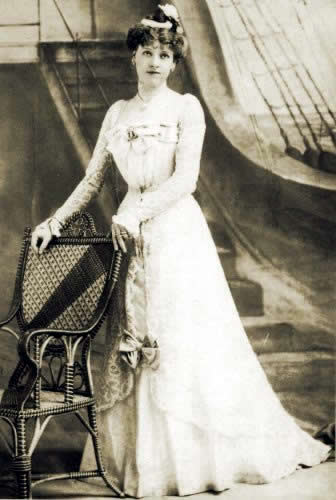
as Josephine in H.M.S. Pinafore, 1899

Ruth Vincent (born Amy Ruth Bunn, 3 December 1873 – 8 July 1955) was an English opera singer and actress, best remembered for her performances in soprano roles of the Savoy Operas with the D'Oyly Carte Opera Company in the 1890s and her roles in the West End during the first decade of the 20th century, particularly her role as Sophia in Tom Jones.

Vincent joined D'Oyly Carte in 1894 in the chorus at the age of 17. She began to play small roles in 1896, taking on larger roles in Gilbert and Sullivan revivals the following year and soon creating leading roles including Iza in The Grand Duchess of Gerolstein (1897–98), Laine in The Beauty Stone (1898) and Princess Laoula in The Lucky Star (1899). She also continued to sing leading roles in Gilbert and Sullivan revivals, including Casilda in The Gondoliers and Aline in The Sorcerer in 1898 and Josephine in H.M.S. Pinafore in 1899. Unhappy to be passed over for the leading soprano role in The Rose of Persia, Vincent left the company near the end of 1899.

After this, Vincent went on to a substantial career in Edwardian musical comedies, opera and concert singing. She created leading West End roles in Véronique (1904–05), Tom Jones (1907), The Belle of Brittany (1909) and several others, and she also performed on Broadway. From 1910, she began a grand opera career at Covent Garden and Drury Lane and then toured in oratorio and concerts and also in variety shows, performing until 1930.

== Biography ==
Vincent was born as Amy Ruth Bunn in Yarmouth, Norfolk, in 1873 to Emma (née Long and Henry Vincent Bunn, a butcher. She studied singing with a teacher in Norwich, then Herman Klein in London.

=== D'Oyly Carte years ===
Vincent in Yeomen, 1897

Vincent joined the D'Oyly Carte Opera Company in the chorus of The Chieftain at the Savoy Theatre in 1894 at the age of 17. In 1895, she toured the British provinces in the chorus. At the Savoy, she created the small part of Gretchen in The Grand Duke in 1896 and also occasionally played the larger role of Lisa. She sang in the chorus during the subsequent revival of The Mikado and then created the small role of Dorothea in His Majesty (by F. C. Burnand and Alexander MacKenzie) in 1897. She sang the role of Kate in the first revival of The Yeomen of the Guard beginning in 1897, filling in briefly in the leading role of Elsie in July of that year, then was given the part in August when Ilka Pálmay left the company.

For the next two years, Vincent was the company's principal soprano, playing the leading roles of Iza in The Grand Duchess of Gerolstein (1897–98) (Note: The production was variously billed as The Grand Duchess of Gerolstein or just The Grand Duchess.) and Casilda in The Gondoliers (1898), creating the role of Laine in The Beauty Stone (1898), singing Aline in The Sorcerer (1898), creating the part of Princess Laoula in The Lucky Star (early 1899), and playing Josephine in H.M.S. Pinafore (later in 1899). When she was passed over for the leading soprano part of Sultana Zubedyah in The Rose of Persia, Vincent rejected the part that she was offered ("Scent-of-Lilies") and left the D'Oyly Carte Opera Company in November 1899. As it turned out, Ellen Beach Yaw, the American soprano cast as the Sultana, was dismissed after only two weeks in the role, and the opportunity to replace her went to young Isabel Jay.

Vincent's younger sister, Madge Vincent, was a D'Oyly Carte chorister from 1898 to 1900 and also had a subsequent musical theatre career.

=== West End and grand opera career and later years ===
as Sophia in Tom Jones

Vincent did eventually get a chance to play the Sultana in The Rose of Persia in New York in the 1900 Charles Frohman production at Daly's Theatre (co-starring John Le Hay). She married Lieutenant Colonel John Fraser of the Royal Horse Guards and retired from the stage for a few years while continuing her vocal studies in Paris with Jacques Bouhy. She later studied in Berlin with Mme. Corelli. Vincent returned to the London stage in musical theatre roles, including as Merva Sunningdale in The Medal and the Maid in 1903 (and in New York in 1904). She played the title roles in the West End in Véronique in 1904–05 (and in New York 1905–06) and A Girl on the Stage in 1906. She was the Plaintiff in Trial by Jury in the Ellen Terry Jubilee celebration on 12 June 1906 and the title role of Princess Amasis in Amasis: An Egyptian Princess in 1906–07. The English Illustrated Magazine wrote that Vincent "has some charming songs, to which her full rich voice gives admirable effect." She next starred as Sophie in Tom Jones (1907) and in the title roles in The Belle of Brittany and A Persian Princess, both in 1909.

In 1910 Vincent made her debut in grand opera in Thomas Beecham's seasons at Covent Garden and Drury Lane, singing in Hansel and Gretel (as Hansel), Così fan Tutte (as Fiordiligi), The Tales of Hoffmann (as Antonia), Carmen (as Micaela) and Don Giovanni (as Zerlina). She sang the role of Vrenchen (the Juliet role) in the first British performance of Delius's opera, A Village Romeo and Juliet. The Manchester Guardian commented, "Miss Ruth Vincent acted with much sincerity and charm as Vrenchen, and sang admirably ... she has a voice of remarkable purity, capable of great expression."

Vincent performed a concert tour of the British provinces in 1911 and sang in her first oratorio, Messiah, in 1912 at the Albert Hall, and in Elijah at the Three Choirs Festivals at Hereford in 1912 and Gloucester in 1913. In her later years, she appeared in concert, in oratorio (including Hiawatha staged annually under conductor Malcolm Sargent and others at the Albert Hall), and in variety shows at the London Palladium, the Coliseum Theatre and in the provinces. Vincent retired in 1930. Her hobbies included riding horses and gardening.

Vincent died in London in 1955. Some of her personal possessions were sold at auction at Christies in London in January 2000.

== Recordings ==
Vincent made a number of recordings of songs for HMV and Columbia between 1904 and 1920 including "The Waltz Song" from Edward German's Tom Jones, and songs by Luigi Arditi, Haydn Wood, Percy Fletcher, and Frederic Hymen Cowen. Her voice can be heard on the CD The Art of the Savoyard (Pearl GEMM CD 9991).

== Sources ==
- Ayre, Leslie (1972). The Gilbert & Sullivan Companion. London: W.H. Allen & Co Ltd. ISBN 978-0-396-06634-7.
- Listing of a number of Vincent's West End roles
