= His Majesty (opera) =

Opera by Alexander Mackenzie, F. C. Burnand and R. C. Lehmann

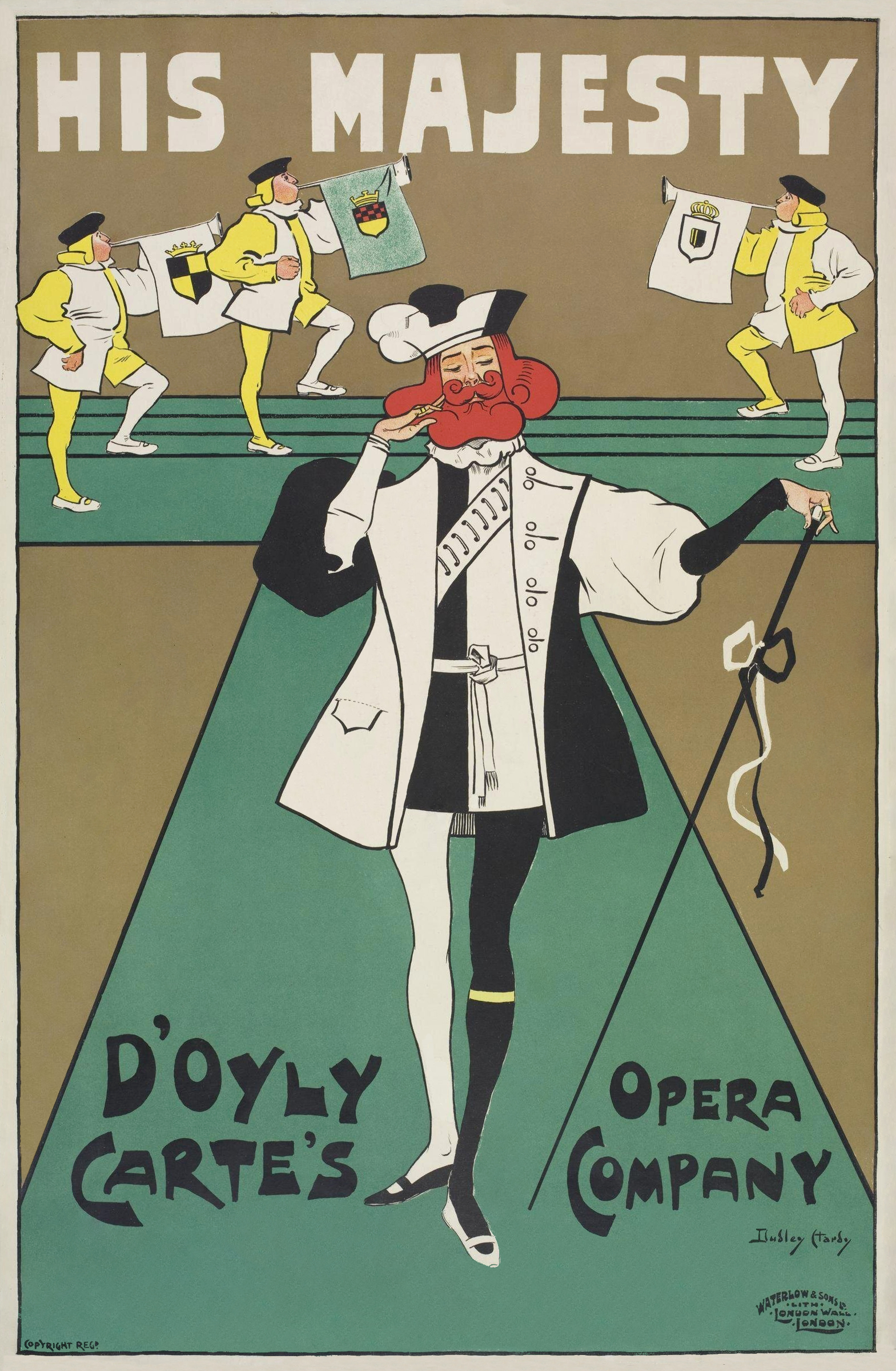
Advertising poster for 1897 production

His Majesty, or, The Court of Vingolia is an English comic opera in two acts with dialogue by F. C. Burnand, lyrics by R. C. Lehmann, additional lyrics by Adrian Ross and music by Alexander Mackenzie.

The work premiered at the Savoy Theatre in London on 20 February 1897, running for only 61 performances until 24 April 1897, despite a strong cast including George Grossmith, Ilka Pálmay, Scott Russell, Fred Billington, Florence Perry and Walter Passmore. The D'Oyly Carte Opera Company then toured the opera throughout 1897 alongside more familiar Gilbert and Sullivan works.

== Background ==
When the Gilbert and Sullivan partnership collapsed after the production of The Gondoliers in 1889, impresario Richard D'Oyly Carte struggled to find successful new works to present at the Savoy Theatre. He was able to bring Gilbert and Sullivan together briefly for two more operas, neither of which was a great success. In fact, after its disappointingly short run, their last piece, The Grand Duke (1896), was the only outright failure of a Gilbert and Sullivan opera. Arthur Sullivan had produced two operas for the Savoy in the early 1890s with librettists other than W. S. Gilbert, but neither had proved particularly successful, and pieces by other composers, for example Mirette, had fared worse.

== Synopsis ==
The late father of King Ferdinand intended that Ferdinand marry Lucilla Chloris, the daughter of the king of Osturia, and Chloris has arrived at the Court of Vingolia for the wedding with her ladies. Ferdinand and the Princess have never met and have never seen any portrait of one another.

However, Ferdinand has fallen in love with the peasant maid Felice, the adopted daughter of an old woodman, and has wooed her while disguised as a court artist. Meanwhile, Princess Chloris is in love with Prince Max of Baluria. Prince Max devises a plan which, if carried out, will allow the Princess to elope with him, while Felice takes her place.

Boodel, the King's former master of the revels, has been listening in on various conversations but only hears the end of each of them. He concludes that there is a plot afoot to assassinate Ferdinand. He becomes especially suspicious of a trunk carried by Felice. Preparations for war begin. But it turns out that Felice and her trunk bear a secret that changes everything: Proof that she is, in fact, Chloris's older sister, and thus the one meant to be engaged to Ferdinand all along.

=== Production ===
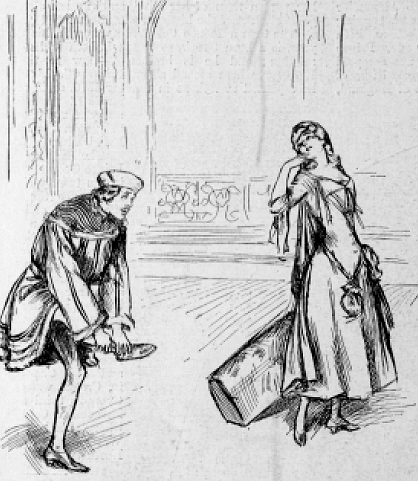
George Grossmith and Ilka Pálmay

Carte assembled a high-quality team for His Majesty, including the well-known dramatist and writer F. C. Burnand and the well-respected composer Alexander Mackenzie. Lyrics were supplied by Rudolph Lehmann, though his career gave no hint of a particular talent at writing verse.

The piece was expected to draw the public solely on the strength of the return of George Grossmith after an absence of almost a decade from the Savoy Theatre. Grossmith was well and fondly remembered for his creation there of the comedy roles in the famous series of Gilbert and Sullivan operas, and during his years away, he had become the most popular solo piano entertainer in the country. The Savoy audience was eager to see him perform together on stage with his successor in the Savoy opera roles, Walter Passmore. Rehearsals began in December 1896, an unusually long rehearsal period for the Savoy, but Mackenzie later recalled that even the company felt that the work was not wanted. London's leading stage director, Charles Harris, was engaged, but he died a few days before the opera premiered, leaving the Cartes to finish his work. Richard D'Oyly Carte took ill, leaving the final arrangements to his wife, Helen. The Savoy's usual choreographer, John D'Auban arranged the dances.

The opening night met with instantaneous signs of disapproval. Grossmith received an ovation at his first appearance, but his entrance number met with a cool response from the house. The Whitehall Review declared that the audience preferred Passmore, and "whenever he appeared on the scene, hearty applause greeted him." Though six encores were taken on the opening night, the piece seemed doomed to failure before its first public representation was complete. Only three principals came forward for their curtain call. Mackenzie was applauded warmly for his music, but when Burnand and Lehmann came forward, there was booing and hissing from all the private boxes and most of the pit.

=== Critical reaction and aftermath ===
Although this would be his only comic opera, The Times called Mackenzie's score "appropriate throughout, musicianly, and very often marked by distinction as well as humour," though it called the book dull and "confused". Other newspapers called Mackenzie's score "a comic oratorio", "devoid of memorable tunes" or "peculiarly unattractive, almost entirely devoid of humour, strangely wanting in charm, brightness, fizz and spontaneity" and opined that "some of the best lines were appropriated to the most severe music". The press uniformly found fault with the verbose libretto and felt that the music and book were not well suited to each other. They praised Passmore's comic acting but were disappointed by the nervous Grossmith, commenting that he was unsuited to the role of King Ferdinand.

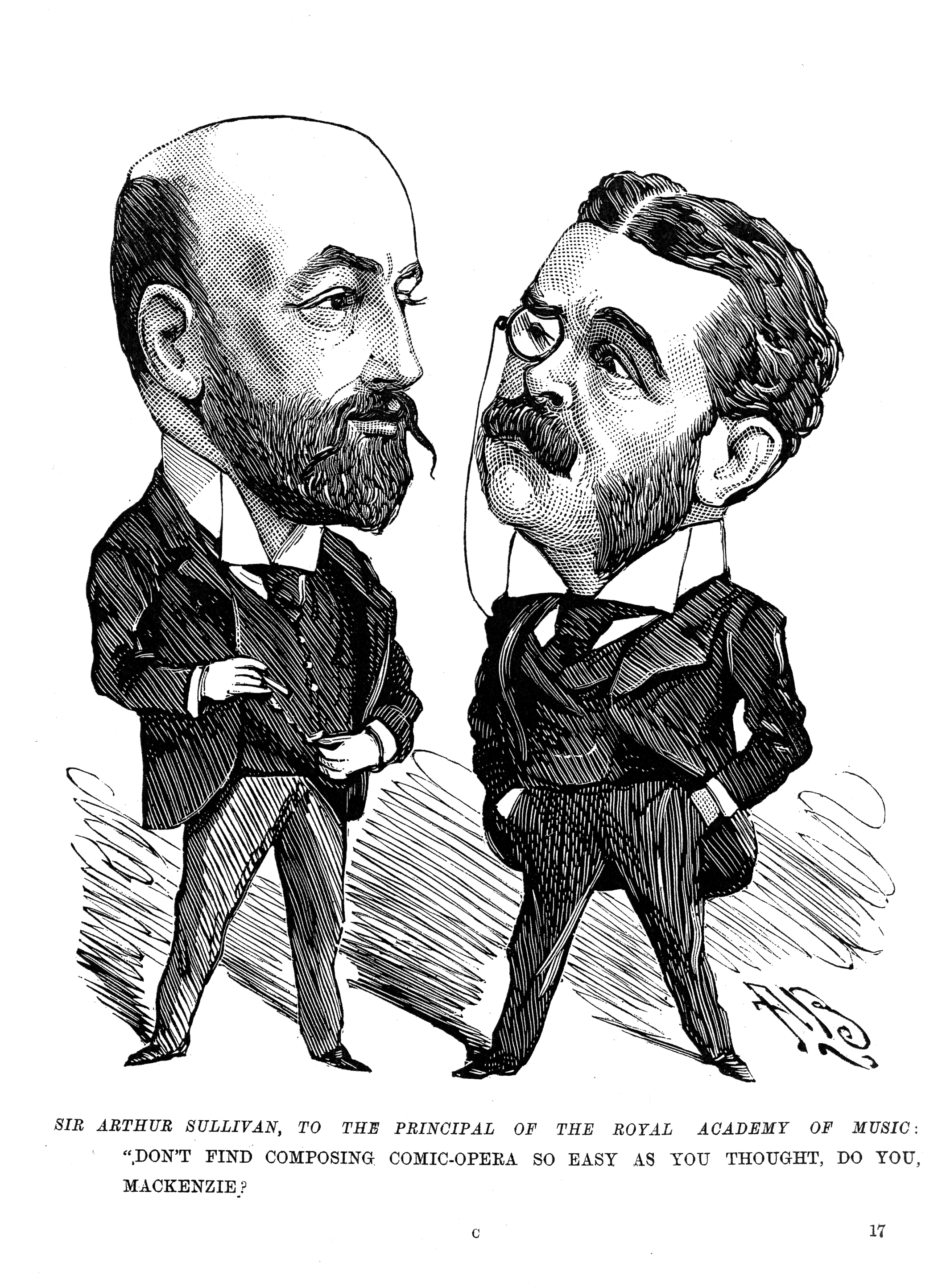
Mackenzie with Arthur Sullivan: 1897 cartoon alluding to the irony of the failure of His Majesty after Mackenzie's criticism of Sullivan for "wasting his talents" on comic opera.

Grossmith lasted only four performances before pleading ill-health and returning to retirement. Charles H. Workman, playing Adam, filled in as Ferdinand until Henry Lytton arrived and was ready to play the King. The histrionic Hungarian actress, Ilka Pálmay, who had been engaged for The Grand Duke and was still under contract to Carte, played Felice, a role that gave her many opportunities to display her talents as ballad singer, opera soprano and comedian. Florence Perry, who had been playing smaller roles up to that point, was cast as Chloris.

Alterations were made to the opera during Workman's tenure in the title role. Three songs were deleted, and the Act I Finale was shortened. Fred Billington became ill, and his part was taken by Jones Hewson for the remainder of the run. The opera closed on 24 April 1897 and was sent on tour with two D'Oyly Carte companies until September 1897, during which Mackenzie's autograph score was stolen.

== Musical numbers ==
- Overture

Act I - Interior of the Palace of Vingolia. View of the Royal Art Galleries.

- No. 1 - Introduction, trio and chorus - "When Ferdinand came to Vingolia throne"
- No. 2 - Chorus - "Hail our King in regal splendour"
- No. 3 - Song with chorus - King - "I was born upon a Sunday"
- No. 4 - Felice - "In the forest, in the forest, ah! how joyful are the days"
- No. 5 - Felice and Boodel - "Cross-examination"
- No. 6 - Gertrude, Adam, Boodel and Felice - "Who goes home?"
- No. 7 - Felice and King - "Why, oh why this cruel mockery?"
- No. 8 - Cosmo, Vincentius, Michael, Duchess, Schnippentrimmer, Clarkstein and King - "He doesn't explain"
- No. 9 - Female chorus - "The mistress we adore is"
- No. 9a - Chloris and chorus - "Delightful, oh delightful, I feel inclined to shout"

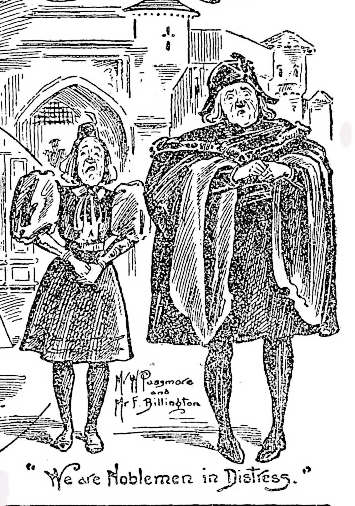
Walter Passmore and Fred Billington in Act II

- No. 10 - Serenade - Max - "Fair Chloris, let me be thy slave"
- No. 11 - Felice, Chloris, Max and Boodel - "I shall wear velvet and satin that speckless is"
- No. 12 - Coon song - "In de music-hally pieces when de rumpty tumpty ceases"
- No. 13 - Beard chorus - "By the King's decree, all of us are hirsute"
- No. 14 - Finale Act I - "War, the very word inspires us"

Act II - On the Vingolia Ramparts. Preparations for War.

- No. 1 - Introduction and chorus - "Behold us, a mobilised nation; the banners are flaunting on high"
- No. 2 - Felice - "When a gallant soldier loves from his lady love must go"
- No. 3 - Nautical song and hornpipe - Boodel and Sailors - "Who would not be a sailor"
- No. 4 - Felice and King Ferdinand - "What is this mysterious feeling?"
- No. 5 - Felice, Chloris and King Ferdinand - "Das kleine Fraulein"
- No. 6 - Mopolio - "I am a King who must not smile, a fact profoundly vexing" (this song was replaced in the original run with "I'm a model of a melancholy king")
- No. 7 - Boodel and Mopolio - "Noblemen in distress"
- No. 8 - Felice, Chloris, Max and Ferdinand "Although we are at war" (this song was added during the original run)
- No. 9 - Finale Act II - "Ev'ry thought of trouble over, I propose to live in clover"

== Roles and opening cast ==
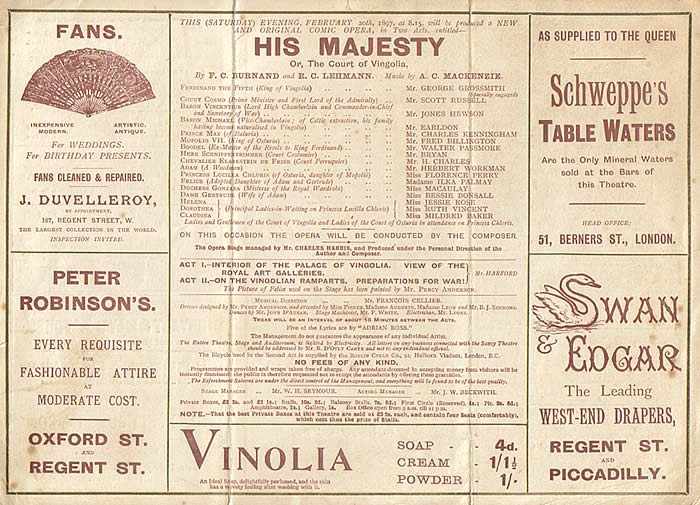
Cast list from opening night programme at the Savoy Theatre

- Ferdinand the Fifth (King of Vingolia) (baritone) – George Grossmith (later Henry Lytton)
- Count Cosmo (Prime Minister and First Lord of the Admiralty) (tenor) – Scott Russell
- Baron Vincentius (Lord High Chamberlain and Commander-in-Chief and Secretary of War) (baritone) – Jones Hewson
- Baron Michael (Vice-Chamberlain; of Celtic extraction) (baritone) – Mr. Earldon
- Prince Max (of Baluria) (tenor) – Charles Kenningham
- Mopolio VII (King of Osturia) (bass) – Fred Billington
- Boodel (Ex-Master of the Revels to King Ferdinand) (baritone) – Walter Passmore
- Herr Schippentrimmer (Court Costumier) (baritone) – Mr. Bryan
- Chevalier Klarkstein de Frise (Court Perruquier) (tenor) – H. Charles
- Adam (a Woodman) (baritone) – C. Herbert Workman (who also briefly played Ferdinand between Grossmith's departure and Lytton's arrival)
- Princess Lucilla Chloris (of Osturia, daughter of Mopolio) (soprano) – Florence Perry
- Felice (adopted daughter of Adam and Gertrude) (soprano) – Ilka Pálmay
- Duchess Gonzara (Mistress of the Royal Wardrobe) (mezzo-soprano) – Miss Macaulay
- Dame Gertrude (Wife of Adam) (contralto) – Bessie Bonsall
- Principal Ladies-in-Waiting on Princess Lucilla Chloris:
  - Helena (mezzo-soprano) – Jessie Rose
  - Dorothea (soprano) – Ruth Vincent
  - Claudina (soprano) – Mildred Baker
- Ladies and Gentlemen of the Court of Vingolia and Ladies of the Court of Osturia in attendance on Princess Chloris.
