= The Beauty Stone =

1898 English opera composed by Arthur Sullivan

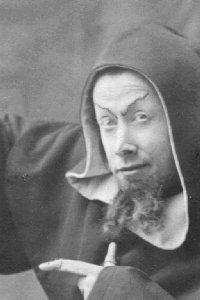
Passmore as The Devil

The Beauty Stone is an opera, billed as a "romantic musical drama" in three acts, composed by Arthur Sullivan to a libretto by Arthur Wing Pinero and J. Comyns Carr. The medieval Faustian story concerns an ugly, crippled girl, who dreams of being beautiful and meeting a handsome prince. The Devil offers her a magical stone that confers perfect beauty to anyone who wears it. The stone is passed from one character to another, but eventually the prince recognizes the girl's beautiful soul, the stone is discarded, and the disappointed Devil leaves the town.

It premiered at the Savoy Theatre on 28 May 1898, closing on 16 July 1898 after a run of just 50 performances, making it the least successful of Sullivan's operas. Reviewers criticised the lyrics and lengthy dialogue scenes and the lack of humour in the story. Savoy audiences, accustomed to more comic and satiric pieces, did not find the opera attractive. The cast of The Beauty Stone included Savoy regulars Walter Passmore, Rosina Brandram, Ruth Vincent, Emmie Owen and Henry Lytton, as well as opera singer Pauline Joran.

The opera was revived by the Carl Rosa Opera Company in 1901–02 on tour in a cut version.

== Background ==
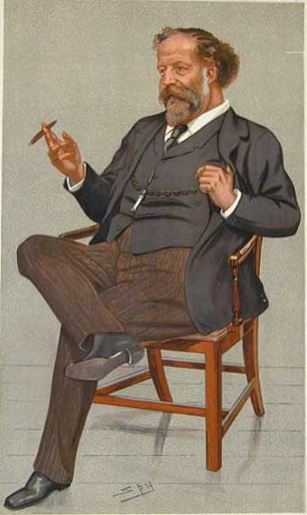
Carr in an 1893 caricature by Spy in Vanity Fair: "An Art Critic"

When the Gilbert and Sullivan partnership collapsed after the production of The Gondoliers in 1889, their producer Richard D'Oyly Carte struggled to find successful new works to show at the Savoy Theatre. Carte produced Sullivan's grand opera, Ivanhoe at another theatre, and afterwards, he turned to Sullivan to create more comic operas for the Savoy. With Sydney Grundy, Sullivan wrote the nostalgic and sentimental Haddon Hall (1892) then, reunited with W. S. Gilbert, he produced Utopia, Limited (1893). He next returned, with his earlier collaborator F. C. Burnand, with The Chieftain (1894) and collaborated for the last time with Gilbert on The Grand Duke (1896). None of these had proved to be more than modestly successful, and Carte's other new pieces for the Savoy in the 1890s had done no better. Following the success of Sullivan's ballet Victoria and Merrie England in 1897, Carte asked Sullivan to work on another new opera for the Savoy.

Carte assembled a high quality team for The Beauty Stone, hoping for a hit. J. Comyns Carr had earlier written the text for Henry Irving's grand production of the King Arthur legend, for which Sullivan had provided the incidental music score in 1895. Sullivan had in the past considered the idea of an opera on the same subject and was pleased when Carr offered him a similarly romantic work with a medieval setting. The eponymous beauty stone was a magical item that would transform its holder's appearance but would have unanticipated consequences. Sullivan seemed not to notice that this major element of the plot was simply a variant of the "magic lozenge" plot that Gilbert had so often proposed to the composer, and that he had repeatedly rejected. A. W. Pinero was at the height of his career in 1898, having produced several enduring successes in the 1890s, including The Second Mrs. Tanqueray (1893) and The Notorious Mrs. Ebbsmith (1895), and the same year as The Beauty Stone he would produce Trelawny of the 'Wells' (1898). One of the most important, prolific and popular British playwrights, Pinero was later knighted for his services to dramatic authorship. Carr conceived of the basic idea of the libretto, that true beauty is an inner quality. Carr confined himself to writing the lyrics, however, and Pinero was brought in to work out the plot and write the dialogue. Having brought together three such eminent talents, Carte had high expectations, and there was much anticipation in the press.

Pinero and Comyns Carr

The Beauty Stone was conceived as a musical drama different in style from the productions that had preceded it at the Savoy Theatre. Sullivan's intention was to create a work halfway between the romantic flights of his grand opera Ivanhoe and the familiar humour of the earlier Savoy operas. The composer, however, soon found that Carr's lyrics were unwieldy and difficult to set to music. In mid-December 1897, he wrote in his diary that his collaborators were difficult; when he asked for changes in the construction of the piece, they refused to make the alterations. He was forced to involve Helen Carte to mediate the disagreements with his collaborators. Even so, Sullivan continued to be disappointed in what he had to work with. In February 1898, he wrote in his diary: "[H]eartbreaking to have to try to make a musical piece out of such badly constructed (for music) mess of involved sentences." Nevertheless, after working further with Carr in March, he was able to work out the key difficulties, and his struggles with the complexity of the lyrics seems to have inspired some of Sullivan's longest melodic lines and interesting musical settings. Rehearsals began early in April 1898.

Moreover, the Savoy was not the right place to produce such a drama, because its audience was used to seeing comic operas focused on wit, humour and Gilbertian satire. To provide them with a mostly dark-toned romantic piece consisting of pseudo-medieval dialogue (and too much of it), lengthy grand-operatic musical numbers and a serious exploration of complex characters turned out to be a grave mistake. In addition, The Beauty Stone is a very long piece – it played for nearly four hours on opening night; several items were cut soon after opening night, but the cuts did not improve matters. At the same time, competition from the new theatrical art form of George Edwardes-style musical comedy produced at other London theatres offered lighthearted entertainment choices to the Savoy audience, with catchy tunes, dancing and witty banter. For a modern audience, however, there is much to admire about The Beauty Stone. Pinero's book, though overly long, contains vivid characters with psychological depth that Sullivan was able to develop more fully than in his shorter comic operas. The complex way in which these characters react to the beauty stone makes this plot device different from the way Gilbert treated his magic lozenges and gave Sullivan a chance to employ rich musical portraits of yearning, despair, love and beauty.

== Production, reception and aftermath ==
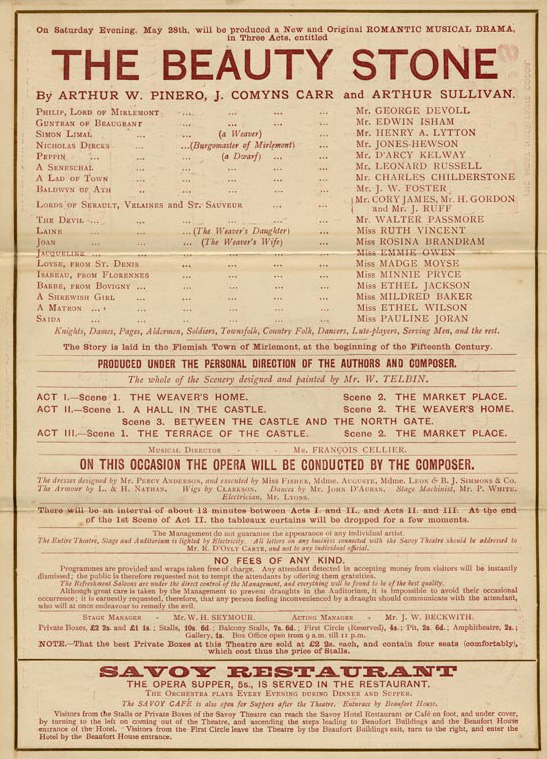
Savoy Theatre programme

The Beauty Stone premiered at the Savoy Theatre on 28 May 1898. Sullivan conducted the premiere, as he always did with his operas. It closed on 16 July 1898 after a run of just 50 performances, making it the least successful of Sullivan's operas. In contrast, the most successful shows that opened in London in 1898 had far longer runs: The Belle of New York (697 performances); A Greek Slave (349 performances); and A Runaway Girl (593 performances). The cast of The Beauty Stone included Savoy regulars Walter Passmore, Rosina Brandram, Ruth Vincent, Emmie Owen and Henry Lytton. Some of the music is more challenging than the typical Savoy Opera, and so Sullivan insisted on casting several opera singers, including Covent Garden opera soprano Pauline Joran as Saida (at an increased salary), and the size of the chorus was increased. Choreography was by John D'Auban. Costumes by Percy Anderson and sets by William Telbin, Jr. (d. 1931) were universally praised by the critics.

Savoy Theatre audiences were not enthusiastic about the piece. "The Savoy is in the minds of the public so essentially identified with a light after-dinner entertainment that romantic opera is not to the taste of its patrons". Reviewers noted that the opera was "mounted with the artistic finish, completeness, and liberality customary at this popular theatre. Sir Arthur has had to deal with a subject differing widely from those which, at the Savoy, his dainty and humorous muse is so thoroughly identified. This, and the inferiority of the lyrics … must be taken into account. … Speaking for ourselves, we confess freely to disappointment." They found it too long, disjointed and dull, disliked the pseudo-archaic dialogue and nearly all condemned the lyrics. They noted its lack of humour and the satire for which Savoy pieces had been famous. A few critics found much to like in the story, and many praised most of the cast (except for Philip and Guntran) and Sullivan's music, or at least some of it.

In The Saturday Review, Max Beerbohm wrote, "Lyrics written by gentlemen who have had no experience in the difficult art of writing words for music, and sung in a theatre which one associates with Mr. W. S. Gilbert, are not likely to charm the most amenable audience." He said of Carr and Pinero, "I am sure that the indisputable dulness of their Beauty Stone comes, mainly, from their pseudo-archaic manner." Pinero commented, many years later: "I doubt whether any of us had much faith in The Beauty Stone, as likely to attract the Savoy public in large numbers, but we – Sullivan, Carr and I – did what we wanted to do; and, though it doesn't pay the butcher's bill, there lies the artist's reward." Sullivan disagreed, hoping "that one day The Beauty Stone may be revived, with about half the libretto ruthlessly cut away".

The opera was revived on tour by the Carl Rosa Opera Company in 1901–02, which drastically cut the dialogue, reducing the running time of the piece to about 2½ hours. When Sullivan died, his autograph scores passed to his nephew, Herbert Sullivan, and then to Herbert's widow. After her death, the collection was broken up and sold by auction at Sotheby's in London on 13 June 1966. Some items were sold for considerable sums (the score of Trial by Jury sold for £9,000), but the manuscript of The Beauty Stone sold for a mere £110 to a dealer and eventually was acquired by the collector Colin Prestige. Upon his death, almost forty years later, the manuscript was bequeathed to Oriel College, Oxford, and in December 2005 scholars from the Sir Arthur Sullivan Society were able to examine the manuscript, along with other Sullivan autograph manuscripts. They discovered, at the back of The Beauty Stone, the items that had been cut after opening night, which were completely unknown to that time. Since then, these items have been performed in concert and included on the 2013 Chandos recording, although no full professional productions of the opera have been given since Carl Rosa's over a century ago.

== Roles and original cast ==
Illustration of Passmore as The Devil

- Philip, Lord of Mirlemont (tenor) – George Devoll
- Guntran of Beaugrant (baritone or bass-baritone) – Edwin Isham
- Simon Limal (a Weaver) (baritone) – Henry Lytton
- Nicholas Dircks (Burgomaster of Mirlemont) (bass-baritone) – Jones Hewson
- Peppin (a dwarf) (non-singing) – D'Arcy Kelway
- A Seneschal (non-singing) – Leonard Russell
- A Lad of the Town (non-singing) – Charles Childerstone
- Baldwyn of Ath (non-singing) – J. W. Foster
- The Lords of Serault (tenor), Velaines (baritone) and St. Sauveur (bass) – Cory James, N. Gordon and J. Ruff
- The Devil (baritone) – Walter Passmore
- Laine (the Weaver's daughter) (soprano) – Ruth Vincent
- Joan (the Weaver's wife) (contralto) – Rosina Brandram
- Jacqueline (mezzo-soprano) – Emmie Owen
- Loyse, from St. Denis (soprano) – Madge Moyse
- Isabeau, from Florennes (mezzo-soprano) – Minnie Pryce
- Blanche, from Bovigny (mezzo-soprano) – Ethel Jackson
- A Shrewish Girl (non-singing) – Mildred Baker
- A Matron (non-singing) – Ethel Wilson
- Saida (soprano) – Pauline Joran

== Synopsis ==
The story is laid in the Flemish town of Mirlemont in the beginning of the 15th century.

=== Act I ===
Scene 1

Ruth Vincent as Laine

The scene takes place at the home of Simon Limal, a weaver. It is a sombre, wretched-looking dwelling. Simon and his wife, Joan, sing a duet about their dreary lives. Joan has sent their daughter, Laine, into the town to buy bread and draw water. Simon fears that Laine, who is ugly and crippled, will be mocked by the town folk. On her way home, Laine is accosted by townsfolk, who try to force her to kiss a dwarf. They all burst into Simon's home. Laine's water pitcher is broken, but Jacqueline rescues her from further harm.

Philip, Lord of Mirlemont, has announced a beauty contest, which is to be held in the market-place later that day, and has drawn beautiful girls from many adjoining towns. Laine dreams of getting a close look at the gallant Philip and his companion, Saida, but her mother discourages her. When her parents leave, Laine sings a prayer to the Virgin Mary: she wishes for beauty, so that she can experience love; otherwise, she wishes to die.

The Devil arrives, although she mistakes him for a holy friar. He offers his sympathy, and says that he has an answer to her prayers in the form of a magical stone that confers perfect beauty to anyone who wears it. Laine's parents return. Though initially surprised to find a stranger in their midst, they too believe that the Devil is a holy man. The Devil further explains the stone's magical powers. Simon eagerly accepts the stone and gives it to Laine, who goes to her chamber to put it on. Joan fears that the stone may bring bad luck with it. The Devil explains that he has often given the stone away, but it always comes back. However, all of their doubts are overlooked when Laine re-enters, wondrously beautiful.

Scene 2

In the market-place of Mirlemont, the people of the town gather for the beauty contest. A competitor crowned with lilies enters with her supporters, but most of the townspeople doubt that she will win.

Illustration of Owen as Jacqueline

The Devil, now posing as a nobleman, has a letter of introduction to Lord Philip, which he presents to Guntran, Philip's loyal friend. Guntran complains that Philip is distracted by the pursuit of beauty, and is not sufficiently attentive to warfare. The Devil comments that Mirlemont is a more "vastly interesting" place than he had expected. He recruits Jacqueline, disguising her as a boy, Jacques, to serve as his page.

Philip and his entourage enter for the beauty contest. Several maidens vie for his attention, but he is not impressed with any of them. The Devil suggests that, as there is "so little beauty" in Mirlemont, the Prince should instead order the ugliest man, the dwarf Peppin, to marry the ugliest woman. The Burgomaster suggests the weaver's daughter, Laine. The chorus call for Laine, but when she enters, she is now transcendently beautiful. Philip is entranced, but the rest of the townsfolk suspect she is a witch. Philip is convinced that anyone so beautiful must be innocent, and he anoints her as fairest of the fair.

=== Act II ===
Scene 1

In a hall in Castle Mirlemont, Philip plays cards with a party of knights and ladies. A messenger from the Duke of Burgundy arrives, requesting Philip's presence in battle, but Philip refuses, saying that he is no longer a man of war. Saida, Philip's former favourite, tells the Devil that Laine must be burned at the stake for witchcraft. The Devil advises her that she should instead try to learn for herself the mysterious secret behind Laine's sudden transformation. Saida dances for Philip. She briefly recaptures his attention, but he transfers it immediately to Laine when she enters, now richly dressed in fine robes.

Philip is enchanted by Laine's beauty. She explains that a holy man is responsible for the miracle, but her parents have forbidden her from saying any more. Philip insists that he loves her. She suspects that his attentions are fleeting, but says that she loves him in return. Laine's elderly parents, Simon and Joan, arrive at the castle, seeking to join their daughter. The Devil tells Philip that he will get rid of them, and he leads them away. He has guards beat them and drive them from the castle. Doubting Philip's honour, Laine asks to leave, but Philip locks the doors. Laine begs to be released, saying that she no longer wishes to be beautiful. Philip relents, and she rushes out. Encouraged by the Devil, Saida follows her, hoping to acquire Laine's magical beauty.

Knights en route to battle arrive at Philip's castle for a brief rest, but Philip refuses to greet them. Guntran is disgusted at Philip's lack of interest, recalling heroic deeds of Philip's youth. The knights urge Philip to join the battle, and when he refuses, Guntran names Philip as a coward. Stirred by this, Philip changes his mind and says that he will join the battle after all.

Scene 2

Back in the weaver's home, Joan and Simon have escaped the ruffians that chased them from Philip's castle. Laine returns. She is still in her rich clothes, but she has decided to relinquish the stone that has made her beautiful. She removes it from her neck, throws it on the ground, and hurries into her bed-chamber.

Saida (Pauline Joran) seduces Simon (Henry Lytton, now transformed into a youth)

Joan and Simon debate what to do with the stone. Joan fears that it brings evil to those to wear it, but she puts the stone around Simon's neck. He is transformed into a handsome, younger man. Saida and the Devil arrive, looking for the stone. When they see Simon, the Devil realizes what has happened. He encourages Saida to seduce him, so that she may gain the stone for herself.

Scene 3

In an open field near the Gate of Mirlemont, the Devil interrogates Jacqueline, whom he has directed to spy on Simon and Saida. She says that she observed the two of them walking arm in arm in a meadow, with Saida trying desperately, but unsuccessfully, to coax the secret from him. When Saida arrives, the Devil encourages her to take Simon to the castle and continue her seduction. While Simon and Saida are together, they encounter Joan and Laine, but he will have nothing to do with them.

To the sound of trumpets, Philip enters, dressed for battle. He announces that he has wearied of beauty, and is going to war. Joan and Laine beg Philip to intercede with Saida, whom they believe has abducted Simon. Philip dismisses their tale as gossip, and does not recognize Laine, who is once again ugly and crippled. The townsfolk raise Philip on their shoulders, and they go off to battle, leaving Laine trampled and senseless.

=== Act III ===
Scene 1

On a terrace in the castle, with the voice of Laine heard singing dolefully in the distance, Saida enters with Simon. He is enchanted with her, but he is still unwilling to confess the secret. When he hears Laine singing again, he is overcome with guilt. A servant announces that Philip has been victorious in battle. Simon presumes that he will be expelled from the castle, but Saida promises to keep him there. At last, Simon tells her the secret of the stone.

The Devil enters with Jacqueline. He frets that Saida needs to extract the stone from Simon before Lord Philip returns. In the meantime, he orders Jacqueline to sing a song. When she admits that she is in love with him, he dismisses her from service, saying that she is no longer of any use. Saida comes in and stands boldly facing the Devil; having taken the stone from Simon, she is now restored to youthful beauty. After she sings a triumphant aria, Simon follows, once again a bent old man. She crassly orders him to leave, and the Devil threatens him with a charge of witchcraft should he complain.

Philip and Guntran return from the war. Philip has fought heroically, but has lost his eyesight, and is now blind. Although Saida is now the most beautiful maid in Mirlemont, he is unable to see her. Laine's voice is heard once again outside, and Philip asks to speak with her. Saida warns that she is a cripple once again, but Philip replies that her soul is beautiful. The defeated Saida throws the stone away, and the Devil picks it up, noting ruefully that the stone always comes back.

Scene 2

At the market-place, the townsfolk assemble once again to greet the victorious Philip. Simon, who is once again dressed in rags, is reunited with Joan. Jacqueline enters in a daze and runs into the Devil, who is once again dressed as a holy friar. She has no memory of her week of service to the Devil, and she asks for the friar's blessing.

Philip enters and announces that he has chosen Laine, "the humblest among you," as his betrothed. "Though heaven hath set a veil upon these eyes," he says, "love's one star ... Shows clear the way that leads me to thy heart." The Devil quits the town, disappointed that his joke did not turn out as he had intended.

== Musical numbers ==
=== Act I ===
- Introduction (instrumental)

==== Scene 1 ====
- No 1. "Click, clack" – Duet (Simon and Joan)
- No 2. "Hobble, hobble, now we've caught her" (Simon, Joan, Chorus)
- No 2a. "Maidens and men of Mirlemont town" (Soprano chorus)
- No 3. "Dear Mary mother" – Prayer (Laine)
- No 4. "Who stands within?" – Quartet (Laine, Joan, Simon, The Devil)
- No 5. "Since it dwelt in that rock" – Recit and Song (The Devil)
- No 5a. Appearance of Laine (instrumental)

==== Scene 2 ====
- No 5b. After The Devil's song (instrumental)
- No 6. "The bells are ringing o'er Mirlemont Town" (Chorus)
- No 7. "My name is Crazy Jacqueline" – Duet (Jacqueline, The Devil)
- No 7a. Entrance of the Burgomaster and Crowd (Chorus)
- No 8. "Know ye all, both great and small" (Saida, Competitors, Philip, Nicholas, The Devil, Chorus)
- No 9. Finale Act I
  – "Go, bring forth old Simon's daughter" (Company)
  – "O turn thine eyes away" (Saida)

=== Act II ===
==== Scene 1 ====
- No 10. "With cards and dice" (Chorus)
- No 10a. Lute music
- No 11. "Though she should dance" – Scene with Eastern maidens (Saida, Philip, Chorus)
- No 12. "I love thee" – Duet (Laine, Philip)
- No 13. "I'll tell them what thou wast" (Laine, Saida, Philip, The Devil, Guntran, Three Lords, Chorus of Men)

==== Scene 2 ====
- No 13a. (instrumental)
- No 14. "Look yon" – Trio (Laine, Joan, Simon)
- No 15. "I would see a maid" – Duet (Simon and Joan)
- No 16. "Haste thee! haste thee!" – Quintet (Simon, Joan, Saida, Laine, The Devil)

==== Scene 3 ====
- No 17. "Up and Down" – Duet (Jacqueline, The Devil)
- No 18. Finale Act II – "There he stands" (Company)

=== Act III ===
==== Scene ====
- No 19. Part 1 – "An hour agone 'twas the moon that shone" (Laine)
- No 19. Part 2 – "The white moon lay on the ruined hay" (Laine)
- No 20. "Why dost thou sigh and moan?" (Jacqueline)
- No 21. "Mine, mine at last!" (Saida)
- No 21a. Offstage song – "With roses red they crowned her head" (Laine)
- No 22. "So all is lost for ever!" – Scena (Saida, The Devil)

==== Scene 2 ====
- No 22a. (instrumental)
- No 23. "O'er Mirlemont City the banners are flying" (Chorus and dance)
- No 23a. Exit of Guntran and crowd
- No 24. Finale Act III – "Hail to the lord of our land" (Company)

== Recordings ==
The Beauty Stone received its first recording in 1983 by Edinburgh's The Prince Consort, which was remastered and released by Pearl in 2003. In 2013, a fully professional recording of the complete score, including all the material cut after the premiere performance, was made at Hoddinott Hall, Cardiff, Wales, by the record company Chandos. The 2-CD set was released on 4 November 2013 and is also available as a digital download. Rory Macdonald conducts the BBC National Orchestra of Wales and BBC National Chorus of Wales, and principals include Elin Manahan Thomas (Laine), Toby Spence (Philip), Rebecca Evans (Saida), Alan Opie (The Devil), Stephen Gadd (Simon) and Richard Suart (Nicholas). A reviewer for MusicWeb International wrote: "This is subtle music that genuinely explores emotional depths and allows characters to develop. ... It is not exaggerating to suggest that it is a masterwork. ... [T]he sound quality of this recording is excellent. ... The singing is unbeatable, with all the soloists entering into the spirit of the story. What impressed me most was the orchestra".
