= Pauline Bush =

Pauline Bush may refer to:

- Pauline Bush (actress) (1886–1969), silent film actor in the early 1900s
- Pauline Joran (1870–1954), opera singer who married the Baron de Bush in 1899
- Pauline Robinson Bush, daughter of President George H.W. Bush
