= William, Baron de Bush =

British chemist

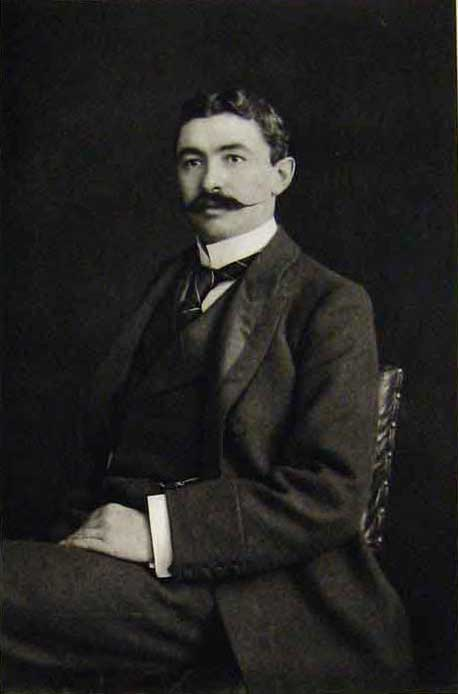
The Baron de Bush c.1894-95

William Ernest, Baron de Bush (1861–1903) was a British chemist, pharmaceutical businessman, and the only Freiherr von Bush in the nobility of Saxe-Coburg-Gotha. He was the husband of opera singer Pauline Joran.

== Life ==
William Ernest Bush was born in 1861 [his monument at Kensal Green says born 29 October 1860], in Hackney, London, the eldest son of William John Bush, the founder of W J Bush & Co Ltd, a London-based manufacturer of scents and flavourings, some for the pharmaceutical industry, founded in 1851 at Bishopsgate. After William John Bush died in 1889, he was succeeded by his son as head of the company.

William Ernest Bush was a fellow of the Chemical Society of London. In his professional capacity he acted as the British Juror for Chemicals at the Antwerp International Exhibition in 1885. In 1888 he stood as the President of Chemical Section and was the British Representative on the Supreme Jury of the Brussels Exhibition in the same year. This led to his being granted the title of Freiherr (Baron) von Bush by Ernest II, Duke of Saxe-Coburg and Gotha in ducal letters patent dated 25 December 1889. The Baron de Bush was granted royal license to use his title in the United Kingdom on 29 July 1896.

== Marriage and Death ==
On 6 December 1899, de Bush married Clara Pauline Joran (1870–1954), an American opera singer, daughter of Austrian-born Alois Anton Josef Albin Joran (1830-1901) later known in the USA as Louis Grund Joran of Freeport, Illinois, USA. They had one child, a daughter called Paulise Marie Louise.

On 24 July 1903, de Bush died after falling in front of an express train near Northampton while he and his wife were travelling up to Scotland. The title was declared to be extinct in 1910. However, Bush's daughter Paulise (1900–1975) became the Baroness de Bush, and was called "The Baby Baroness" due to being the youngest Baroness in England. As a Freiin, (the daughter of a Freiherr) Paulise had the right to be addressed as "Baroness", although this could not be passed to her descendants. Control of W J Bush & Co Ltd passed on to a younger brother, James Mortimer Bush (1863-1941).
