= Jones Hewson =

Welsh singer and actor

Jones Hewson

John Jones Hewson (2 September 1874 – 27 November 1902), credited as Jones Hewson, was a Welsh singer and actor known for his creation and portrayal of baritone roles with the D'Oyly Carte Opera Company from 1894 to 1901.

Hewson began in the chorus of the company, but soon moved up from smaller roles to larger ones on tour and then again from smaller roles to larger ones at the Savoy Theatre in London, earning critical praise. During his tenure with the company, he played more than two dozen of the baritone and bass-baritone roles in its repertory, and he created several roles in new Savoy Operas, including the Herald in The Grand Duke, Baron Vincentius in His Majesty, Nicholas Dircks in The Beauty Stone and the Earl of Newtown in The Emerald Isle. In 1901, his health deteriorated from tuberculosis; he and his family travelled to Australia, hoping that the climate would help him to recover, but he died at the age of 28.

== Biography ==
Hewson was born in Swansea, Wales. He was the son of John Jones Hewson (born 1829) and his wife Elizabeth (born 1833), proprietors of the Union Workhouse, Mount Pleasant, Swansea. His older sister was Jane (born 1868), and his younger brother was Howell (born 1878).

As the Herald in The Grand Duke, 1896

=== Early roles ===
Hewson grew up in Swansea. He joined the D'Oyly Carte Opera Company 1894 as a member of the chorus of the original production of Mirette at the Savoy Theatre in London. He soon went on tour with the company, doubling in the small roles of Captain Corcoran and Calynx in Utopia Limited and playing Francal in Mirette. In early 1895, he took the larger roles of Mr. Goldbury in Utopia, Gerard de Montigny in Mirette, Tommy Merton in The Vicar of Bray, and Ferdinand de Roxas in The Chieftain. He reverted to smaller roles later that year but took on the new bass-baritone roles of Sergeant Bouncer in Cox and Box that summer and Arac in Princess Ida in the autumn.

Back at the Savoy Theatre in November 1895, he played Pish-Tush in a revival of The Mikado. He soon added the role of Selworthy in the curtain raiser After All!, a role that he would play whenever this piece was revived at the Savoy thereafter. In March 1896, he created the role of the Herald in the original production of The Grand Duke at the Savoy Theatre, earning an encore from the Savoy audience and praise from the critics. Occasionally, he substituted for Rutland Barrington in the lead role of Ludwig in The Grand Duke. He again played Pish-Tush in the Savoy's revival of The Mikado in 1896–97 and sometimes played the title role or Pooh-Bah during the run.

=== Later roles ===
Hewson in his last role, Lord Newtown, Lord Lieutenant of Ireland, in The Emerald Isle (1901)

He next created the role of Baron Vincentius in His Majesty (1897), also substituting at times in the larger role of King Mopolio. Later the same year he played Sir Richard Cholmondeley in the first Savoy Theatre revival of The Yeomen of the Guard to good notices and added the role of the Rt. Hon. Claude Newcastle in the curtain raiser Old Sarah, another role that he repeated in revivals. In The Grand Duchess of Gerolstein (1897–98), he played Captain Hochheimer (and sometimes Baron Grog). He appeared at the benefit performance of Trial by Jury held for Nellie Farren in March 1898. Later that year at the Savoy, he played Luiz in the first Savoy revival of The Gondoliers, created the role of Nicholas Dircks in The Beauty Stone and played Sir Marmaduke Pointdextre in a revival of The Sorcerer. He also played the Counsel to the Plaintiff in Trial by Jury and Sir Marmaduke in The Sorcerer when they were revived together in the autumn of 1898. In the same year he married the actress Brenda Gibson; they had one son.

Hewson went back on tour at the beginning of 1899, reprising his role of Tommy Merton in The Vicar of Bray, and then toured in seven leading baritone roles in repertory: Captain Corcoran in H.M.S. Pinafore, the Pirate King in Pirates, Lord Mountararat in Iolanthe, the title role in The Mikado, Sergeant Meryll in Yeomen, Giuseppe in The Gondoliers and Mr. Goldbury in Utopia Limited, until August 1899, when he left the company for ten months.

He returned to the D'Oyly Carte Opera Company at the Savoy as a replacement for the role of Abdallah during the original production of The Rose of Persia in the summer of 1900. After this, he played the Pirate King in Pirates (1900) and Colonel Calverley in the first Savoy revival of Patience (1900–01), in each case earning approval from The Times. At a lecture by Sir Alexander Mackenzie on Sir Arthur Sullivan, given in May 1901, at which musical illustrations were given by members of the Savoy company, The Times singled out Hewson: "a special word of praise is due to Mr. Jones Hewson's delightful singing of "This Helmet, I Suppose" from Princess Ida". Hewson's last part for the D'Oyly Carte company was the Earl of Newtown, which he created in the original production of The Emerald Isle beginning in April 1901.

=== Early death ===
Hewson's health deteriorated from tuberculosis during the run of The Emerald Isle, and eventually he had to withdraw from the role. In October 1901 a benefit matinée was given for him at the Savoy by well-known performers including Rutland Barrington, Arthur Bourchier, Ada Reeve, Marie Tempest, Richard Temple, Violet Vanbrugh, and, in the second act of The Emerald Isle, the Savoy company of the time, led by Rosina Brandram. Hewson and his wife and young son sailed to Australia hoping "that the voyage and a dry climate [would] give him renewed strength". He made a brief recovery but relapsed. He returned to Britain, and he died on 27 November 1902 at the age of 28. He was buried in the Mumbles cemetery in South Wales.

== Sources ==
- Rollins, Cyril; R. John Witts (1962). The D'Oyly Carte Opera Company in Gilbert and Sullivan Operas: A Record of Productions, 1875–1961. London: Michael Joseph. OCLC 504581419.
