= Fred Billington =

English operatic singer and actor

Fred Billington

Fred Billington (1 July 1854 – 2 November 1917) was an English singer and actor, best known for his performances in baritone roles of the Savoy Operas with the D'Oyly Carte Opera Company. His career with the company began in 1879 and continued with brief interruptions until his death in 1917.

Billington seldom played in the West End but was a favourite with provincial audiences, chiefly in the roles created by Rutland Barrington. He created two roles in Savoy operas: the first was the Sergeant of Police in the one-off performance of The Pirates of Penzance given in December 1879 in Paignton (the day prior to the New York premiere) to establish Gilbert's and Sullivan's British copyright, and the second was King Mopolio in His Majesty at the Savoy Theatre in 1897.

== Life and career ==
Billington was born in Lockwood, near Huddersfield, Yorkshire. He began his career in the English provinces, singing at penny readings (inexpensive and respectable entertainments for working people).

=== 1880s ===
Billington joined the D'Oyly Carte Opera Company in 1879 playing the Boatswain in H.M.S. Pinafore in the London suburbs, and Policeman 100-A in a companion piece, Antony and Cleopatra, a one-act French farce adapted by Charles Selby in 1842. Soon he took over the larger role in Pinafore of Dick Deadeye, touring the English provinces. He created the role of Sergeant of Police in the Paignton performance of The Pirates of Penzance in 1879. He also had a part in Number One Round the Corner, a farce that played as a companion piece with Pinafore. In his early days with the company, there were complaints from reviewers that he tended to sing flat, but such complaints soon ceased. He became known for his excellent diction.

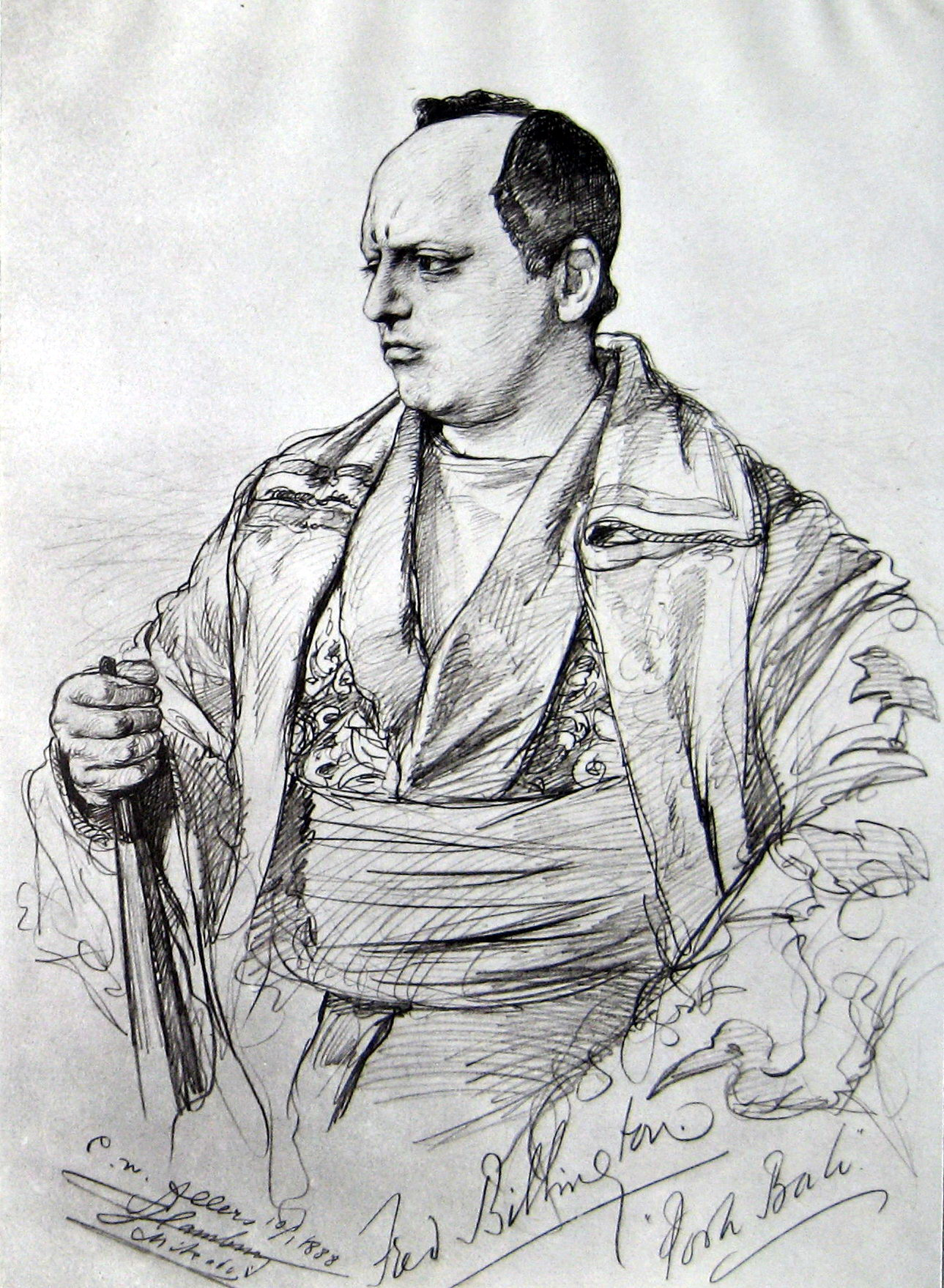
Billington as Pooh-Bah (1888)

In 1880, in D'Oyly Carte touring companies, Billington added the roles of the Notary and later Doctor Daly in The Sorcerer, and Sisyphus Twister in the curtain-raiser Six and Six. In 1881 and 1882 he took on the roles of the Pirate King in Pirates and Captain Corcoran in Pinafore. In 1882 and 1883, he toured as Derrick von Slous and Captain Hendrich Hudson in Farnie and Planquette's operetta Rip Van Winkle. He also played Private Willis in Iolanthe. In 1884, he played King Hildebrand in the tour of Princess Ida.

In 1885, Billington added to his list of roles the Learned Judge in Trial by Jury and Pooh-Bah in The Mikado. In August of that year, he travelled to New York for the American production of The Mikado, in a cast that included George Thorne (Ko-Ko), Geraldine Ulmar (Yum-Yum) and Courtice Pounds (Nanki-Poo). Returning from America in May 1886, he performed the roles of Corcoran and Pooh-Bah in the provinces and then Germany and Austria. He then returned to England in 1887 to rehearse the new Gilbert and Sullivan opera, Ruddygore, gave two matinee performances as Sir Despard Murgatroyd at the Savoy Theatre, and then sailed for New York again, to play Sir Despard in the American cast. This was followed by British and European tours of Ruddigore, The Mikado and Patience, in which he played Colonel Calverley. He also filled in for Rutland Barrington as Sir Despard briefly at the Savoy.

In 1888 and 1889, Billington toured as Deadeye, Sergeant of Police, Colonel Calverley, Pooh-Bah, Sergeant Meryll and later Wilfred Shadbolt in The Yeomen of the Guard. He then briefly left the D'Oyly Carte company to play Bragadoccio in Edward Jakobowski and Harry Paulton's comic opera Paola in Edinburgh, in a cast also including Leonora Braham. In 1890, to strengthen the New York cast of The Gondoliers, Carte sent several chosen players to America, including Billington as Don Alhambra. Billington next returned to Britain, touring in The Gondoliers and then The Mikado as Pooh-Bah and Yeomen as Shadbolt.

=== 1890 to 1917 ===
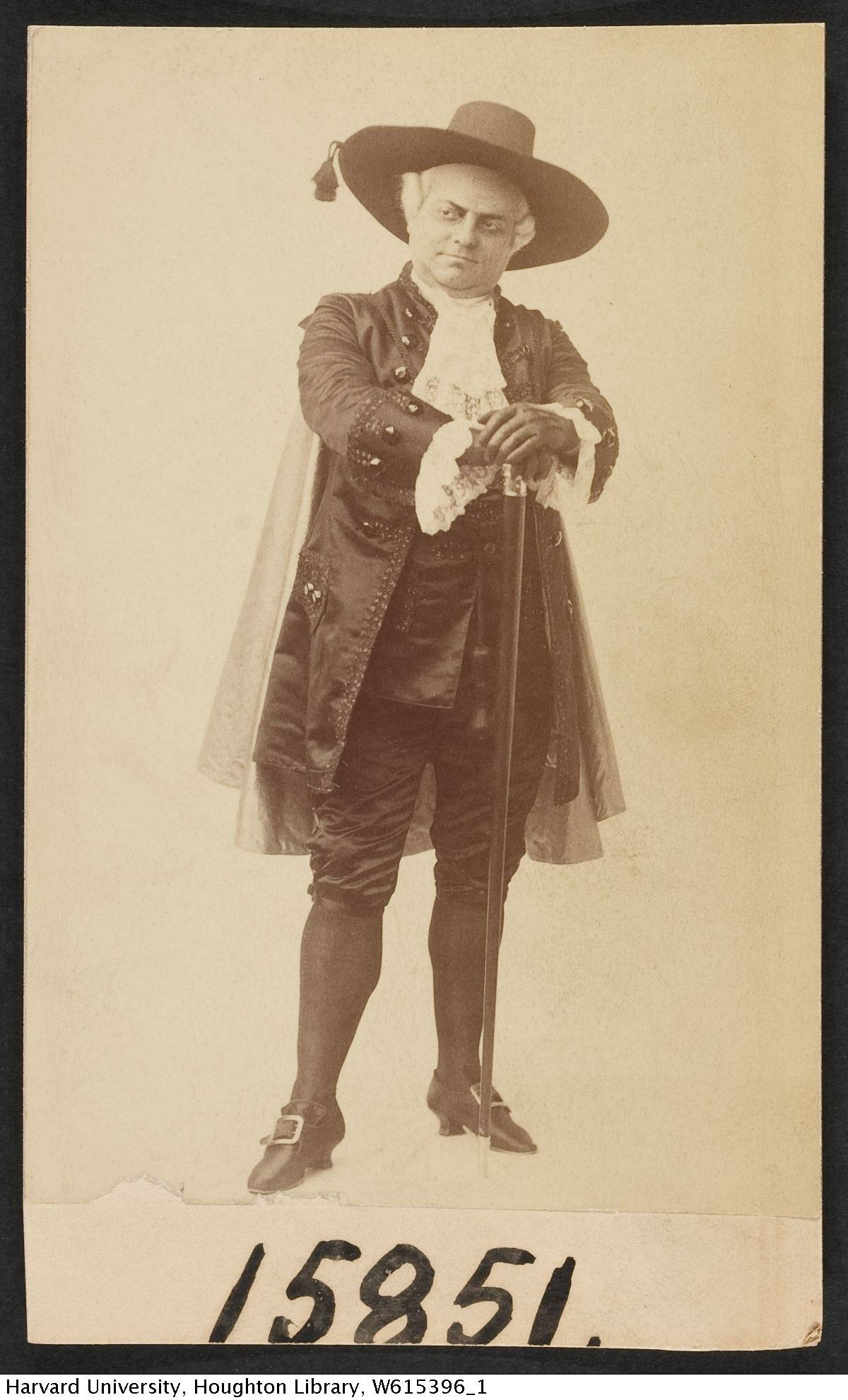
Billington as Don Alhambra

From the end of 1890 until his death in 1917, with few breaks, Billington performed with D'Oyly Carte's main touring company, in which his regular roles were the Judge (until 1904), Dr. Daly, Deadeye (until 1912), the Sergeant of Police, Archibald Grosvenor in Patience (a new role for him, which he played until 1905), Willis (until 1913), King Hildebrand, Pooh-Bah, Shadbolt, and Don Alhambra. He also played Punka in The Nautch Girl (1892), King Paramount in Utopia Limited (1898–1900), and Sultan Mahmoud in The Rose of Persia (1900–01), when those operas were included in the repertory. In 1891 he played Pooh-Bah in a command performance of The Mikado at Balmoral Castle for Queen Victoria and other members of the royal family.

In 1896, Billington was at the Savoy in place of Barrington as Pooh-Bah, and in early 1897 he was back at the Savoy briefly to create the role of King Mopolio VII in F.C. Burnand and Alexander Mackenzie's His Majesty. He left the Savoy in April of that year because of illness, and so he was unable to appear as Shadbolt in the 1897 revival of Yeomen as had been planned, the part going to Henry Lytton instead. After a lengthy convalescence, Billington returned to the touring company, where he remained for the rest of his career.

Lytton later remembered Billington's saying, in their shared dressing room, that his idea of the best way of dying was "a good dinner, a bottle of wine, a good cigar, a good joke, and – pop-off!" According to Lytton, the day after Billington had said this, he did almost precisely that at the Liverpool Street Hotel:

On 2 November 1917 Fred Billington travelled from Cambridge, where the Company was then playing, to London to have lunch in a hotel with Rupert Carte himself. It was a convivial but not necessarily the happiest of occasions. Carte had decided that, however sad it might be, the fact could no longer be disguised that Billington was now over the hill and that the time had come to ask him to retire; and towards the end of that lunch, it seems, he broke it to him that the current tour would be his last. After they had finished the meal Carte departed. Billington remained, chatting and reminiscing with one of the hotel waiters. Eventually, remarking that it was time to get back to the safety of Cambridge – "we've not had any Zeppelins there" – he rose, walked towards the hotel exit, and dropped dead.

Billington's funeral was at Highgate Cemetery on 8 November. He had no surviving family; he was a bachelor and his brother had died at Lockwood in 1882. The chief mourners were Courtice Pounds and George Thorne.
