= Ilka Pálmay =

Hungarian singer and actress

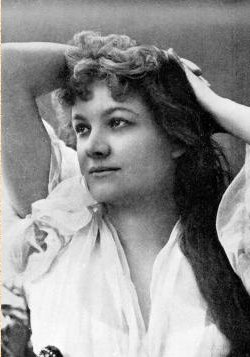
Ilka Pálmay as Julia Jellicoe, an English comedian, in The Grand Duke 1896.

Ilka Pálmay (often erroneously written Ilka von Pálmay; 21 September 1859 – 17 February 1945), born Ilona Petráss, was a Hungarian-born singer and actress. Pálmay began her stage career in Hungary by 1880, and by the early 1890s, she was creating leading roles in opera and operetta at the Theater an der Wien in Vienna. She was married to Austrian Count Eugen Kinsky in the early 1890s.

In 1895, Pálmay began to perform in London, and in 1896 she created the leading role of Julia in Gilbert and Sullivan's The Grand Duke. In 1897, Palmay returned to Hungary and spent most of the rest of her long and successful career in Hungary and Austria. She continued to perform until 1928.

== Life and career ==
Pálmay was born in Ungvar, in the Ung County of the Kingdom of Hungary, Austrian Empire (present-day Ukraine). She was married twice, first to actor-manager József Szigligeti (from 1877 to 1886), and then to Austrian Count Eugen Kinsky in the early 1890s, who maintained an estate at Althofen in Carinthia. Although she was often billed as "von Palmay" early in her career, she explained to The Sketch that the "von" "isn't right; von is German. In Hungary the y at the end of name means the same thing."

=== Early career ===
Pálmay began her stage career in Hungary (including Kassa, Budapest and Kolozsvár) by 1880 and played about two dozen roles in the 1880s, including Serpolette in Les Cloches de Corneville In the early 1890s, she performed at the Theater an der Wien in Vienna, where she created leading roles in Carl Zeller's Der Vogelhändler (1891) and Johann Strauss II's Fürstin Ninetta (1893). Soon, she was playing in Prague and the Unter den Linden Theater in Berlin. There, in 1893, she was cast in a German production of The Mikado to play the tenor hero, Nanki-Poo, in drag, and Sullivan unsuccessfully tried to stop the performances. Later, Pálmay was surprised to find out that no woman had ever appeared on stage at the Savoy Theatre dressed as a man.

As Julia Jellicoe

She later played the title role in La belle Hélène (Offenbach); Fiametta in Boccaccio (von Suppé); Denise in Mam'zelle Nitouche (Hervé; Nebántsvirág in Hungarian); Yvonne in The Pirate King (Planquette); Yum-Yum in The Mikado (Sullivan); the title role in The Grand Duchess of Gerolstein (Offenbach); Lisbeth in Rip Van Winkle (Planquette); and Bronislawa in A koldusdiák – The Beggar Student (Karl Millöcker).

In June 1895, Pálmay made her first appearance on the London stage as a guest artist with the Ducal Court Theare Company of Saxe-Coburg-Gotha as Christel in five performances of Der Vogelhändler at the Drury Lane Theatre. W. S. Gilbert saw her there and hired her to play the leading role of Julia Jellicoe in The Grand Duke, expanding the role to take advantage of her comic talents. Pálmay earned very favourable notices from the critics. She signed a two-year contract with the D'Oyly Carte Opera Company, but The Grand Duke ran for only four months in 1896. After it closed, she created the role of Felice in His Majesty at the Savoy in the spring of 1897. His Majesty gave Pálmay opportunities to display her talents as ballad singer, opera soprano and comedian, including the chance to sing in German, the language in which she usually performed. The song, "Das Kleine Fraülein Müffchen," is a German version of "Little Miss Muffet". Pitting the weak-voiced George Grossmith against the histrionic Pálmay may have speeded his departure from the production after only four performances. Pálmay next appeared as Elsie in the revival of The Yeomen of the Guard in the summer of 1897. Pleading ill health, she left D'Oyly Carte in July 1897.

=== Later years ===
Pálmay appeared in Vienna in 1898-99, but she spent most of her career in Budapest. In 1905, she appeared briefly in German-language theatre in New York, but soon returned to Hungary. In 1911, she won the national Hungarian theatre's honorary prize. Pálmay played many roles from opera and operetta during her long career, as noted below. In 1928, she retired from performing.

Pálmay recorded two songs in Vienna in 1900 and several in Budapest in 1903. The latter group of songs included one in English, "Butterfly," a folk song. She also recorded "Madrigal" from Ninoche and "A Simple Little String" from The Circus Girl. All of these can be heard on The Art of the Savoyard (Pearl GEMM CD 9991).

Writing as Countess Kinsky, Pálmay eventually published her memoirs in Hungarian. They were published in Berlin in 1911 in German translation as Meine Erinnerungen (My Memories). A chapter of the book about her days at the Savoy was translated into English by Andrew Lamb and was printed in the May and September 1972 issues of The Gilbert & Sullivan Journal. In the memoir, she describes plans by D'Oyly Carte to produce a musical version of Victorien Sardou's Madame Sans-Gêne in the company's 1897–1898 season, but those plans were cancelled.

Pálmay died in Budapest at the age of 85.

== Roles ==
As Yum-Yum in a German production of The Mikado

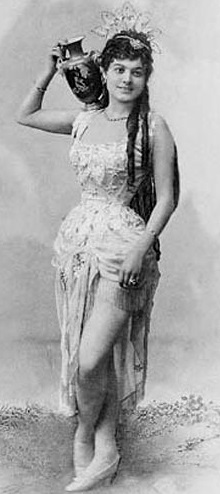
As Serpolette in Les Cloches de Corneville (1883 revival)

- Giacomo Puccini/David Belasco: Madama Butterfly – Cio-Cio-San
- Ferenc Csepreghy: Sárga csikó (Yellow Foal) – Erzsike (Elizabeth)
- Ferenc Csepreghy: A piros bugyelláris (The Red Purse) – Török Zsófi (Turkish girl Zsófi)
- Ferenc Csepreghy: A tót leány – Misu
- Gilbert and Sullivan: The Grand Duke – Julia Jellicoe (in English, London)
- Gilbert and Sullivan: The Yeomen of the Guard – Elsie Maynard
- Gilbert and Sullivan: The Mikado – Yum-Yum (in Germany)
- Károly Gerő: Vadgalamb (Culver) – Rica a pásztorlány (Rica the shepherdess)
- Charles Grisart: A királykisasszony bábui – Les Poupées de l'Infante – main role
- Hervé: Mam'zelle Nitouche (Nebántsvirág in Hungarian) – Denise
- Hennequin & Millaud: Niniche – Niniche
- Charles Lecocq: Nap és hold (Le Jour et la Nuit) – Manola
- Charles Lecocq: The Gardener Girl – Micaela
- Alexander MacKenzie: His Majesty – Felice (in English, London)
- André Messager: A beárni leány – La Béarnaise – Jacquette
- Karl Millöcker: A koldusdiák (Der Bettelstudent – The Beggar Student) – Bronislawa
- Karl Millöcker: Gasparone – Carlotta
- Jacques Offenbach: La Grande-Duchesse de Gérolstein (The Grand Duchess of Gérolstein) – the title role
- Jacques Offenbach: La belle Hélène – Hélène
- Jacques Offenbach: Orpheus in the Underworld – Eurydice
- Robert Planquette: Rip van Winkle – Lisbeth
- Robert Planquette: The Pirate King – Yvonne
- Robert Planquette: Les Cloches de Corneville – Serpolette, the good-for-nothing.
- Robert Planquette: A komédiás hercegnő; La princesse Colombine – main role
- Jenő Rákosi: Magdolna – Magda
- Jenő Rákosi: Szélháziak – Cseresnyés Alfréd, the lawyer
- Franz von Suppé: Boccaccio – Fiametta
- Johann Strauss II: The Gypsy Baron – Barinkay
- Johann Strauss II: Das Spitzentuch der Königin (The Queen's Lace Handkerchief) – main role
- Johann Strauss II: Fürstin Ninetta (Princess Ninetta) - title role
- Franz Schubert - Besté: Három a kislány – Tscöllné
- Joseph Szigeti: Csókon szerzett vőlegény – Ábrai Irén színésznő
- Carl Zeller: Der Vogelhändler - Christel (Milka in Hungarian)
- Émile Zola: Nana (based on Zola's novel) – main role
