= Pauline Joran =

American opera singer

Pauline Joran, around 1898

Pauline Joran (3 August 1870 – 13 August 1954) was an American opera singer who lived and performed and mostly in the UK. She was the wife of William Ernest Bush, the first and last Baron de Bush, and mother of Paulise de Bush, who became the youngest baroness in England, known as the "Baby Baroness". She is remembered for creating the role of Saida in Arthur Sullivan's 1898 Savoy opera The Beauty Stone.

After a touring career as a child violinist, playing together with her pianist sisters in the U.S. and abroad in the 1880s, Joran began an opera career in England, which lasted through the 1890s. With her marriage to Baron de Bush in 1899, she retired from the stage. He was killed in an accident in 1903, and Joran lived quietly for some years, returning to society by 1910 as a hostess and patroness of music.

== Early life ==
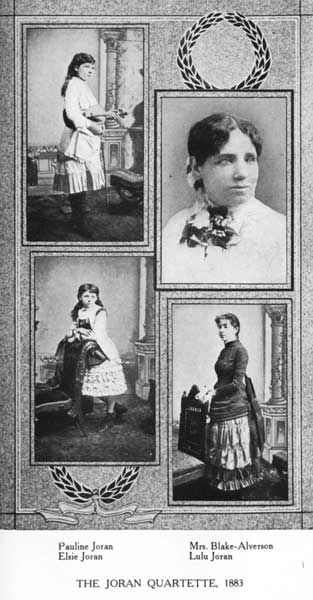
The Joran Quartet, circa 1884.

Joran was born Clara Pauline Joran in Freeport, Illinois, the second of three daughters of Vienna-born Louis Grund Joran (1830–1901), a painter, and his wife, Mary Elizabeth née Askew (1850–1933). The family moved to California around 1877, and her parents divorced in 1879. She made her violin debut in 1880 and soon formed a concert troupe with her pianist sisters, Louise Marie ("Lula", born 1868) and Henrietta ("Elise", 1873–1952). Joran underwent preliminary voice training in 1884–85 with the singer Margaret Blake-Alverson, who had described her as singing with taste and feeling, as well as being a talented violinist. In 1884, the sisters performed for the famous opera singer Adelina Patti. Their director was Marie C. Hyde, who also acted as an accompanist. The children's talents were much admired at the time, especially their absolute pitch ability to tell the notes of chords sounded, even while blindfolded. The troupe visited California, Hawaii and, by 1886, Australia. In Hawaii, they played for the last king, Kalākaua. They returned to California in 1887 and then performed in Mexico and elsewhere. By 1890, the Jorans travelled to Europe to further their musical studies.

== Operatic career ==
In London, as a debutante, Joran was recommended to the conductor Wilhelm Ganz. As a member of the New Meistersingers' Club in St James's Street, Ganz arranged musical soirees for which he held auditions for potential performers. He found that Joran played the violin well, and that she had a lovely soprano voice. Ganz advised her to give up playing the violin and take to the operatic stage, as she was a very good-looking young woman with a beautiful figure. Nevertheless, Joran did not abandon the violin, playing Mendelssohn's G minor Violin Concerto in Liverpool in 1893 and, as late as December 1896, giving a concert at St James's Hall, London, as both violinist and vocalist.

Saida (Joran) and Simon (Henry Lytton) in The Beauty Stone.

Meanwhile, with a recommendation from Ganz, Joran was engaged by the Carl Rosa Opera Company, making her London stage debut in the mezzo-soprano roles of Lola in Cavalleria rusticana and Beppe in L'amico Fritz, on tour in 1892 at, among others, the Prince's Theatre, Manchester. The latter required her to sing and play the violin simultaneously, enabling her to showcase both her talents. The Manchester Guardian wrote that she played the violin "like an angel" and then surprised her audience with the excellence of her singing. Another tour with Carl Rosa followed, and Joran was given the opportunity to play several larger roles.

She was soon engaged by Sir Augustus Harris to sing roles at the Royal Opera House, Covent Garden, at the Theatre Royal, Drury Lane, and on tour. Joran's roles over the next four years included Marguerite in Faust, the title role in Carmen, Eurydice in Orfeo, Nedda in Pagliacci, Alice Ford in Falstaff, Anita in La Navarraise, Lady Pamela in Fra Diavolo, and roles in Maritana, Cavalleria rusticana, Die Walküre, Roméo et Juliette, The Lady of Longford, as well as the role of Gertrude in an opera bouffe called Il Maestro di Cappella at the Prince of Wales's Theatre. An 1896 review said of her, "Joran is a bewitching Carmen. She sings and acts the part to the life. She is a true artiste." She also sang in Italy during 1895–96 and on the concert stage.

Joran created the role of Saida in the premiere of The Beauty Stone, by Arthur Sullivan, A. W. Pinero and J. Comyns Carr, at the Savoy Theatre, on May 28, 1898. She was one of two opera singers imported into the regular Savoy cast, which included Henry Lytton (who became her lifelong friend), at increased salaries to tackle the music, which was considered more vocally challenging than other Savoy operas. Cunningham Bridgeman deemed her "unquestionably the finest prima donna ever seen on the Savoy stage". The Times wrote, "Musically, the chief honours of the performance, such as they are, fall to Miss Pauline Joran's share; she sings the music of Saida with remarkable finish and success, and her acting is really powerful and full of suggestion." After this, in early 1899, she reprised her roles in Faust, Pagliacci, and Cavalleria rusticana at the Lyceum Theatre, London.

== Marriage and later years ==
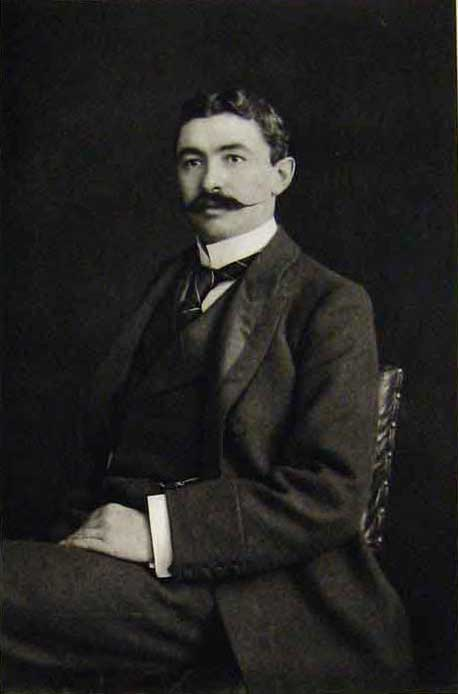
The Baron de Bush c.1894-95

On 6 December 1899, Joran married William Ernest Bush, the Baron de Bush, and retired from performing. They had a daughter together, Paulise Marie Louise (1900–1975). In March 1903 Joran made a brief return to performing, singing at a concert at St. James's Hall, presented by her sister, the pianist Elise Joran. On 24 July that year, the Baron de Bush was killed after falling in front of an express train near Northampton, while he and his wife were travelling to Scotland. This left their daughter the Baroness de Bush, England's youngest Baroness.

Joran lived quietly for several years, but by 1910, she had re-entered social life. She was a member of the Society of American Women in London and attended the events they hosted, such as a farewell dinner held for Charles W. Fairbanks in London on March 12, 1910. By this time, she was out of mourning, as she was noted to be wearing fraise (strawberry pink). She made her grand opera debut in Milan in 1910 "under Sonzogno, singing ... Santuzza and Nedda with the greatest success". She became a well-known hostess and patroness of music, presenting private concerts at her house in the Regent's Park, featuring well-known singers and young performers.

Joran died in 1954 in London. She was survived by her daughter Paulise, an active collector of historical dress, who bequeathed her collection to the National Trust. The collection, including some of Joran's garments, is exhibited at Killerton House, Broadclyst, near Exeter.
