= The Grand Duke =

Comic opera by Gilbert and Sullivan

An early poster for The Grand Duke

The Grand Duke; or, The Statutory Duel, is the final Savoy Opera written by librettist W. S. Gilbert and composer Arthur Sullivan, their fourteenth and last opera together. It premiered at the Savoy Theatre on 7 March 1896, and ran for 123 performances. Despite a successful opening night, the production had a relatively short run and was the partnership's only financial failure, and the two men never worked together again. In recent decades, the opera has been revived professionally, first in the US and then in the UK.

In The Grand Duke, Gilbert and Sullivan come full circle, back to the theme of their first collaboration, Thespis: a troupe of actors taking political power. The plot hinges on the mis-interpretation of a 100-year-old law regarding statutory duels (decided by drawing cards). The baffled leading comedian of the troupe, Ludwig, spearheads the rebellion against the hypochondriac, miserly Grand Duke and becomes engaged to four different women before the plot is resolved. The frugality and phoniness of the wealthy classes and the nobility are lampooned and, as in Princess Ida, The Mikado, The Gondoliers, and Utopia, Limited, the foreign setting emboldens Gilbert to use some particularly pointed satire. Sullivan's varied score includes lilting Viennese waltz music.

== Background ==
During the production of Gilbert and Sullivan's 1889 comic opera, The Gondoliers, Gilbert became embroiled in a legal dispute with producer Richard D'Oyly Carte over the cost of a new carpet for the Savoy Theatre and, more generally, over the accounting for expenses of the Gilbert and Sullivan partnership. Sullivan sided with Carte (who was about to produce Sullivan's grand opera, Ivanhoe), and the partnership disbanded. After The Gondoliers closed in 1891, Gilbert withdrew the performance rights to his libretti and vowed to write no more operas for the Savoy. The lawsuit left Gilbert and Sullivan somewhat embittered, and though they finally collaborated on two more works, these suffered from a less collegial working relationship than the two men had typically enjoyed while writing earlier operas.

Gilbert and Sullivan's penultimate opera, Utopia, Limited (1893), was a very modest success compared with their earlier collaborations. It introduced Gilbert's last protégée, Nancy McIntosh, as the heroine, who received generally unfavourable press. Sullivan refused to write another piece if she was to take part in it. Discussions over her playing the role of Yum-Yum in a proposed revival of The Mikado led to another row between Gilbert and Sullivan that prevented the revival, and Gilbert's insistence upon her appearing in his 1894 opera, His Excellency, caused Sullivan to refuse to set the piece. After His Excellency closed in April 1895, McIntosh wrote to Sullivan informing him that she planned to return to concert singing, and so the obstacle to his further collaboration with Gilbert was removed. Meanwhile, Sullivan had written a comic opera for the Savoy Theatre with F. C. Burnand, The Chieftain, but that had closed in March 1895.

=== Genesis ===
Ilka Pálmay as Julia Jellicoe

Gilbert had begun working on the story of The Grand Duke in late 1894. Elements of the plot were based on several antecedents including "The Duke's Dilemma" (1853), a short story by Tom Taylor, published in Blackwood's Magazine, about a poor duke who hires French actors to play courtiers to impress his rich fiancée. The story also contains the germ of the character of Ernest. In 1888, "The Duke's Dilemma" was adapted as The Prima Donna, a comic opera by H. B. Farnie that contains other details seen in The Grand Duke, including the Shakespearean costumes, a prince and princess who make a theatrical entrance. In addition, the plot shows similarities with the first Gilbert and Sullivan opera, Thespis, in which a company of actors gain political power. Gilbert read a sketch of the plot to Sullivan on 8 August 1895, and Sullivan wrote on 11 August to say that he would be pleased to write the music, calling Gilbert's plot sketch "as clear and bright as possible". The theme of Ernest (and then Rudolph) being legally dead while still physically alive was used in earlier works by Gilbert and, separately by Sullivan, for example Tom Cobb (1875) and Cox and Box (1867). Gilbert sold the libretto of the new piece to Carte and Sullivan for £5,000, and so he took no risk as to whether or not it would succeed.

Mr. and Mrs. Carte hired a new soprano, the Hungarian Ilka Pálmay, who had recently arrived in England and quickly made a favourable impression on London audiences and critics with her charming personality. Gilbert devised a new plot line revolving around Pálmay, making her character, Julia, an English actress among a company of German actors, with the topsy-turvy conceit that her "strong English accent" was forgiven by her audiences because of her great dramatic artistry. Rutland Barrington's role, Ludwig, became the leading comedian of the theatrical company and the central role in the opera. Gilbert had paired the title character with contralto Rosina Brandram, causing Sullivan to suggest some different pairings of the characters, but Gilbert and the Cartes disagreed; Mrs. Carte went so far as to caution Sullivan that his ideas would upset the casting. Unhappily for Gilbert, three of his usual principal players, George Grossmith, Richard Temple and Jessie Bond, who he had originally thought would play the title character, the prince and the princess, all left the company before rehearsals began for The Grand Duke, and so he reduced the size of these roles, further changing his original conception.

While Gilbert and Sullivan finished writing the show, the Cartes produced a revival of The Mikado at the Savoy Theatre, opening on 6 November 1895. Rehearsals for The Grand Duke began in January. Sullivan wrote the overture himself, effectively weaving together some of the best melodies in the opera. Gilbert made a few additional changes to the libretto shortly before opening night to avoid giving offense to Kaiser Wilhelm, possibly at the request of Sullivan, who valued the Kaiser's friendship. These included changing the name of the title character from Wilhelm to Rudolph.

=== Original production and reception ===
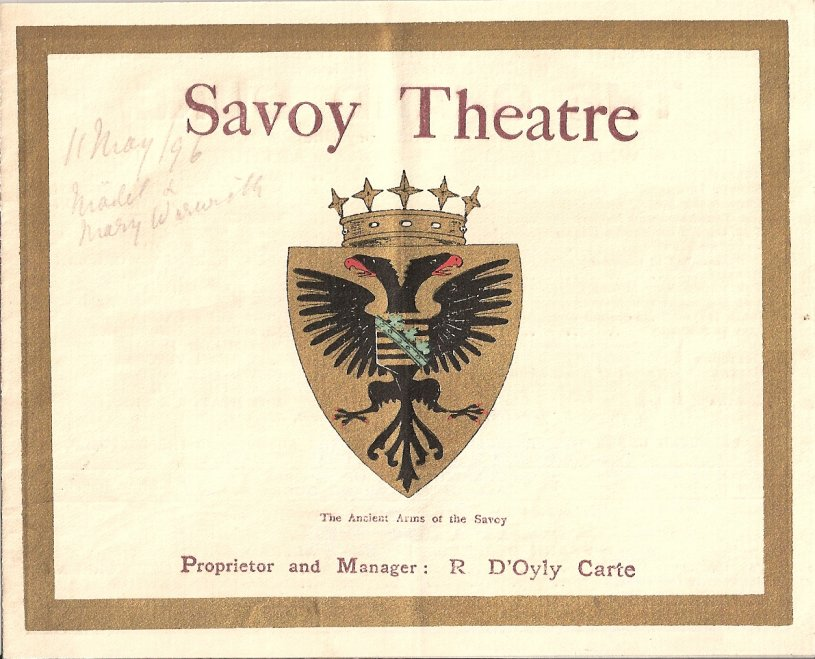
Programme from the original production of The Grand Duke

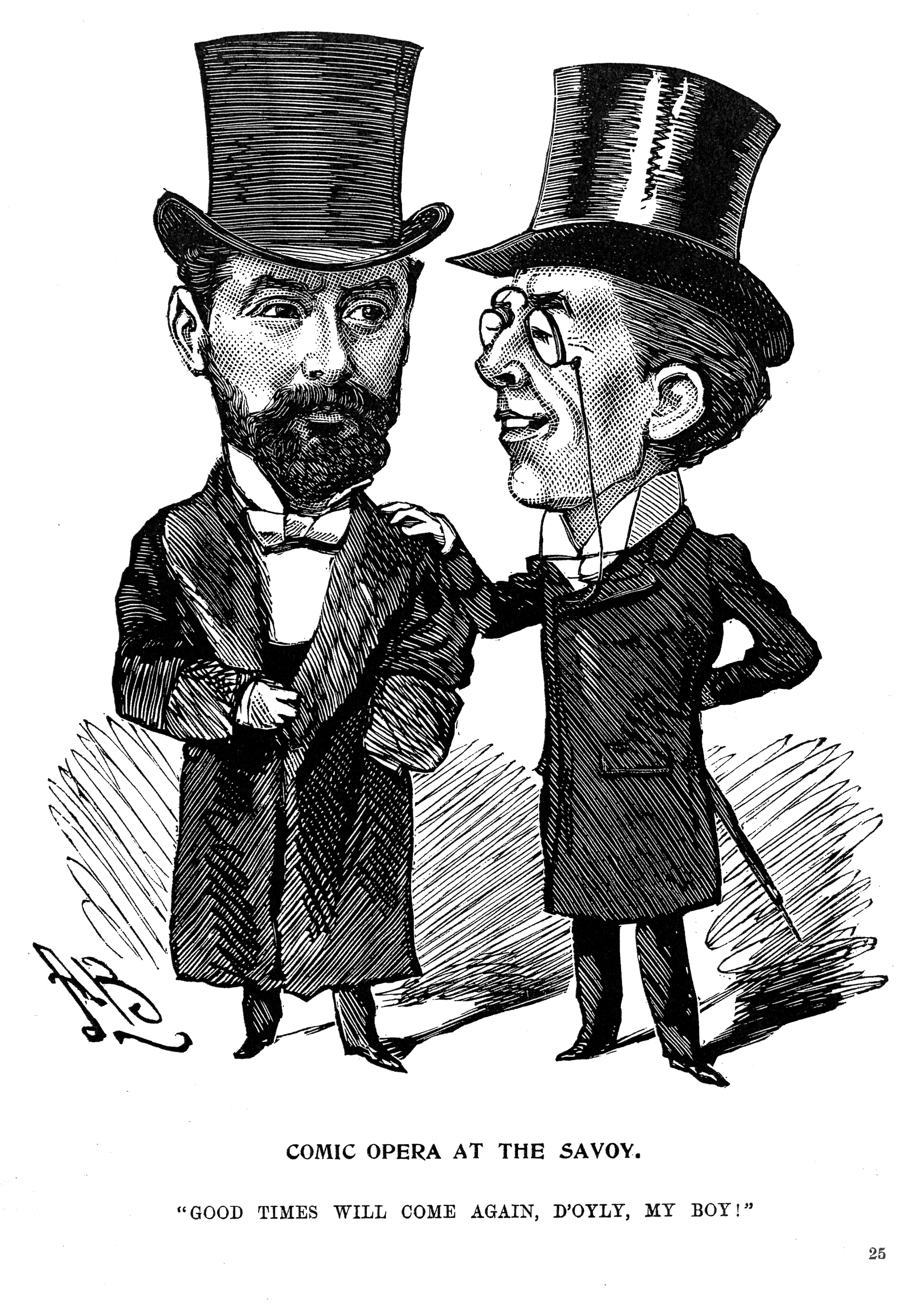
Grossmith comforts Carte after failure of The Grand Duke

The opera premiered on 7 March 1896, and Sullivan conducted the orchestra, as he always did on opening nights. Costumes were by Percy Anderson. The opening night was a decided success, and the critics praised Gilbert's direction, Pálmay's singing and acting, Walter Passmore as Rudolph, and the cast in general. There were some reservations, however. The Times's review of the opening night's performance said:

The Grand Duke is not by any means another Mikado, and, though it is far from being the least attractive of the series, signs are not wanting that the rich vein which the collaborators and their various followers have worked for so many years is at last dangerously near exhaustion. This time the libretto is very conspicuously inferior to the music. There are still a number of excellent songs, but the dialogue seems to have lost much of its crispness, the turning-point of what plot there is requires considerable intellectual application before it can be thoroughly grasped, and some of the jests are beaten out terribly thin.

The reviewer stated that the jokes might be funnier if the dialogue between them were "compressed". The Manchester Guardian concurred: "Mr. Gilbert's tendency to over-elaboration has nowhere shown itself so obtrusively.... Mr. Gilbert has introduced too many whimsical ideas which practically bear no relation to the story proper". Although the audience greeted the new piece enthusiastically, neither partner was satisfied. Sullivan wrote in his diary, "Parts of it dragged a little – dialogue too redundant but success great and genuine I think.... Thank God opera is finished & out." Gilbert wrote to his friend, Mrs. Bram Stoker: "I'm not at all a proud Mother, and I never want to see this ugly misshapen little brat again."

After the opening night, Sullivan left to recuperate in Monte Carlo. Gilbert reacted to the reviews by making cuts in the opera. These included three songs in Act II, and commentators have questioned the wisdom of these particular cuts, especially the Baroness's drinking song and the Prince's roulette song. The Grand Duke closed after 123 performances on 11 July 1896, Gilbert and Sullivan's only financial failure. It toured the British provinces for a year and was produced in Germany on 20 May 1896 at the Unter den Linden Theatre in Berlin and on a D'Oyly Carte tour of South Africa the same year. After this, it disappeared from the professional repertory, although Gilbert considered reviving it in 1909.

== Analysis and subsequent history ==
The Grand Duke is longer than most of the earlier Gilbert and Sullivan operas, and more of the libretto is devoted to dialogue. Gilbert's cutting of parts of the opera after the opening night did not prevent it from having a shorter run than any of the earlier collaborations since Trial by Jury. In addition to whatever weaknesses the show had, as compared with earlier Gilbert and Sullivan pieces, the taste of the London theatregoing public had shifted away from comic opera to musical comedies, such as A Gaiety Girl (1893), The Shop Girl (1894) and An Artist's Model (1895), which were to dominate the London stage through World War I. One of the most successful musical comedies of the 1890s, The Geisha (1896), competed directly against The Grand Duke and was by far the greater success.

"Ludwig and his Julia are mated."

After its original production, The Grand Duke was not revived by the D'Oyly Carte Opera Company until 1975 (and then only in concert), and performances by other companies have been less frequent than most of the other Gilbert and Sullivan operas. 20th century critics dismissed the work. For example, H. M. Walbrook wrote in 1921, "It reads like the work of a tired man. ... There is his manner but not his wit, his lyrical fluency but not his charm. ... [For] the most part, the lyrics were uninspiring and the melodies uninspired." Of Gilbert's work in the opera, Isaac Goldberg opined, "the old self-censorship has relaxed", and of Sullivan's he concludes, "his grip upon the text was relaxing; he pays less attention to the words, setting them with less regard than formerly to their natural rhythms".

In the first half of the 20th century, The Grand Duke was produced occasionally by amateur companies, including the Savoy Company in Philadelphia and the Blue Hill Troupe in New York City, who pride themselves on producing all of the Gilbert and Sullivan operas. In America, it was mounted by professional companies, including the American Savoyards, beginning in 1959, and the Light Opera of Manhattan in the 1970s and 1980s. The BBC assembled a cast to broadcast the opera (together with the rest of the Gilbert and Sullivan series) in 1966 (led by former D'Oyly Carte comic Peter Pratt) and again in 1989. Of a 1962 production by The Lyric Theater Company of Washington, D.C., The Washington Post wrote, "the difficulties were worth surmounting, for the work is a delight. ... Throughout the work are echoes of their earlier and more successful collaborations, but Pfennig Halbpfennig retains a flavor all its own."

Since the D'Oyly Carte Opera Company released its recording of the piece in 1976, The Grand Duke has been produced more frequently. The New York Gilbert and Sullivan Players produced a concert version in 1995 and a full production in 2011. Writer Marc Shepherd concluded that the work "is full of bright comic situations and Gilbert's characteristic topsy-turvy wit. Sullivan's contribution has been considered first-rate from the beginning. The opera shows him branching out into a more harmonically adventurous Continental operetta style." The first fully staged professional revival in the UK took place in 2012 at the Finborough Theatre in London, starring Richard Suart in the title role, with a reduced cast and two-piano accompaniment. The Gilbert and Sullivan Opera Company presented a full-scale professional production with orchestra at the International Gilbert and Sullivan Festival in Buxton later in 2012. Other productions accelerated in the UK, US and elsewhere, and the Sir Arthur Sullivan Society reported in 2024 that "In the present century, there are something like half a dozen amateur [UK] Grand Dukes each year." Forbear! Theatre's production at the Drayton Arms Theatre, London, in 2024 makes it the first professional company in the UK to have presented two staged productions of the opera since the D'Oyly Carte.

== Roles and casting ==
Charles Kenningham as Ernest

The original and 1975 principal cast were as follows:

| Role | Voice | 1896 | 1975 |
|---|---|---|---|
| Rudolph, Grand Duke of Pfennig-Halbpfennig | comic baritone | Walter Passmore | John Reed |
| Ernest Dummkopf, a Theatrical Manager | tenor | Charles Kenningham | Colin Wright |
| Ludwig, his Leading Comedian | baritone | Rutland Barrington | Kenneth Sandford |
| Dr. Tannhäuser, a Notary | high baritone | Scott Russell | Michael Rayner |
| The Prince of Monte Carlo | baritone | R. Scott Fishe | John Ayldon |
| Viscount Mentone | speaking role | E. Carlton | Jeffrey Cresswell |
| Ben Hashbaz, a costumier | any male voice | C. H. Workman | Jon Ellison |
| Herald | baritone | Jones Hewson | John Broad |
| The Princess of Monte Carlo, betrothed to Rudolph | soprano | Emmie Owen | Pamela Field |
| The Baroness von Krakenfeldt, betrothed to Rudolph | contralto | Rosina Brandram | Lyndsie Holland |
| Julia Jellicoe, an English Comedienne | soprano | Ilka Pálmay | Julia Goss |
| Lisa, a Soubrette | mezzo-soprano | Florence Perry | Judi Merri |
| Members of Ernest Dummkopf's Company: Olga | — | Mildred Baker | Marjorie Williams |
| Gretchen | — | Ruth Vincent | Anne Egglestone |
| Bertha | — | Jessie Rose | Beti Lloyd-Jones |
| Elsa | — | Ethel Wilson | Patricia Leonard |
| Martha | — | Beatrice Perry | Rosalind Griffiths |
Chorus of Chamberlains, Nobles, Actors, Actresses, etc.

== Synopsis ==
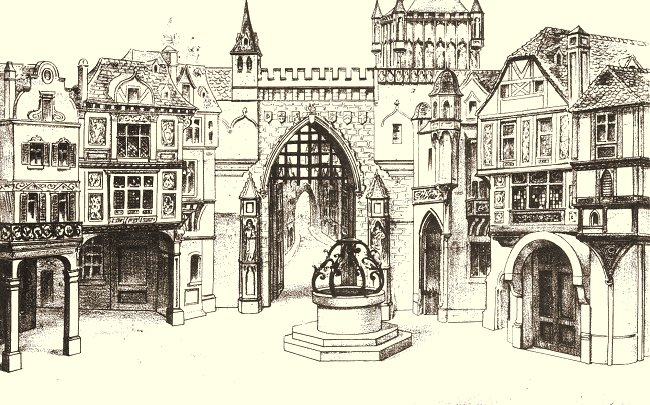
Drawing of the original Act I set

The Grand Duke is set in the Grand Duchy of Pfennig-Halbpfennig in 1750.

=== Act I ===
In the market square in the capital city, Speisesaal, Ernest Dummkopf's theatrical company is ready to open their production of Troilus and Cressida that night. They also prepare to celebrate the wedding of the troupe's leading comedian, Ludwig, to Lisa, a soubrette of the company. The marriage cannot take place, however, as there are no parsons available in the city: all clerics have been summoned to the palace by the Grand Duke of Pfennig-Halbpfennig to discuss his own forthcoming marriage. Everyone has grown to resent the Grand Duke, and all of the company had already become members of a plot to blow him up with dynamite and place a new man on the throne. The secret sign by which members of the conspiracy recognise each other is to eat a sausage roll – a food of which they are by now all heartily sick.

It is clear that Ernest will win the election which is to follow the coup and become Grand Duke, which troubles Julia Jellicoe, a famous English comedian. As leading lady of the company, she is bound by contract to play the leading female role in any production. If Ernest, the manager, becomes the Grand Duke, she reasons that she will have to be the Grand Duchess. She says that this is a repugnant prospect to her (though it is a delightful one to Ernest), but that she will play the part in a professional manner.

Note: Gilbert supplied a topsy-turvy twist by writing Julia's dialogue in a German accent, since she is the only English character in Ernest's company; all of the Germans speak with an English accent. The first Julia, Ilka Pálmay, was Hungarian but performed mostly in German. Modern productions do not always carry out this idea. For instance, in the 1976 D'Oyly Carte recording (which did not include the dialogue), the singer playing Julia did not affect a German accent.

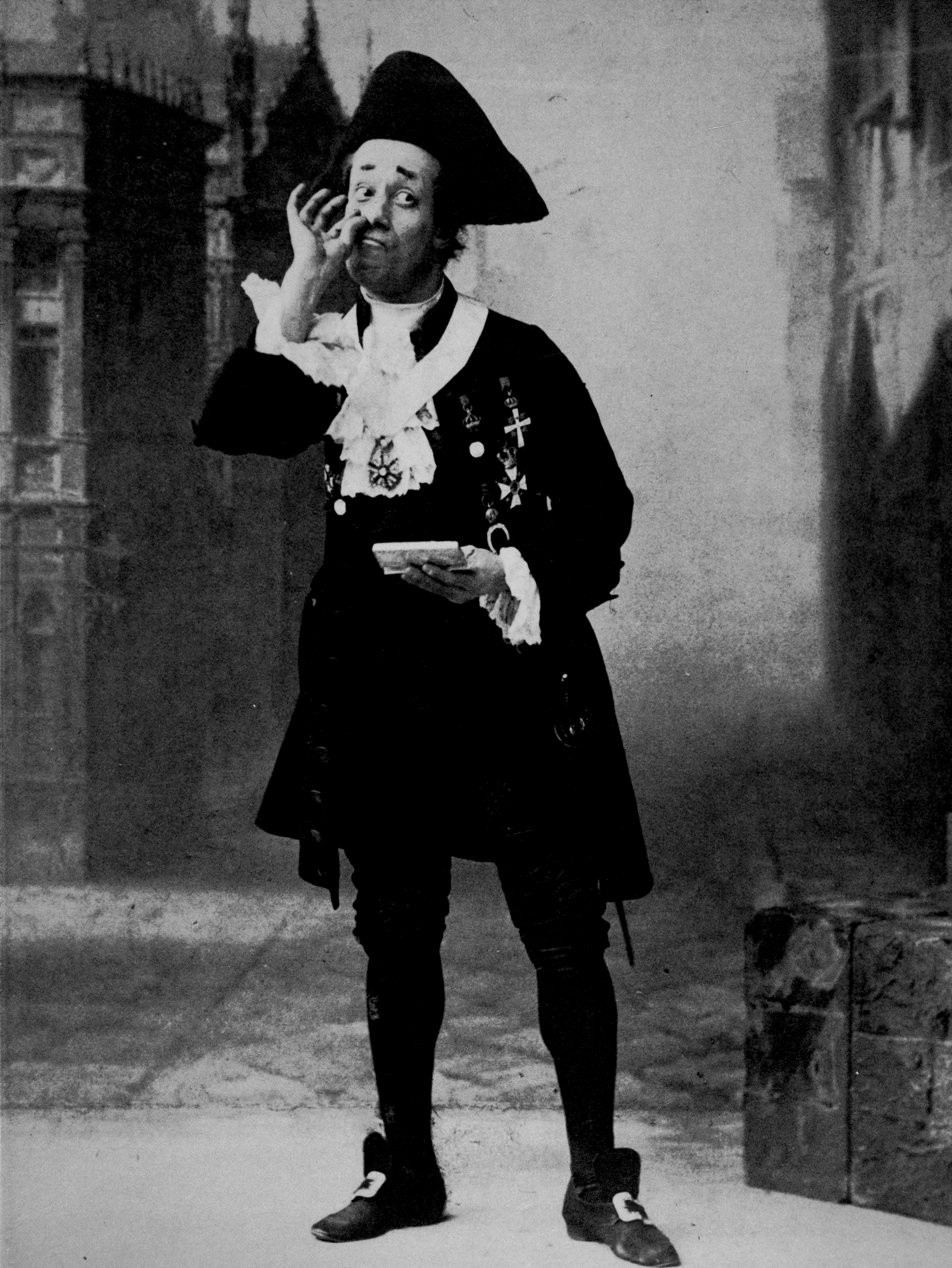
Passmore as Rudolph

Meanwhile, Ludwig has met a man who returned his secret salute by eating three sausage rolls. Ludwig believed him to be a member of the conspiracy and told him all the details; only then did he realise that he had revealed the entire plot to the Grand Duke's private detective. The company are aghast, believing they are doomed once the Grand Duke learns of the plot. The company's notary, Dr. Tannhäuser, appears and offers a solution. He explains that a century ago the Grand Duke of the time, concerned about the loss of life in duelling, had created the statutory duel: the duellers draw cards, and the one who draws the lower card loses. He becomes legally dead, and the winner takes over his position: his property, responsibilities and debts. The law regulating statutory duels, like all laws of Pfennig-Halbpfennig, lasts for one hundred years unless revived, and it is to lapse tomorrow.

Tannhäuser counsels Ernest and Ludwig to fight a statutory duel immediately: the loser will be legally dead, and the survivor can go to the Duke and confess the whole plot. As informer he will be spared, while the other party will be dead and so beyond retribution. The next day, the loser will come to life when the law lapses, but since death expunges crime, his character will be unstained. Ernest and Ludwig promptly "fight" a statutory duel: Ernest draws a king, but Ludwig draws an ace and is declared the winner.

They leave, and the miserly yet pompous and moralistic Grand Duke Rudolph appears, heralded by his corps of chamberlains. He instructs them in the arrangements for his wedding the next day to the rich, but also miserly, Baroness Caroline von Krakenfeldt. She arrives, handing him a letter from his detective, and they sing about how exactly in agreement are their ideas on economy. Caroline is disconcerted that Rudolph insists on courting her in the market square, but he explains that he has made a law compelling couples to do all courting in the square so as to increase the value of his properties around the square. She approves of this example of economy.

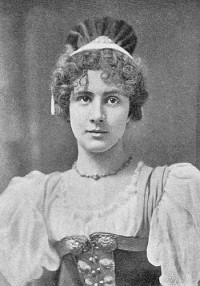
Florence Perry as Lisa

Caroline is also upset by a newspaper article which says that Rudolph was betrothed in infancy to the Princess of Monte Carlo, but he explains that the engagement is "practically off." The betrothal lapses when the Princess reaches the age of twenty-one, which will happen tomorrow, and her father, the Prince, dares not venture out of his house for fear of being arrested by his creditors.

Once he is alone, Rudolph reads the letter and learns about the plot to blow him up. Ludwig arrives, intent on denouncing the plot to him. Before he can do so, Rudolph declares that he would give anything to avoid being blown up the next day, and Ludwig sees a way out. He feigns patriotism and suggests that the two engage in a statutory duel. He explains that they will hide cards up their sleeves, guaranteeing victory to Ludwig. When the plot unfolds, Ludwig will bear the brunt of it. The next day, when the Act authorizing statutory duels expires, Rudolph can come back to life unharmed. Although Rudolph is sceptical, he accepts Ludwig's proposal.

Rudolph and Ludwig summon the city's inhabitants. They stage a mock quarrel and conduct the rigged statutory duel as planned: Rudolph's king is beaten by Ludwig's ace, making Ludwig the Grand Duke. Rudolph's subjects berate him with scorn, and he retreats, threatening revenge. Ludwig uses his new powers to extend the Act for another hundred years, thus ensuring that neither Rudolph nor Ernest can come back to life.

Julia Jellicoe appears and once again asserts that, as leading lady, she must take the leading role of the Grand Duchess. Lisa leaves in tears. Julia points out that if she and Ludwig are to rule over a Grand Ducal court, they need to be dressed more impressively than their everyday clothes will allow. Ludwig recalls that they have a complete set of brand-new costumes for Troilus and Cressida, which they can use to "upraise the dead old days of Athens in her glory."

=== Act II ===
"We'll upraise the dead old days of Athens in her Glory!"

In a room in the Ducal palace, the new Grand Duke, Grand Duchess and court parade in classical costumes and sing a Grecian chorus. Left alone, Ludwig and Julia fail to agree on how her role is to be played. Caroline von Krakenfeldt arrives for her wedding and is startled to find that Rudolph has been replaced by Ludwig. But once she discovers that Ludwig has beaten Rudolph in a statutory duel, she points out that he must take on Rudolph's responsibilities – including his betrothal to her. So despite being already married to Julia, Ludwig goes off with Caroline to get married, and Julia makes a dramatic exit.

Ernest, though legally dead, is desperate for news and arrives to try to find out what is going on. He sees the wedding procession in the distance and assumes that Ludwig is marrying Lisa; but it cannot be so, for Lisa appears. She sees him and runs away in fright, since he is a "ghost". He then supposes that Ludwig must be marrying his Julia, but she too appears. Though affecting to be also frightened, she stays and tells him what Ludwig has done.

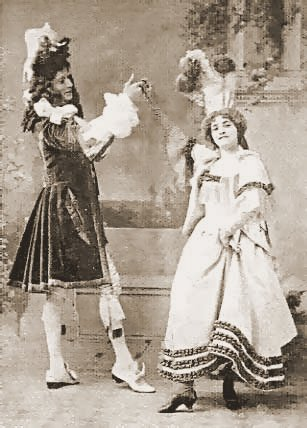
Owen and Fishe: "We're rigged out in magnificent array."

They leave, and the wedding party returns. Caroline is enjoying the rare pleasure of drinking "when somebody else pays the bill." Yet another unexpected visitor arrives: it is a herald, who announces that the Prince and Princess of Monte Carlo are on their way. Ludwig decides to give the Prince a theatrical welcome, and tells the company to hide.

The Prince of Monte Carlo arrives with his daughter the Princess and a retinue of supernumeraries – out-of-work actors hired from the Theatre Monaco to play the part of nobles. He has reversed his fortunes by inventing a game called roulette, which has allowed him to pay his debts, hire the supernumeraries, and take his daughter to Pfennig-Halbpfennig just in time to marry the Grand Duke before the engagement expires.

Ludwig and the court spring out at them, dancing a lively can-can. The Princess is shocked and upset when she discovers that Ludwig already has three Grand Duchesses. She points out, however, that her claim predates the others', and Ludwig is therefore obliged to marry her.

Ludwig and the Princess are about to go off to yet another wedding party, when Ernest, Rudolph and Dr Tannhäuser burst in. The Notary reveals that the Act regulating statutory duels specifically states that the ace shall count as lowest, so Ludwig did not win, was never Grand Duke, and cannot have revived the act. Within seconds, the Act expires, returning Ludwig and Ernest to the living. Three couples marry: Rudolph and the Princess; Ernest and Julia; and Ludwig and Lisa.

== Musical numbers ==
- Overture (Includes parts of "The good Grand Duke", "My Lord Grand Duke, farewell!", "With fury indescribable I burn", "Well, you're a pretty kind of fellow", "Strange the views some people hold")

Act I

- 1. "Won't it be a pretty wedding?" (Chorus)
- 1a. "Pretty Lisa, fair and tasty" (Lisa and Ludwig with Chorus)
- 2. "By the mystic regulation" (Ludwig with Chorus)
- 3. "Were I a king in very truth" (Ernest with Chorus)
- 4. "How would I play this part" (Julia and Ernest)
- 5. "My goodness me! What shall I do?", "Ten minutes since I met a chap" (Ludwig and Chorus)
- 6. "About a century since" (Notary)
- 7. "Strange the views some people hold" (Julia, Lisa, Ernest, Notary, and Ludwig)

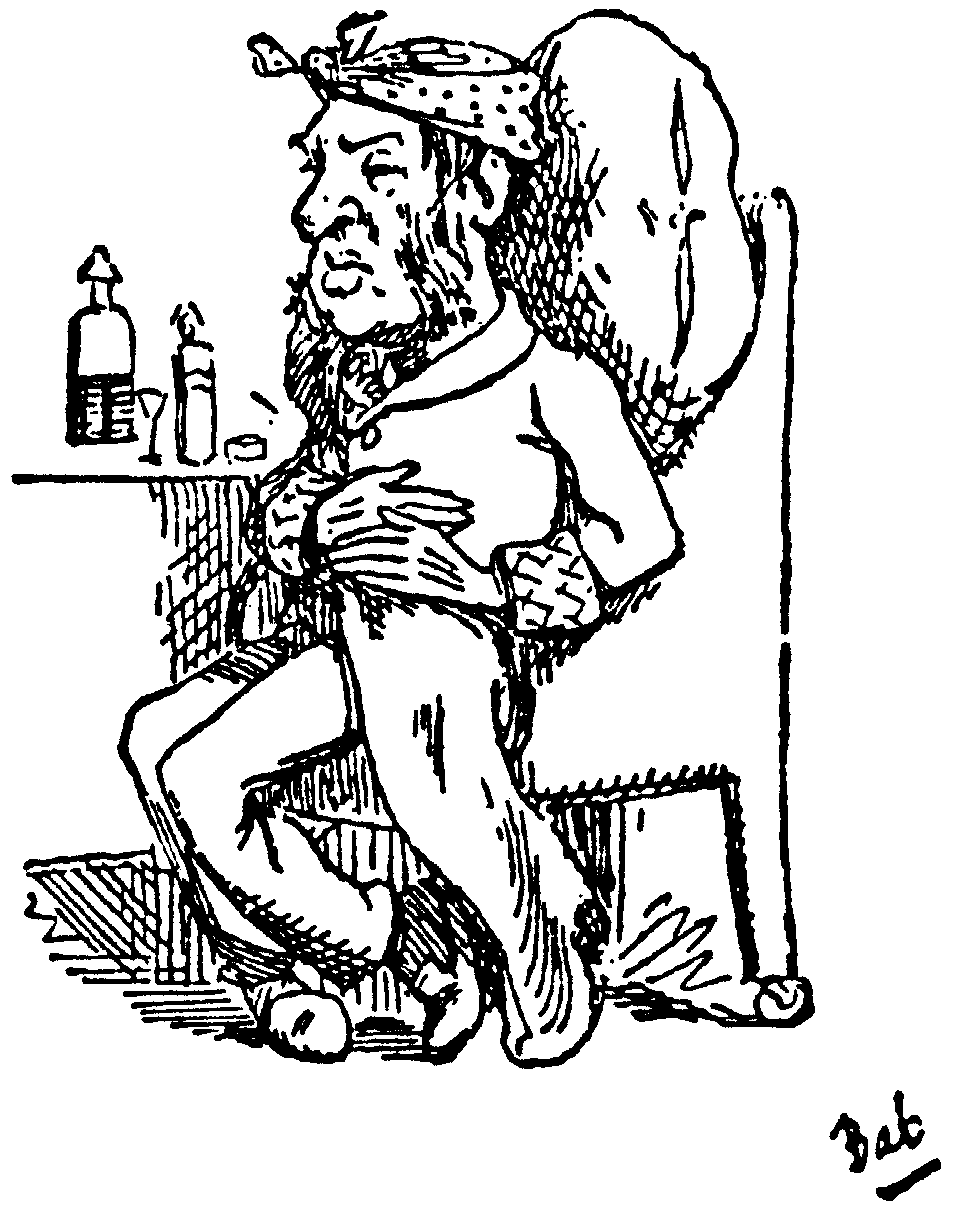
Bab drawing of Rudolph

- 8. "Now take a card and gaily sing" (Julia, Lisa, Ernest, Notary, and Ludwig)
- 9. "The good Grand Duke" (Chorus of Chamberlains)
- 9a. "A pattern to professors of monarchical autonomy" (Grand Duke)
- 10. "As o'er our penny roll we sing" (Baroness and Grand Duke)
- 11. "When you find you're a broken-down critter" (Grand Duke)
- 12. Finale, Act I
  - "Come hither, all you people" (Ensemble)
  - "Oh, a monarch who boasts intellectual graces" (Ludwig with Chorus)
  - "Ah, pity me, my comrades true" (Julia with Chorus)
  - "Oh, listen to me, dear" (Julia and Lisa with Chorus)
  - "The die is cast" (Lisa with Chorus)
  - "For this will be a jolly Court" (Ludwig and Chorus)

Act II

- 13. "As before you we defile" (Chorus)
- 14. "Your loyalty our Ducal heart-string touches" (Ludwig with Chorus)
- 14a. "At the outset I may mention" (Ludwig with Chorus)
- 15. "Yes, Ludwig and his Julia are mated" (Ludwig)
- 15a. "Take care of him – he's much too good to live" (Lisa)

Rosina Brandram as the Baroness

- 16. "Now Julia, come, consider it from" (Julia and Ludwig)
- 17. "Your Highness, there's a party at the door" (Chorus)
- 17a. "With fury indescribable I burn" (Baroness and Ludwig)
- 18. "Now away to the wedding we go" (Baroness and Chorus)
- 19. "So ends my dream", "Broken ev'ry promise plighted" (Julia)
- 20. "If the light of love's lingering ember" (Julia, Ernest, and Chorus)
- 21. "Come, bumpers – aye, ever-so-many" (Baroness with Chorus)
- 22. "Why, who is this approaching?" (Ludwig and Chorus)
- 23. "The Prince of Monte Carlo" (Herald and Chorus)
- 24. "His highness we know not" (Ludwig)
- 25. "We're rigged out in magnificent array" (Prince of Monte Carlo)
- 26. Dance
- 27. "Take my advice – when deep in debt" (Prince of Monte Carlo with Chorus)
- 28. "Hurrah! Now away to the wedding" (Ensemble)
- 28a. "Well, you're a pretty kind of fellow" (Grand Duke with Chorus)
- 29. "Happy couples, lightly treading" (Ensemble)

== Versions of the text ==
The published vocal score for The Grand Duke was available within days of opening night, and it included all of the music performed at the premiere. Shortly thereafter, there were a number of substantial cuts, which were reflected in the published libretto. It is uncertain whether Sullivan (who was travelling abroad) agreed with these cuts, but the published vocal score was never revised. The libretto and vocal score have thus remained in disagreement.

The cuts involving the music included:

- One verse of No. 10, "As o'er our penny roll we sing"
- Several passages in the Act I finale
- No. 21, "Come bumpers – aye, ever-so-many"
- No. 27, "Take my advice – when deep in debt"
- No. 28a, "Well you're a pretty kind of fellow"

There is no standard performing version of The Grand Duke. While most companies that have produced The Grand Duke agree that the first-night version is too long, there is no established tradition about which cuts to make, if any, and most productions have made cuts in the dialogue and often dropped verses and/or attempted some reorganization or rewriting.

The 1976 D'Oyly Carte recording observed the original cuts in Act I, but restored the three deleted numbers from Act II.

== Recordings ==
Until the D'Oyly Carte Opera Company recorded this opera in 1976, it was unfamiliar to most fans of Gilbert and Sullivan. While the 1976 recording has been well-received, the 1973 recording by UMGASS, though an amateur recording, including dialogue, is admired. The BBC had broadcast the opera with an excellent cast and including dialogue in 1966, but they have never released the recording. The 2012 professional production at the International Gilbert and Sullivan Festival was recorded on video.

Selected recordings

- 1966 BBC (radio broadcast with dialogue) – The John McCarthy Singers, The BBC Concert Orchestra; Conductor: Stanford Robinson
- 1973 University of Michigan Gilbert and Sullivan Society (with dialogue) – Conductor: Eric Stern
- 1976 D'Oyly Carte – Royal Philharmonic Orchestra; Conductor: Royston Nash
- 1989 BBC (radio broadcast with dialogue) – Ambrosian Singers, The BBC Concert Orchestra; Conductor: Barry Wordsworth
