= Courtice (disambiguation) =

Courtice may refer to:

- Courtice, Ontario, Canada
- Courtice (surname)
- Courtice Pounds, English actor
