= Courtice (surname) =

Courtice is a surname.

Notable people with this surname include:

- Ben Courtice, Australian politician
- Brian Courtice, Australian politician
- Frederick Colin Courtice, Australian scientist
- Frederick Courtice, Australian politician
- Julianne Courtice, English squash player
- Polly Courtice, British academic
- Rody Kenny Courtice, Canadian painter
- Sybil Courtice, Canadian missionary in Japan
- Thomas Courtice, American academic administrator
