= Florence Perry =

British singer and actress (1869–1949)

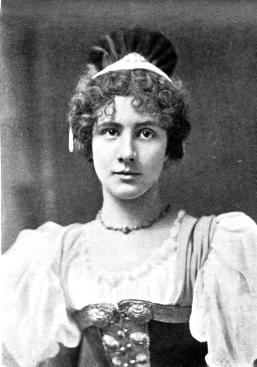
As Lisa in The Grand Duke, Act I

Florence Perry (13 July 1869 – 19 December 1949) was an English opera singer and actress best known for her performances with the D'Oyly Carte Opera Company.

== Biography ==
Florence Julia Perry was born in London in 1869. Her first professional appearance was in 1887 as Phyllis Tuppitt in Dorothy at the Prince of Wales's Theatre. She then toured in The Red Hussar and Doris. Shortly after her return to London, she was hired by the D'Oyly Carte Opera Company. Perry toured with the company from 1890 to 1893, appearing as Yum-Yum in The Mikado, Gianetta in The Gondoliers, Phyllis in Iolanthe, Winifred in The Vicar of Bray and Phoebe Fairleigh in Billee Taylor. Her elder sister, Beatrice (1865-1944), also performed with the company beginning in 1892.

Lisa, Act II

Perry then joined the London company in 1893 to create the role of Milly (later taking over the role of Bab) in Jane Annie at the Savoy Theatre. She continued performing at the Savoy for the next two years, creating the role of Princess Kalyba in Utopia Limited (1893–94), Bianca in Mirette (1894) and Dolly Grigg in The Chieftain (1894–95). Perry left the D'Oyly Carte organisation in 1895 to appear as Clementine in Baron Golosh at the Trafalgar Square Theatre. That same year, she returned to D'Oyly Carte on tour as Josephine in H.M.S. Pinafore, Yum-Yum in The Mikado and both Dolly Grigg and Rita in The Chieftain. Returning to London, she took over for Marie Tempest as Adele in An Artist's Model at the Lyric Theatre during the summer of 1895.

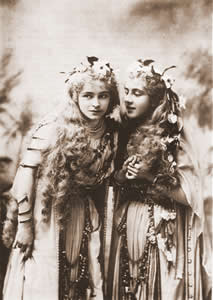
Perry with Emmie Owen in Utopia, Limited

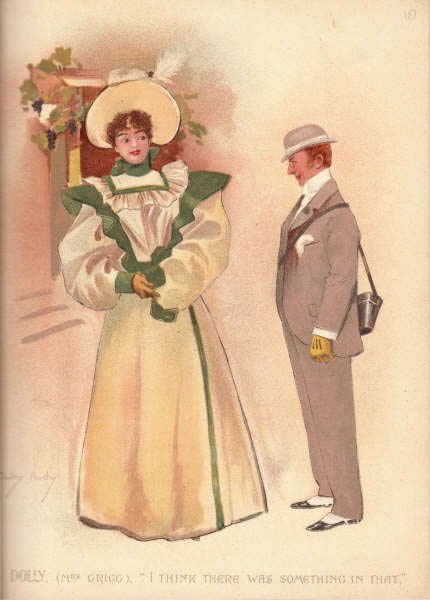
Perry and Passmore in The Chieftain

Perry returned to the D'Oyly Carte Opera Company in London in 1895 and stayed for the next three years. During this time, she appeared as Yum Yum in a revival of The Mikado, she created the role of Lisa in The Grand Duke (1896), also singing the role of Julia Jellicoe at some performances, and created the role of Princess Lucilla Chloris in His Majesty (1897). Later that year, she played Phoebe Meryll in the first revival of The Yeomen of the Guard and portrayed Wanda in The Grand Duchess of Gerolstein. (Note: The production was variously billed as The Grand Duchess of Gerolstein or just The Grand Duchess.)

In 1898, Perry appeared as The Plaintiff in the Nellie Farren Benefit performance of Trial by Jury. At the end of that year and into 1899, Perry traveled to Australia, playing Iolanthe in Sydney, among other roles on tour. She made her final London stage appearances in 1901 in The Thirty Thieves at Terry's Theatre and H.M.S. Irresponsible at the Globe Theatre.

Perry died in Durban, South Africa at the age of 80.

== Sources ==
- Joseph, Tony (2005). Emmie Owen and Florence Perry: Maidenly Perfection (D'Oyly Carte Personalities). London: Bunthorne Books. ISBN 0-9507992-7-0
- Ayre, Leslie (1972). The Gilbert & Sullivan Companion. London: W.H. Allen & Co Ltd. Introduction by Martyn Green.
- Florence Perry at Who Was Who in the D'Oyly Carte
