= The Chieftain =

Comic opera by Arthur Sullivan and F. C. Burnand

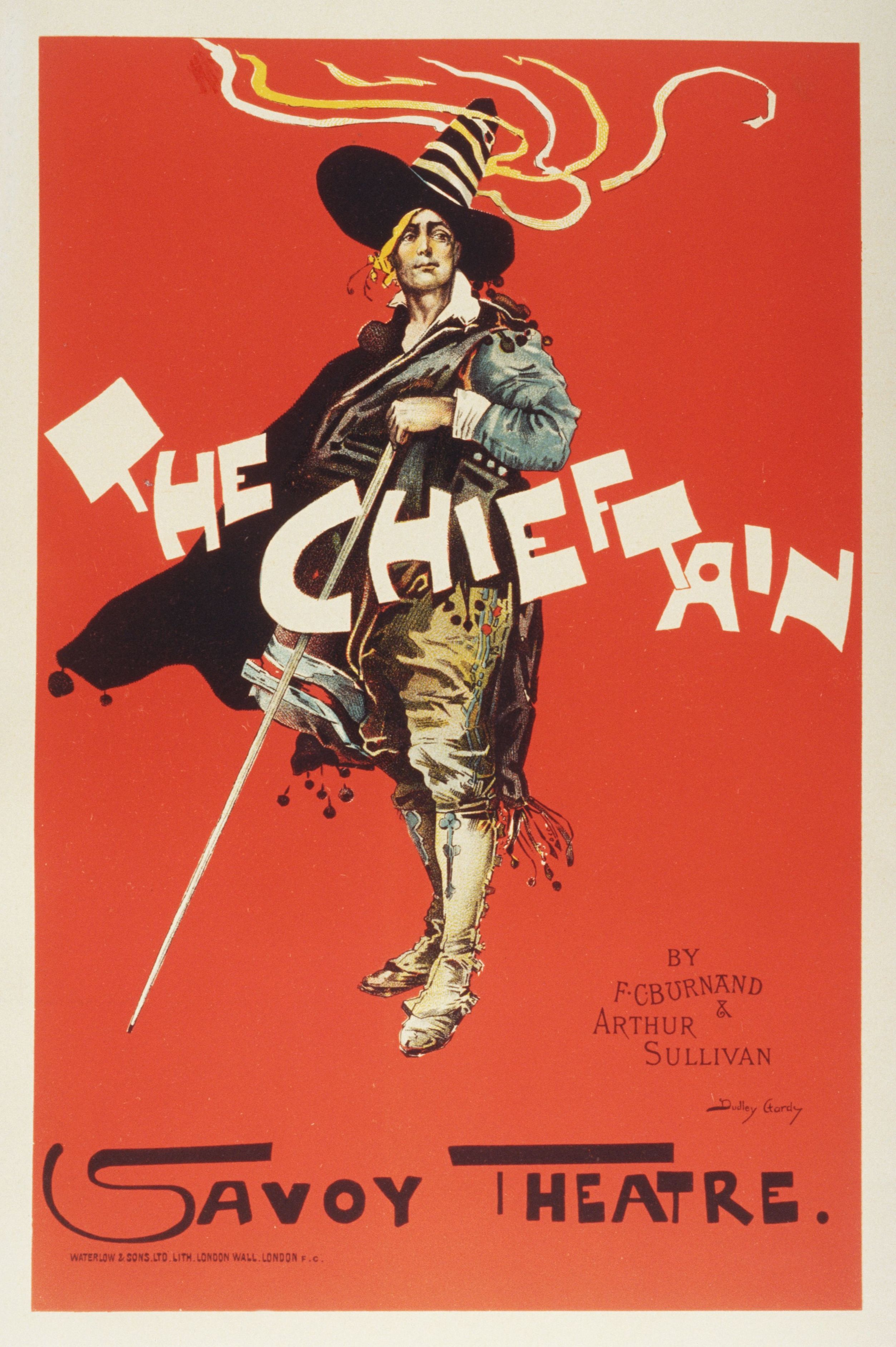
Poster showing Scott Fishe as Ferdinand de Roxas

The Chieftain is a two-act comic opera by Arthur Sullivan and F. C. Burnand based on their 1867 opera, The Contrabandista. It consists of substantially the same first act as the 1867 work with a completely new second act. It premiered at the Savoy Theatre on 12 December 1894, under the management of Richard D'Oyly Carte, for a run of 97 performances (by Sullivan's standards, a flop).

The opening cast included Florence St. John, Courtice Pounds, Walter Passmore, Richard Temple, Scott Russell, Florence Perry, Emmie Owen, R. Scott Fishe and Rosina Brandram.

== Background ==
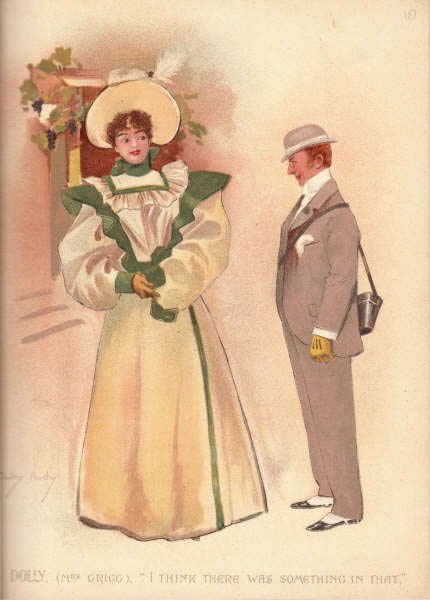
Perry and Passmore

In 1894, impresario Richard D'Oyly Carte needed a new piece for the Savoy Theatre. Gilbert and Sullivan's Utopia Limited had closed in June after a comparatively short (by G&S standards) nine-month run. André Messager's Mirette was an unsuccessful stop-gap, and Carte had to close the theatre in August. Desperate for a new work, he commissioned Sullivan and Burnand to revise The Contrabandista, which could be made ready faster than a new opera. Meanwhile, Mirette had been revised and re-opened in October for another two months, and although Mirette was playing strongly, once The Chieftain was ready in December, Carte closed Mirette, and The Chieftain was mounted.

As Savoy audiences expected an opera conforming to the style that Gilbert and Sullivan had established, the relatively short Contrabandista needed to be expanded. While the basic structure of the first act was retained, the dialogue was rewritten, and several songs were added to bring it up to the usual length. The earlier work's second act was entirely replaced with new material.

Although the piece was greeted warmly upon its opening on 12 December 1894, as were most Savoy operas, audiences did not sustain enthusiasm for the work, and there were numerous revisions, particularly in the first act. The team also rushed an abridged version of the still-popular Cox and Box into production as a curtain-raiser. W. S. Gilbert's His Excellency had opened in October and proved more popular than The Chieftain, which closed after just three months. The fault lay partly in Burnand's weak and pun-filled libretto, but also was a result of changing audience tastes, as, in addition to Gilbert's opera, musical comedy, such as those produced at the Gaiety Theatre by George Edwardes, was supplanting light opera on the London stage. After The Chieftain closed, the D'Oyly Carte Opera Company toured the London suburbs, while Carte leased the Savoy Theatre to the Carl Rosa Opera Company. The theatre was dark during the summer of 1895, reopening in November for a revival of The Mikado.

The Chieftain has not received a high-quality professional modern recording, unlike some of Sullivan's other non-G&S operas, although the piece has received a number of modern amateur performances. For example, it was presented in Bath, Somerset by the Bath Operatic and Dramatic Society in 1910; New York City by the Stage Society at the Presbyterian Church of the Covenant; Kingsbury, London, by the Kingsbury Amateur Operatic Society (1972); Retford, Nottinghamshire, by Generally G & S (1994); Buxton, Derbyshire, at the International Gilbert and Sullivan Festival, Buxton Opera House (1995); Kingston upon Hull, Yorkshire, by Dagger Lane Operatic Society (1995); Denmead, Hampshire, by Denmead Operatic Society (1999); and Newcastle upon Tyne by Newcastle University G & S Society (2000).

== Roles and original cast ==
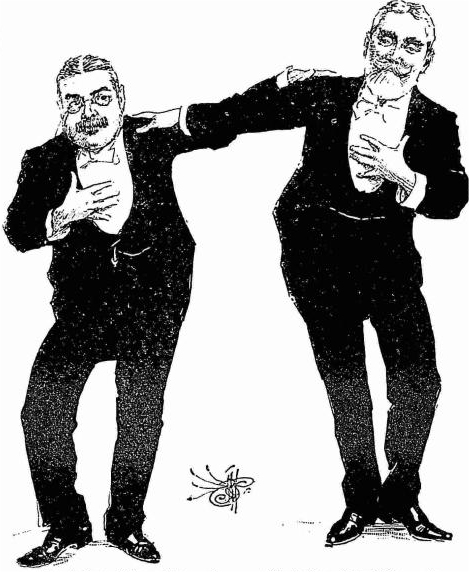
Sullivan and Burnand caricatured in Punch at the time of the premiere

Grigg installed as chieftain

- Sancho the Badger (1st Lieutenant of the Ladrones) (bass-baritone) – Richard Temple
- José the Buck (2nd Lieutenant of the Ladrones) (baritone) – M. R. Morand
- Inez de Roxas (Chieftainess of the Ladrones) (contralto) – Rosina Brandram
- Pedro Gomez (consulting lawyer, astrologer, and keeper of the archives of the Ladrones) (tenor) – Scott Russell
- Rita (an English lady engaged to Count Vasquez) (soprano) – Florence St. John
- Count Vasquez de Gonzago (A Spanish Noble) (tenor) – Courtice Pounds
- Mr. Peter Adolphus Grigg (a British tourist in search of the picturesque) (comic baritone) – Walter Passmore
- Dolly (Mrs. Grigg, Peter A. Grigg's wife) (soprano) – Florence Perry
- Ferdinand de Roxas (Chieftain of the Ladrones, disguised as Pietro Slivinski, a Polish courier) (baritone) – Scott Fishe

Minor characters:

- Blazzo (baritone) – Bowden Haswell
- Escatero – Powis Pinder
- Pedrillo (a goatherd) – Master Snelson
- Juanita (the dancing girl of the Ladrones) (soprano) – Emmie Owen
- Maraquita (soprano) – Edith Johnston
- Anna (a camerista) – Ada Newall
- Zitella – Beatrice Perry
- Nina – Ethel Wilson

== Synopsis ==
=== Act I ===
The action takes place in the mountains of Spain. Inez de Roxas is Queen of a gang of bandits, the Ladrones. Their Captain, Ferdinand de Roxas, has been missing for a year. The Law of the Ladrones holds that the first stranger who comes along will become their Chieftain and Inez's new husband.

The Ladrones have abducted Rita, an English lady. Inez orders a shepherd boy to deliver a ransom note, and they hold his elderly father hostage in the meantime. The old shepherd mentions that he has seen a stranger that day. The Ladrones wonder if this could be their new Chieftain. After the Ladrones withdraw, the shepherd reveals that he is Rita's lover, Vasquez, and they sing a jubilant duet.

Illustration from The Illustrated London News

Peter Adolphus Grigg, an English tourist and amateur photographer, enters in search of pretty scenery. Sancho and José inform him that he is the new Captain of the Ladrones. He tries to object, but they tell him he will be shot if he does not comply. The ransom money arrives. Vasquez and Rita are free to go, but they stay for the celebration of Grigg's marriage to Inez. Grigg again objects, as he is already married, but the Ladrones threaten him with death, and he reluctantly joins the festivities.

=== Act II ===
The action has transferred to the exterior of an inn where Rita and Vasquez are now staying, in the picturesque village of Dehesas, on the banks of the River Sil. The chorus sings in praise of the gold that they mine from the river. In the intervening time, Vasquez has ransomed Grigg, who is now free to meet up with his wife Dolly, who has come from England to find him. Mr. and Mrs. Grigg arrive, escorted by a Polish courtier, who is actually Ferdinand de Roxas, the real Chieftain, in disguise.

Mrs. Grigg is troubled by her husband's evasive explanations of his adventures in Spain. She is therefore unaware of his bigamy with Inez. Vasquez and Rita help him tell a fictional story of his heroic defeat of the Ladrones. Ferdinand, who also hears Grigg's story, now believes that his wife is dead.

The Ladrones enter, dressed as civilians. They are searching for Ferdinand, but run into the Griggs. Dolly befriends Inez, while Grigg is mortified that his wife will discover his duplicity. Realising Grigg's plight, the Ladrones agree to sell him a photograph of his wedding with Inez for £100, so that Dolly will never learn the truth. Ferdinand enters, and the Ladrones recognise him. He tries to escape, but when confronted with pistols, agrees happily to rejoin the band as their Chieftain once again.

== List of Numbers ==
Sancho and José menace Grigg

=== Act I ===
1. "Hush! Not a Step" (Sancho, José, and Chorus)
2. "Let others seek the peaceful plain" (Inez)
  - Alternate 2: "My parents were of great gentility" (Inez)
3. "Wanted, a Chieftain" (Inez, Sancho, José, Juanita)
4. "The Law of the Ladrones" (Pedro Gomez and Chorus)
5. "'Tis very hard to choose" (Inez, Sancho, and José)
6. Angelus (Blazzo, Chorus)
7. "Only the night wind sighs alone" (Rita)
  - Alternate 7: "A lady peers from a tower" (Rita)
8. "Hand of fate" (Rita, Inez, Vasquez, Sancho, José and Chorus)
9. "A guard by night" (Rita & Vasquez)
10. "From rock to rock" (Grigg)
11. "Hullo! What's that?" (Grigg, Sancho and José)
12. Finale Act I: "The Sacred Hat" (Ensemble)

=== Act II ===
1. "Wake, then, awake" (Vasquez)
2. "The river! the river" (Maraquita and Chorus)
3. "Two happy gods" (Rita and Chorus)
4. "Ah oui!, j'étais" (Rita and Vasquez)
5. "Bustle! bustle!" (Ferdinand and Chorus)
6. "'To Spain!' said my husband" (Dolly, with Rita, Vasquez, Grigg and Ferdinand)
7. "There are cases" (Rita, Vasquez, Grigg, Dolly and Ferdinand)
8. "La Criada" (Ferdinand)
9. "There's no one, I'm certain" (Juanita, Inez, Pedro, José and Sancho)
10. "What is the matter, Peter" (Dolly, Inez and Grigg)
11. "We quite understand" (Juanita, Inez, Pedro, Grigg, José & Sancho)
12. Finale Act II: "The Chieftain is found" (Ensemble)
