= Florence St. John =

British singer and actress

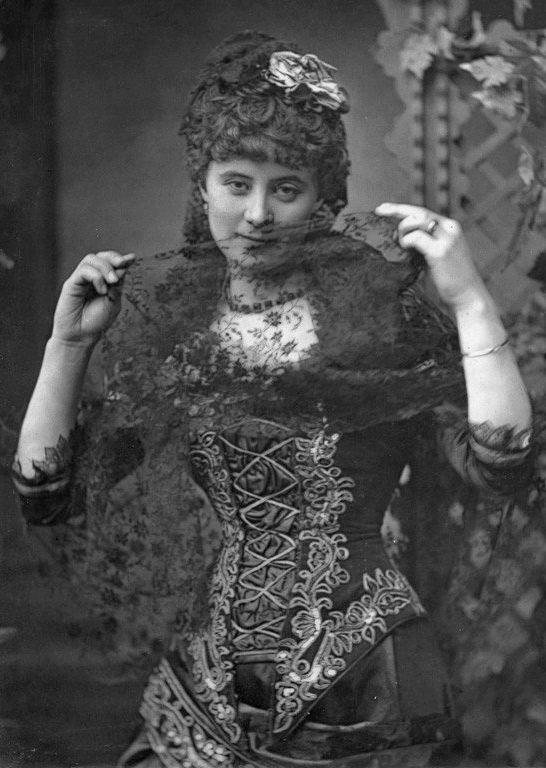
Florence St. John, c. 1880

Margaret Florence Greig (8 March 1855 – 30 January 1912), known by her stage name Florence St. John, was an English singer and actress of the late Victorian and Edwardian eras famous for her roles in operetta, musical burlesque, music hall, opera and, later, comic plays.

St. John began her career while still a teenager. By 1879, St. John was starring in new London productions, often creating roles, beginning with the title role in an English version of Madame Favart, which earned her critical praise. Despite occasional illnesses, she created the leading soprano roles in the light operas Olivette (1880), Barbe-bleue (1883), Nell Gwynne (1884) and Erminie (1885), among several others. In 1888, she joined the Gaiety Theatre company, playing Marguerite in the hit Victorian burlesque Faust up to Date, which toured America (1889–90), and then the British provinces. She then starred in Carmen up to Data.

In the early 1890s, St. John continued to pay at the Gaiety and also toured in the operetta Rip van Winkle. In 1892, she starred in In Town, which became a hit and ushered in the age of the Edwardian musical comedy. This was followed by the hit the burlesque Little Christopher Columbus. In 1894, she joined the D'Oyly Carte Opera Company in Mirette, created the role of Rita in The Chieftain and toured as Winifred in The Vicar of Bray. In the mid-1890s, she returned to concert singing, appearing regularly in the weekly Ballad Concerts at St James's Hall for many years. In 1897, she rejoined D'Oyly Carte, starring in the title role in the Savoy version of The Grand Duchess of Gerolstein.

In 1900, St. John made her last appearance in musical theatre as Dolores in Florodora. In 1902, she turned to "straight" theatre, starring over the next few years in several roles in London and on tour. Later, she toured the provincial variety theatres with her own company in a piece titled My Milliner's Bill, or by herself singing ballads. Her last theatrical appearance was in 1909 as Lizi in The Merry Peasant at the Strand Theatre.

== Life and career ==
St. John was born in Plymouth, England. Her father, Andrew Greig, had been stationed in Plymouth with the army, where he married St. John's mother, Susannah Williams, but he left the army before St. John was born. Her father ran a boarding house, and her mother a shop. She had five brothers and sisters.

St. John's public singing debut was at a charity concert in Plymouth when she was eight years old. When she was 12, her parents sent her to a private boarding school in Kensington to study music and voice with Madame Marie Karger.

=== Early career ===
At the age of 16, while home for the holidays, she was asked to substitute for the ailing vocalist of a touring diorama company. Soon, she began to tour with N. S. Hodges' diorama. Her rendition of Arthur Sullivan's "Meet Me Once Again" resulted in a permanent engagement. With Hodges, she performed in Jacques Offenbach's Rose of Auvergne and Breaking the Spell. At the age of seventeen, in 1872, she married the company's pianist and conductor, Alfred St. John.

After this, St. John sang in provincial music halls and as a ballad singer in concerts. Alfred became ill, and in 1875 they moved to London, where she sang at the Oxford Music Hall under the name "Florence Leslie", and he taught music when he was well enough. He died in September of that year. By the end of the year, St. John had joined Charles Durand's English Opera Company on tour, where she began to use her married name on stage. With Durand, she began to play roles such as Clorinda, one of the stepsisters in Gioachino Rossini's Cinderella; in Luigi Ricci's The Brewer of Preston (Il birraio di Preston); as Azucena in Il Trovatore; and as Lazarillo in Maritana.

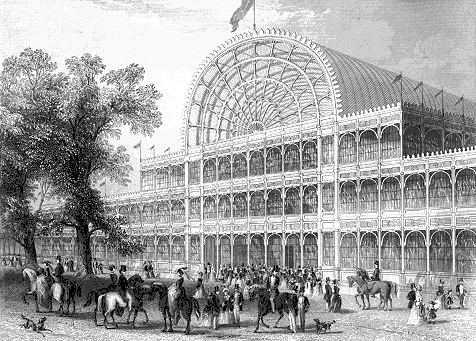
St. John appeared in ten operas at the original Crystal Palace

In February 1876, baritone Lithgow James joined the company. In September, St. John joined Walsham's English Opera Company on tour. She and James married in December (though touring with different companies). The couple reunited on tour with and Blanche Cole's opera company. St. John had a wide vocal range "as well as considerable histrionic versatility," and in these small touring companies, she often had to play contralto roles.

The couple soon joined the Rose Hersee Opera Company, which included Richard Temple. The Company gave a series of ten different operas at The Crystal Palace in August 1877, and St. John appeared in such roles as Cherubino in Mozart's The Marriage of Figaro, Urbano in Les Huguenots by Giacomo Meyerbeer, the title role in Maritana, Lelia in Satanella, the title role in La Cenerentola, Adalgisa in Norma, Lady Allcash in Fra Diavolo, and Azucena in Il Trovatore, among others. In December, she sang again at The Crystal Palace as Fidalma in performances of Cimarosa's The Secret Marriage, with an English adaptation by W. Grist, directed by Temple, who also played Geronimo.

=== Star of light opera ===
Alexander Henderson engaged St. John in 1878 to sing Germaine in the hit operetta, Les Cloches de Corneville by Robert Planquette with an English libretto by H. B. Farnie, in the provincial touring company (Alfred was cast opposite her as Henri, Marquis of Corneville). Towards the end of the record-setting London run, she took over the role in London, against her husband's wishes. The first London role that she created was the title role in Farnie's English-language version of Offenbach's Madame Favart, at the Strand Theatre in 1879. She received high praise from the critics and her performance in the hit production made her a star. London's Daily News wrote that she was "a young actress of very pleasing appearance, who acts with remarkable vivacity and grace, possesses a mezzo-soprano voice of really fine quality, and sings in a style that indicates a thoroughly sound training...." The piece went on to run for over 500 performances, and St. John stayed until near the end of the run, when her doctor advised her to take a break before the next piece, which was already scheduled.

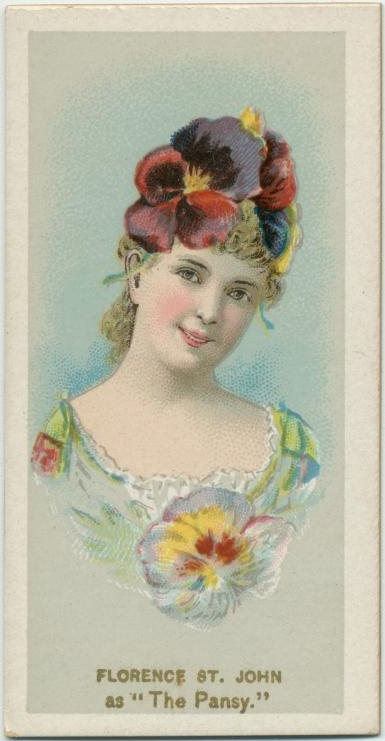
St. John on a cigarette card, 1889

Her husband had reluctantly moved to London with her in 1879. The couple stayed with her parents, who had moved to London, but he had trouble getting work there. Later in the year he joined the D'Oyly Carte Opera Company on tour. In Madame Favart, St. John played opposite flamboyant French actor Claude Marius Duplany, and the co-stars fell in love, finally moving in together. James obtained a divorce from St. John in 1881, and Duplany's wife divorced him. Meanwhile, the couple starred together again in Farnie's next operetta, Olivette, composed by Edmond Audran. This opened in September 1880 and lasted for another astonishing run of 467 performances. After this, Duplany became the manager of the Avenue Theatre, and he and St. John starred there first in a revival of Madame Favart, and then in Manteaux Noirs (1882), Offenbach's posthumous Belle Lurette, and Barbe-bleue (both in 1883). After these, they toured together in Belle Lurette.

In 1884, Henderson produced Farnie's Nell Gwynne, with St. John in the title role, then Farnie's The Grand Mogul, composed by Audran, with St. John as Djemma, and a revival of Barbe-bleue. In 1885, St. John starred in The Lady of the Locket at the Empire Theatre but fell ill after three months. At the end of the year, she created the title role in Erminie, but she was pregnant and soon had to leave the cast, and the role was taken over by Marie Tempest. St. John's father died that December. She and Duplany had not yet married and now took care of that detail on Christmas Day, 1885. Their son, Claud Reginald Duplany, was born on 30 March 1886. As soon as St. John was ready to go back to work, Erminie was revived with the original cast and then toured.

In the autumn of 1886, St. John moved to the Prince of Wales's Theatre and played Jaquette in Andre Messager's La Béarnaise, followed by another revival of Madame Favart at the Avenue Theatre in 1887. St. John fell ill again and left the cast. During this illness, she met Arthur Cohen, who would become her fourth husband ten years later. She went to Monte Carlo at the end of the year to recuperate further, and Cohen followed. Untrue rumours of a relationship between St. John and Cohen were circulated, and her husband grew jealous. More marital problems arose, the couple quarrelled frequently, and St. John left her husband in late 1888.

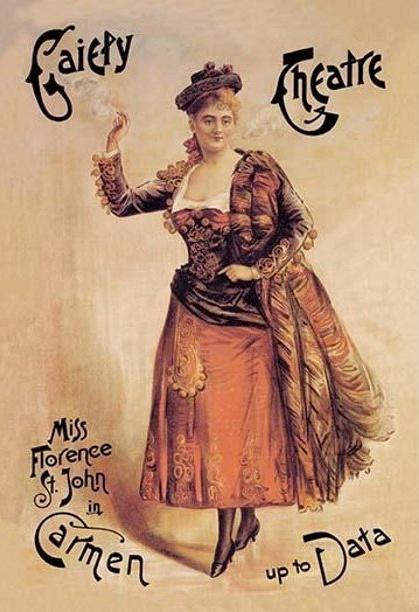
In Carmen up to Data, 1890

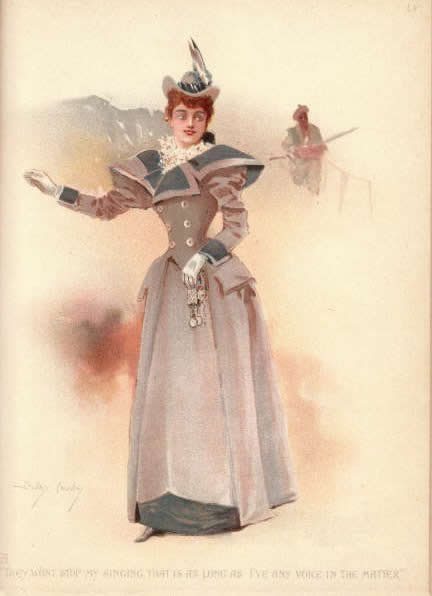
As Rita in The Chieftain

In October 1888 she joined the Gaiety Theatre company, under the management of George Edwardes, playing Marguerite in Faust up to Date, which was brought to America (1889–90) and later toured the British provinces in the same work. St. John and the tour were warmly received in the US. According to The Licensed Victuallers' Mail, an American fan sang humorously about how St. John pronounced her last name, as follows:

Oh, tell me why should Miss St. John
Pronounce her name as Sin Jin?
It would be better, two to one
I’ve heard a hundred people say,
To substitute the hard g for j,
For then she would be singin’.

She returned to England to play the title role in the burlesque Carmen up to Data in the provincial tryout in Liverpool in September 1890 and then at the Gaiety, followed in 1891 by a provincial tour of the piece. One reviewer marvelled that St. John, coming from humble roots, "draws a salary in London of £3,500 a year, whilst in America her services command £100 a week. The Prime Minister of England [sic] is not so well paid."

Now almost 37 years old, St. John took over the teen-age title role in Miss Decima at Toole's Theatre in January 1892, then went on tour with Planquette's Rip van Winkle, returning after the summer to the Gaiety Theatre for a revival of Faust up to Date. In October, she and Arthur Roberts starred in In Town, which became a hit and ushered in the age of the Edwardian musical comedy. In 1893, she moved to the Lyric Theatre in the burlesque Little Christopher Columbus.

=== Later years ===
Now approaching the age of 40, St. John was engaged by the D'Oyly Carte Opera Company in October 1894 as a replacement in the title role of Mirette by Messager at the Savoy Theatre, giving a boost to the ailing production. The Era's reviewer wrote, "Mirette has gained in favour, and the other artists, stimulated by Miss St. John's presence, act and sing with greater animation."

After this, she created the role of Rita in Arthur Sullivan and F. C. Burnand's The Chieftain at the Savoy (1894–95), earning good notices. She then toured briefly in 1895 with a D'Oyly Carte company as Mirette and as Winifred in The Vicar of Bray. On 9 June 1896, St. John played the plaintiff in a benefit performance of Trial by Jury for Kate Vaughan at the Gaiety Theatre, with Rutland Barrington as the judge and many other D'Oyly Carte singers, and the benefit also featured Marie Tempest, Letty Lind and other famous performers.

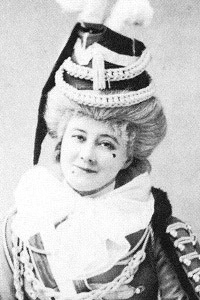
as the Grand Duchess

For the next two years, St. John did little theatre work, except for brief runs in the Bric-a-brac Will and The Little Genius. Instead, she returned to singing, appearing regularly in the weekly Ballad Concerts at St James's Hall. In January 1896, her separated husband, who had been ill, died on the journey home from a South Africa tour. In February 1897, St. John married Arthur Cohen, her fourth husband. The marriage was not happy, but the couple stayed together until 1901. Meanwhile, in September 1897, St. John returned to the theatre in an Edwardes production of La Périchole at the Garrick Theatre.

In 1897–98, she rejoined the D'Oyly Carte at the Savoy, playing the title role in The Grand Duchess of Gerolstein. (Note: The production was variously billed as The Grand Duchess of Gerolstein or just The Grand Duchess.) Though she received generally good notices, St. John bridled at the famously strict direction at the Savoy and later complained that she had not been allowed to "do any business of my own." The Times review supports her judgment: "The English stage has no artist so well fitted as Miss Florence St. John to do full justice to Offenbach... her artistic singing would more than carry this off if she could recover the abandon of some of her former efforts. ...she looks the part to perfection, but she seems so afraid of overdoing the suggestion and roguery which are essential that she makes the impersonation seem sadly tame. It is as if she were overwhelmed with the atmosphere of the theatre in which she finds herself, or were affected more than all the rest by the prudish spirit in which the work has been approached."

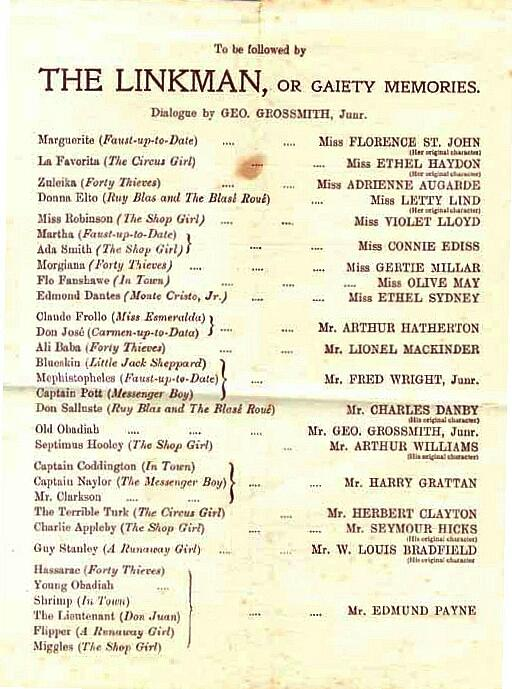
Part of the programme for the Old Gaiety's farewell performance

St. John made her last appearance in musical comedy as Dolores in Florodora (1900–01), taking over the role from Evie Greene. She made only one known recording, a single Berliner disc of "He Loves Me; He Loves Me Not," from Florodora, which was reproduced on the Pearl LP set "The Art of the Savoyard: Volume II" (GEMM 282/3). She did, however, continue singing in the St. James's Hall Ballad Concerts and in numerous benefits and charity concerts.

In early 1902, now 47 years old, St. John turned to "straight" theatre, starting with a tour in the title role of English Nell, which had been played in London by Marie Tempest. In the autumn, she played Mrs. Brandram in Mrs. Willoughby's Kiss at the Avenue Theatre. In 1903, she played Mrs. Greaves in Billy's Little Love Affair at the Criterion Theatre, followed in December of that year by the farce, Madame Sherry at the Apollo Theatre. She also appeared at the star-studded final performance at the "Old" Gaiety Theatre on 4 July 1903, singing Marguerite in an excerpt from Faust up to Date and led the singing of Auld Lang Syne. Other famous performers included Henry Irving, Gertie Millar, Seymour Hicks, George Grossmith, Jr., Rutland Barrington, Arthur Williams, Letty Lind, Harry Grattan, Edmund Payne and Richard Temple.

With her career now on the decline and her income much less, St. John toured the provincial variety theatres, for the next several years, with her own company in a piece entitled My Milliner's Bill, or by herself singing ballads. She did appear at the Royalty Theatre in London in 1905 in a short run of The Diplomatists. Her mother died in 1904. St. John's last theatrical appearance was in late 1909 as Lizi in The Merry Peasant at the Strand Theatre.

Known to her many friends as "Jack", St. John died in London a little more than two years later at the age of 56 and was cremated at Golders Green at a quiet ceremony attended by her son Reginald and the composer Leslie Stuart, among others.

== Sources ==
- Sharp, Keith Drummond. "Florence St. John" in The Gaiety, Winter 2006.
