= Emmie Owen =

British actress and singer (1871–1905)

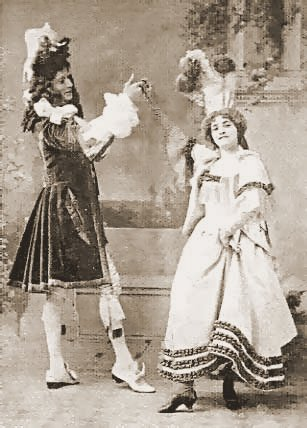
with Scott Fishe in The Grand Duke

Emily Mary Owen (28 November 1871 – 18 October 1905) was an English opera singer and actress, known for her performances in soprano roles of the Savoy operas with the D'Oyly Carte Opera Company. She is best remembered for originating the roles of Princess Nekaya in Utopia, Limited, and the Princess of Monte Carlo in The Grand Duke, the last two Gilbert and Sullivan operas. Beginning as a child actress, Owen performed for two decades in comic opera and pantomime, mostly in England, before falling ill and dying at the age of 33.

== Early life and career ==
Owen was born in Bristol to Henry Owen, stage carpenter at Prince's Theatre, and Hester née Morgan, his wife. There Owen made her theatrical debut at the age of eleven. By 1885 she was playing speaking roles in Proof and appeared as Little Eva in Uncle Tom's Cabin, and in 1890, in the Prince's pantomime of Aladdin, she was So-Shi.

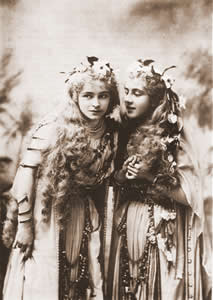
Owen with Florence Perry in Utopia, Limited

In 1891, Owen joined the D'Oyly Carte Opera Company on tour, playing the small role of Cheetah in The Nautch Girl. She left the company to appear in a Christmas pantomime in Birmingham, returning to tour with the company in 1892 as Cynthia in The Vicar of Bray and as Polly in the companion piece, Captain Billy. Late in the tour, she played Nance in Arthur Sullivan's Haddon Hall.

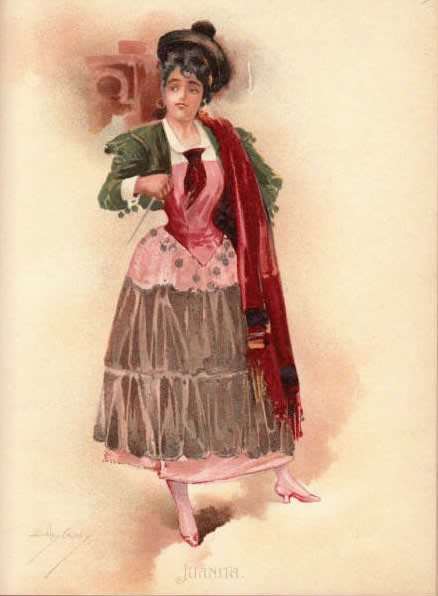
Owen as Juanita in The Chieftain

In 1893, she continued to play Nance with the main D'Oyly Carte company at the Savoy Theatre. There she then originated the roles of Rose in Jane Annie (1893, and on tour), Princess Nekaya in Gilbert and Sullivan's Utopia, Limited (1893–94), Zerbinette in Mirette (1894), and Juanita in Arthur Sullivan's The Chieftain (1894–95, and on tour). She also stepped into the title role in Mirette in July and August 1894. In 1895, she toured as Juanita and then in Gilbert and Sullivan's Patience, first as Lady Saphir and then as the title character. When The Gondoliers replaced The Chieftain later in the tour, she added the role of Gianetta to her repertoire.

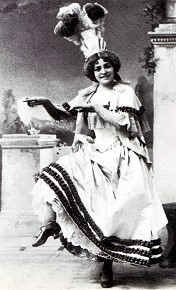
Owen as the Princess of Monte Carlo in The Grand Duke

Next, back at the Savoy, Owen played Peep-Bo in a revival of The Mikado (1895–96). There, in 1896, she created the role of the Princess of Monte Carlo in The Grand Duke, Gilbert and Sullivan's last opera. At the same time, she appeared as Maria in the curtain raiser After All! She was Peep-Bo again in 1896, and she originated the female role, "She", in the companion piece Weather or No. In August she briefly played in the leading role of Yum-Yum in The Mikado.

Owen left the D'Oyly Carte Opera Company later in the year to appear as Suzanne in the musical comedy Monte Carlo, but she re-joined the D'Oyly Carte to tour South Africa from December 1896 to June 1897, appearing in the leading Gilbert and Sullivan soprano roles, including the title role in Patience, Phyllis in Iolanthe, Yum-Yum, Elsie Maynard in The Yeomen of the Guard and Gianetta, as well as her old role of Nekaya. She was next back at the Savoy in July and August 1897 to play Elsie during the first London revival of Yeomen. Owen left the company again to play Anita in a revival of La Périchole at the Garrick Theatre in late 1897.

== Later career and early death ==
At the Savoy in 1898, Owen sang Gianetta, originated the role of Jacqueline in Sullivan's The Beauty Stone, and played Constance in a revival of Gilbert and Sullivan's The Sorcerer. In 1899, she created the role of Lazuli in The Lucky Star and sang Cousin Hebe in H.M.S. Pinafore. She then created the role of Honey-of-Life in Sullivan's last completed opera, The Rose of Persia (1899–1900), before leaving the D'Oyly Carte for the final time.

She returned to playing in pantomime, appearing in the "principal girl" role in Cinderella at the Shakespeare Theatre, Clapham Junction (1900–01). After this, she toured Australia with the George Musgrove company, in The Scarlet Feather (an English version of Charles Lecocq's La petite mademoiselle) and Dandini in a pantomime of Cinderella. She then went to New Zealand performing with the showman P. F. Dix. There she ran out of money and experienced illnesses, from which she never recovered. Her English friends raised funds to help her return home; afterwards she made only rare appearances.

She died in Crundale, Kent, of Cirrhosis of the liver on 18 October 1905 at age 33.

== Sources ==
- Ayre, Leslie (1972). The Gilbert & Sullivan Companion. London: W.H. Allen & Co Ltd.
- Gänzl, Kurt (2021). Gilbert and Sullivan: The Players and the Plays. State University of New York Press. ISBN 978-1-4384-8545-4
