= R. Scott Fishe =

British opera singer and actor

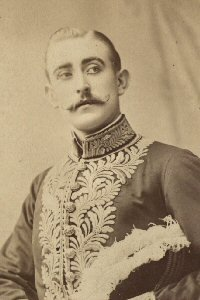
R. Scott Fishe as Mr Goldbury in Utopia Limited in 1893

Robert Scott Fishe (12 February 1871 – 31 August 1898) was an English operatic baritone and actor best remembered for creating roles in the 1890s with the D’Oyly Carte Opera Company.

As a boy, Fishe was a chorister with the Chapel Royal. After beginning his professional stage career, he was hired in 1891 by Richard D'Oyly Carte for the chorus of Arthur Sullivan's grand opera Ivanhoe. He soon toured in South America with other D'Oyly Carte artistes, performing in comic operas and surviving a shipwreck off the coast of Chile.

In 1892, Fishe played leading roles with the D'Oyly Carte Opera Company and in other West End companies, but from spring 1893, he performed exclusively with D'Oyly Carte. Although he had begun to suffer from tuberculosis, he created several roles, most notably in Gilbert and Sullivan's last two operas: Mr. Goldbury in Utopia, Limited (1893) and the Prince of Monte Carlo in The Grand Duke (1896). He played the title role in several revivals of The Mikado. In 1896, he travelled to South Africa for a D'Oyly Carte tour. There, he fell ill again, but he was able to return to the stage briefly at the end of 1897, after which run his health deteriorated.

After several attempts to recuperate, Fishe gave up all hope of recovery, and he committed suicide at the age of 27.

== Early career ==
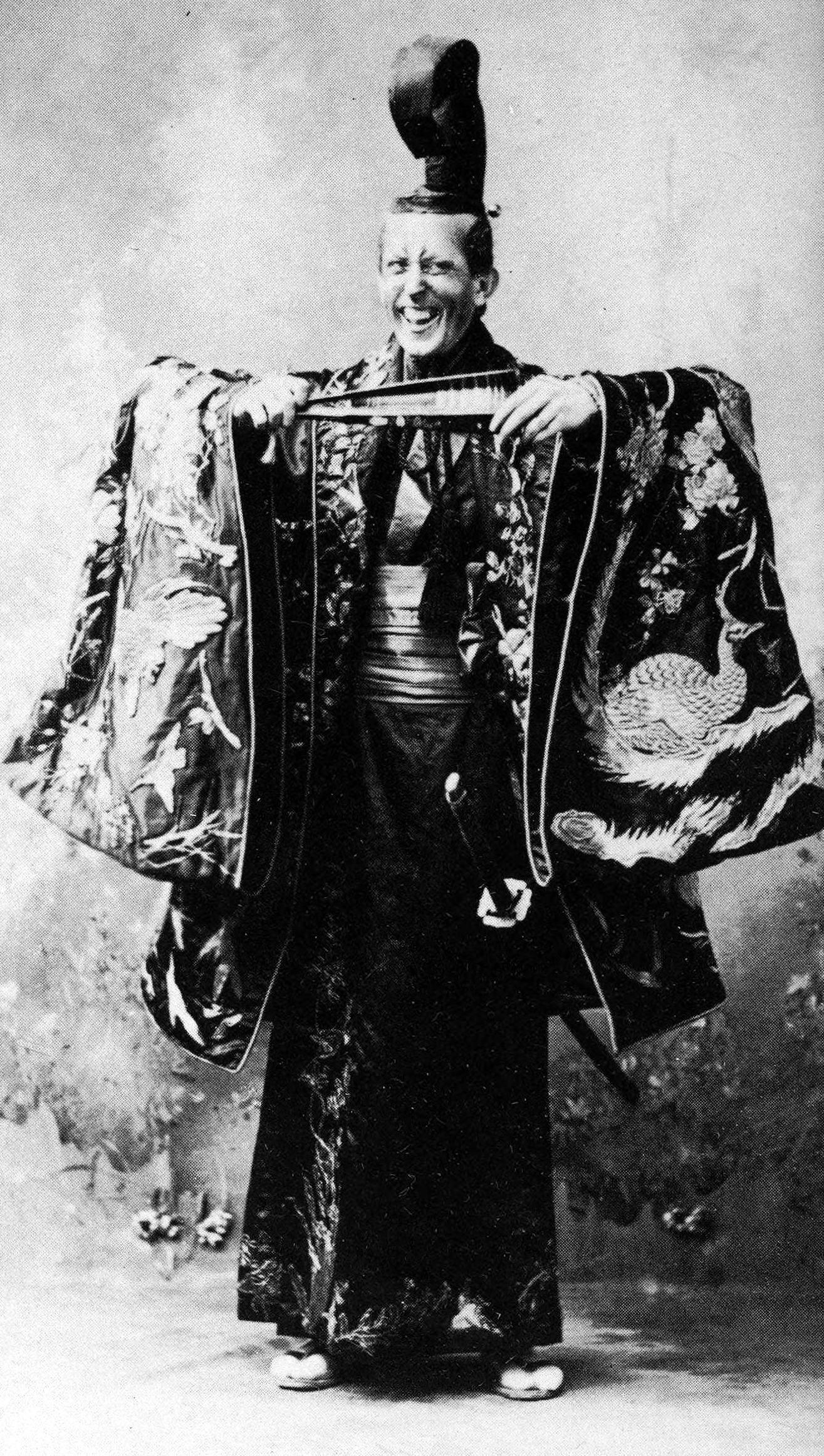
As the Mikado of Japan, 1895

"Bob" Fishe was born in Stanhope Street in St Pancras, London, to Jane (née Scott) and Robert Fishe, an ironmonger. Although his mother went by the name "Fishe", she did not marry his father until 1874. On their banns entry, Robert Fishe is listed as a widower, and his bride as a spinster; they were living at the same address.

He began to perform as a boy in church choirs and at concerts and was selected as a chorister with the Chapel Royal He made his professional stage debut singing nautical songs in a variety show at Hengler's Circus in London. He sang in the chorus at the Globe Theatre in Luscombe Searelle's The Black Rover and was then hired in 1891 by Richard D'Oyly Carte for the chorus of Arthur Sullivan's grand opera Ivanhoe at the Royal English Opera House.

Later in 1891, still only twenty years old, Fishe and other D'Oyly Carte regulars, including Leonora Braham, went to South America with the Edwin Cleary Opera Company. There they performed in Buenos Aires, Montevideo, Valparaíso, Lima, Rio de Janeiro, and other cities. Fishe had roles in The Pirates of Penzance (the Pirate King), Patience (Major Murgatroyd), The Mikado (title role), The Sorcerer (Sir Marmaduke), Dorothy (Harry Sherwood), Pepita (Bombardos) and Erminie, among other works. The company was shipwrecked off the coast of Chile in the middle of the tour, losing most of their possessions, but there were no deaths. Some of the company, including Fishe, made their way on horseback across the Andes to Argentina. They returned to England in March 1892.

Fishe was then engaged by the D'Oyly Carte Opera Company, immediately performing the role of Thomas Merton in The Vicar of Bray at the Savoy Theatre. At the end of the run, he left the Savoy to star in Ma mie Rosette at the Globe Theatre and then at the Prince of Wales Theatre from November 1892 to February 1893. Fishe began to suffer from tuberculosis, perhaps as early as on the South America tour, and the disease was to advance over the ensuing years. After Ma mie Rosette, he travelled to Switzerland to convalesce.

== Savoy Theatre ==
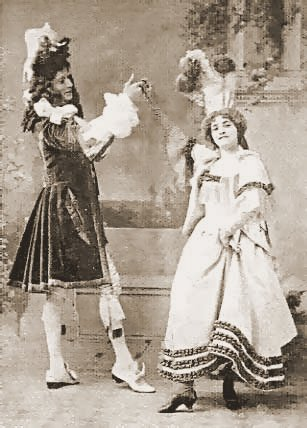
With Emmie Owen in The Grand Duke, 1896

In the spring of 1893, Fishe returned to the Savoy Theatre to create roles in several more Savoy Operas. These began with the role of Jack in the short-lived Jane Annie, which opened in May 1893. In his 1908 memoir, Rutland Barrington tells the following story about Fishe:

...when Ford and I returned from golf, we found [Fishe and Charles Kenningham] fast asleep on sofas. ...it shortly became time to go to the theatre, and though we eventually aroused Kenningham, nothing we could do would waken Scott Fishe. He could not be left – time was flying – so between us we half carried, half pushed him round the corner, got him dressed, and stood by him till his cue came to go on the stage, and literally shoved him on. He went through the dialogue of his scene, sang his song without making the slightest mistake, came off the stage and – woke up! not having a notion what he had done."

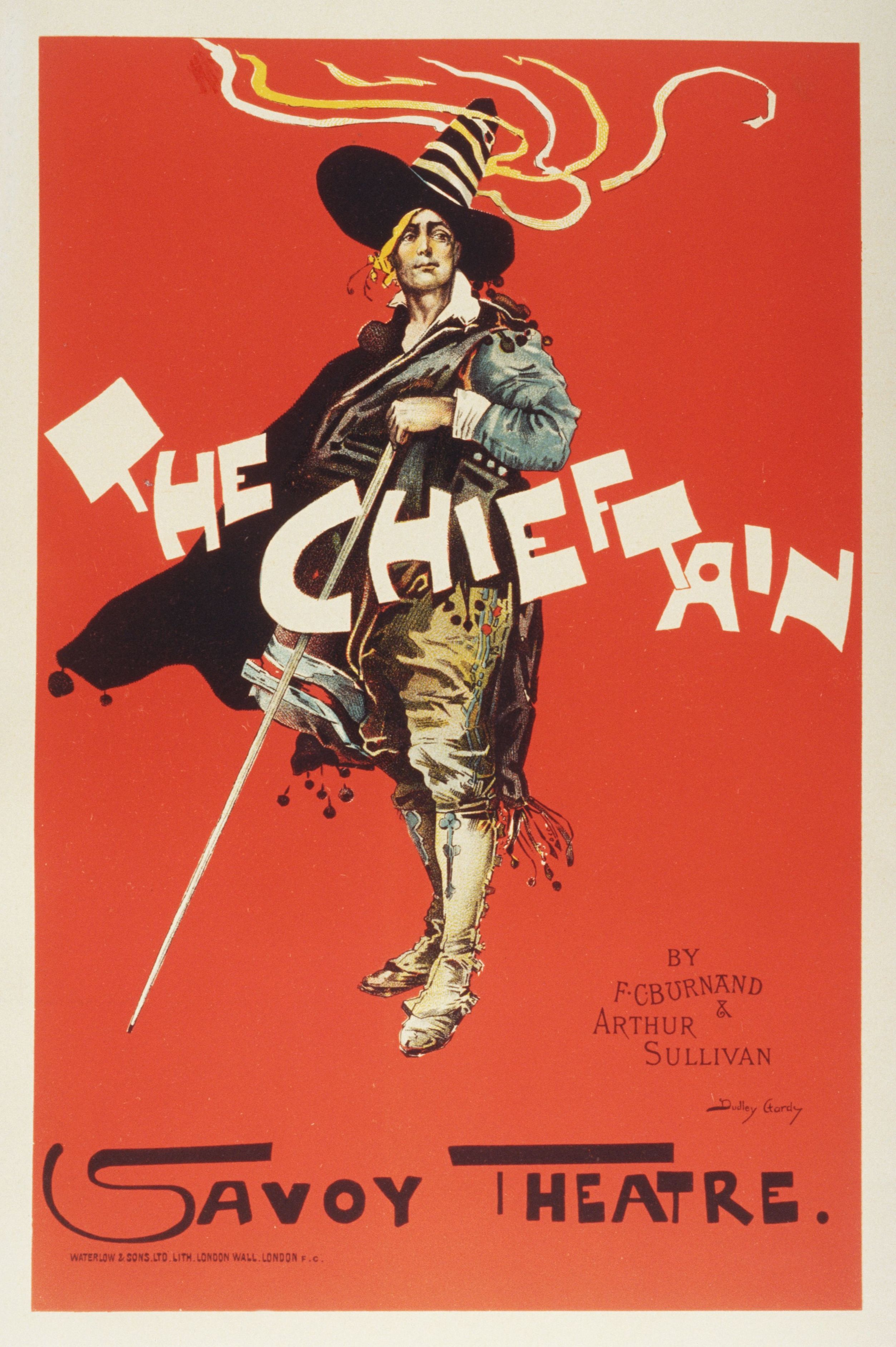
Poster showing Fishe as Ferdinand de Roxas in The Chieftain (1894)

In October 1893, Fishe created the part of Mr. Goldbury in Gilbert and Sullivan's Utopia, Limited, and in July 1894 he created the role of Gerard de Montigny in Mirette, resuming this role when the revised version opened in October. In December 1894 he created the role of Ferdinand de Roxas in Burnand and Sullivan's The Chieftain.

In April 1895 Fishe joined a D'Oyly Carte touring company, appearing in his old roles of Tommy Merton, Mr. Goldbury, Gerard de Montigny, and Ferdinand de Roxas. When Princess Ida was added to the repertoire, Fishe appeared as Florian. Fishe returned to the Savoy Theatre in November to play the title role in the revival of The Mikado. He continued to play at the Savoy, creating the role of the Prince of Monte Carlo in Gilbert and Sullivan's last opera, The Grand Duke, in 1896 and then played the title role in another revival of The Mikado.

== Later life ==
In December 1896, Fishe travelled to South Africa together with Emmie Owen and George Thorne in a D'Oyly Carte tour. There he appeared as the Mikado of Japan in The Mikado and Giuseppe in The Gondoliers. However, he fell ill again during the tour and returned to England in early 1897. After another convalescence, in December 1897 he returned to the Savoy Theatre, playing Colonel Macrobrunner in The Grand Duchess of Gerolstein, after which run his health deteriorated.

Fishe never fully recovered from tuberculosis, and Richard D'Oyly Carte paid for first-class passage for him to go to Jamaica to recuperate. Believing he had no hope of recovery, however, Fishe returned to England and was sent to Margate in the hope that the bracing sea air at that resort would help him. When that also failed, he went to London where, suffering intense pain and having obtained a revolver, he committed suicide on 31 August 1898, aged 27 years.
