= Walter Passmore =

British actor and singer

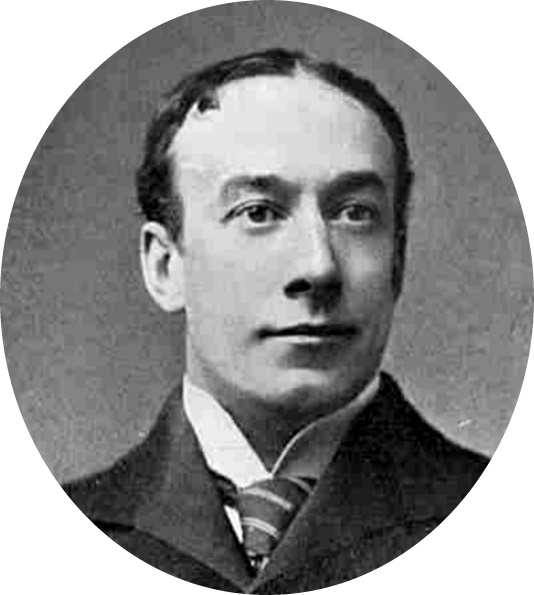
Passmore in 1901

Walter Henry Passmore (10 May 1867 – 29 August 1946) was an English singer and actor best known as the first successor to George Grossmith in the comic baritone roles in Gilbert and Sullivan operas with the D'Oyly Carte Opera Company.

Passmore began performing professionally at the age of fourteen in the pantomime Cinderella. He was apprenticed to a piano maker and then worked as a pianist before returning to acting, making his London debut in 1890. In 1893 he joined the D'Oyly Carte Opera Company, soon becoming the company's principal comedian. He created roles in the original productions of the last two Gilbert and Sullivan operas and in many other Savoy Operas. He played the patter roles in several Gilbert and Sullivan revivals, and he toured for the company.

In 1903 Passmore left the company and began a career in musical comedies, plays and pantomimes in the West End and on tour that lasted for thirty years. His West End appearances included roles in such productions as The Earl and the Girl (1903), The Talk of the Town (1905). He often appeared on stage with his second wife, Agnes Fraser.

== Life and career ==
=== Early career ===
Passmore was born in London, the son of Louisa Emma née Bullock (1829–1902) and Alfred Passmore (1825–1889), a coffee house keeper. He became a choirboy at All Saints Church in Notting Hill. On Christmas morning 1881 he sang in Messiah, and the following day he made his first professional stage appearance at the age of fourteen at Sunderland as a page in the pantomime Cinderella. He then served as an apprentice to the piano makers Cramer & Co, but at the end of the apprenticeship he took a job as a pianist with travelling concert parties and performed in farcical comedies.

In 1889 in Wigan, Lancashire, he married Kathleen Naomi P. Nanton (1869–1901) and with her had four children: Naomi Kathleen Eugenie Passmore (1889–1889); Josephine Doris Passmore (born 1892); Mirette Louisa Passmore (1894–1970) (named after the opera Mirette he was appearing in at the time of her birth); and Walter Frederick Passmore (1896–1974). The following year, Passmore made his London debut in a revival of Dion Boucicault's drama The Flying Scud at the Standard Theatre, Bishopsgate.

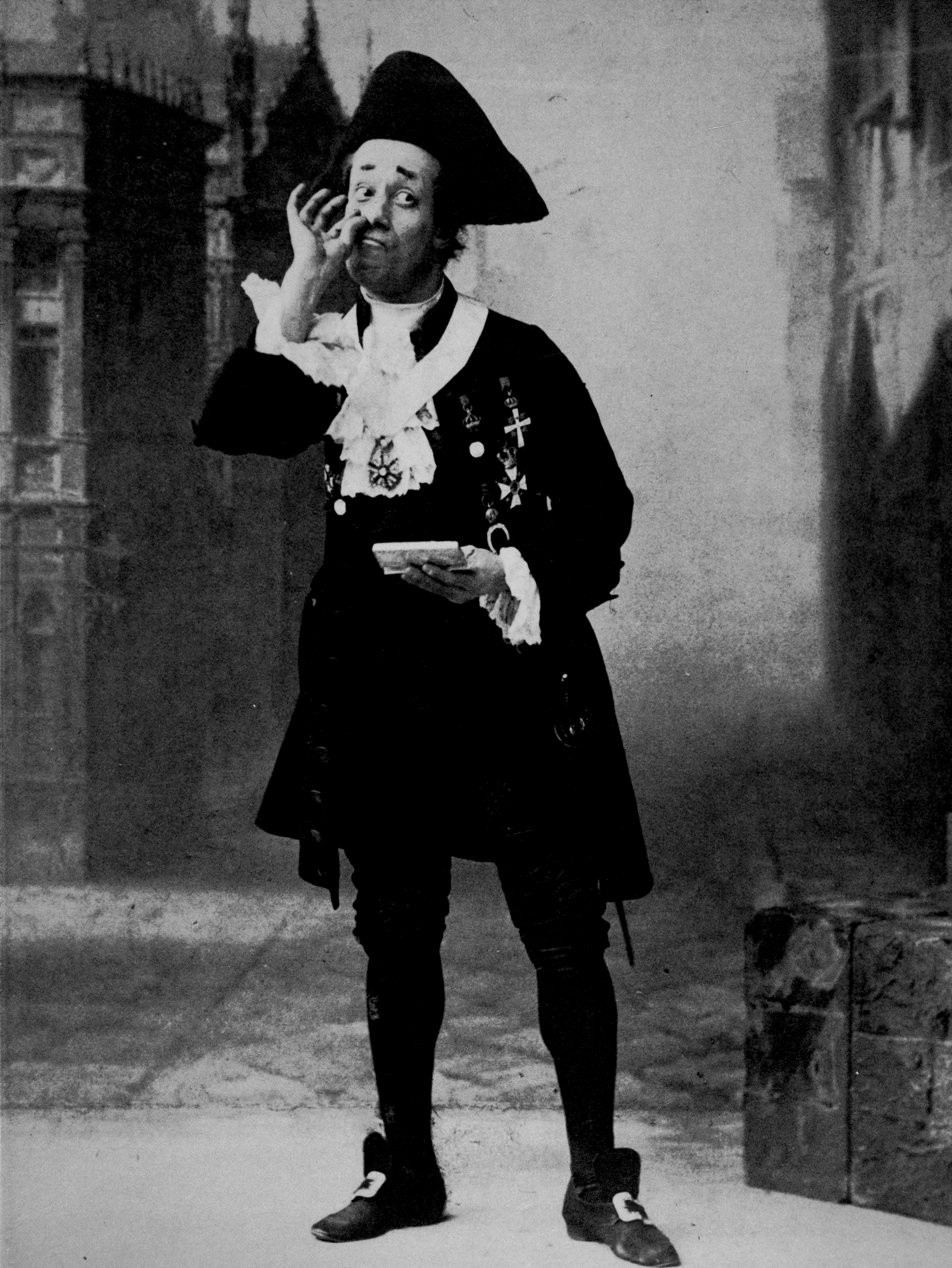
Rudolph, The Grand Duke

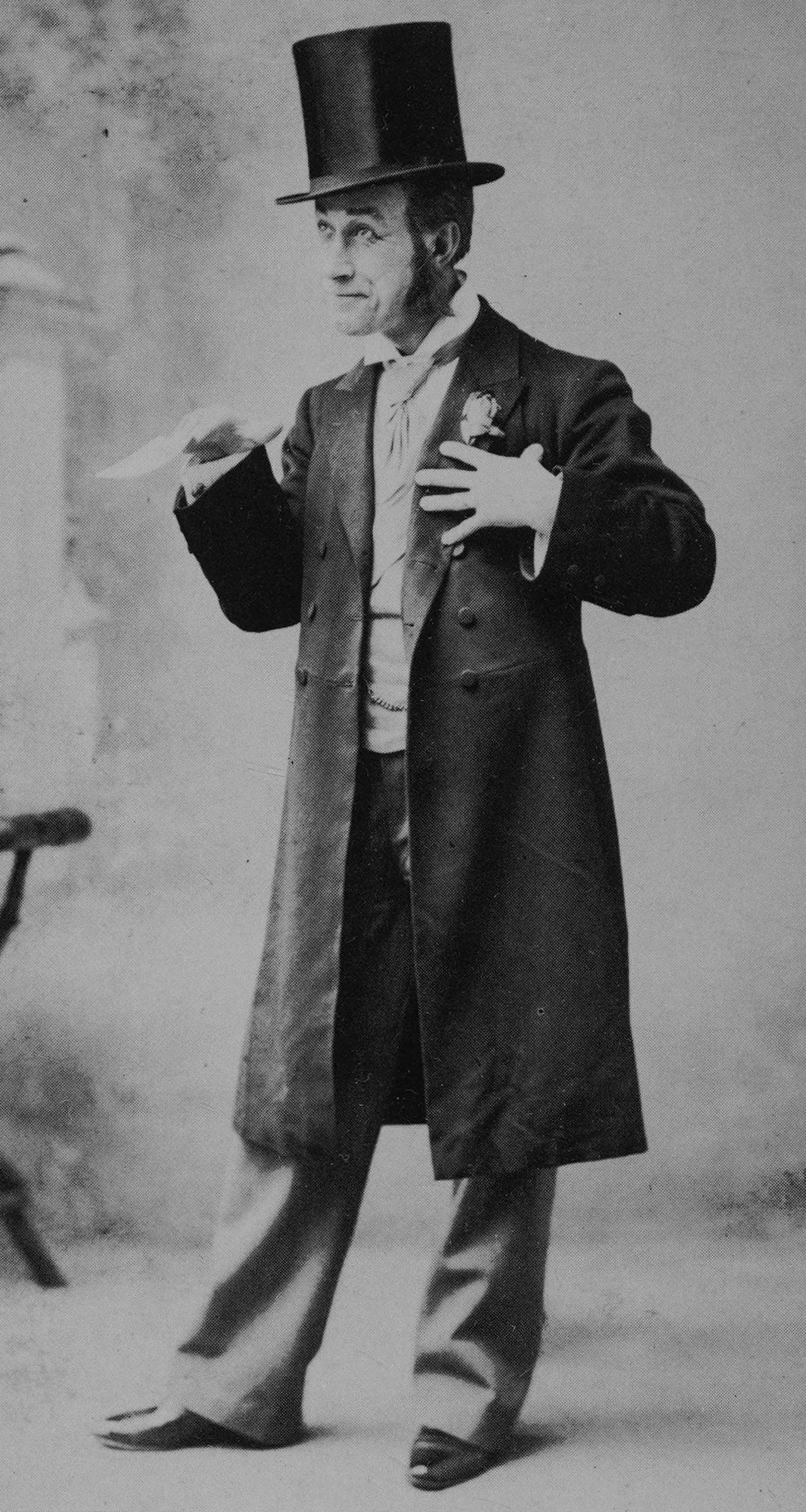
Mr Wells, The Sorcerer

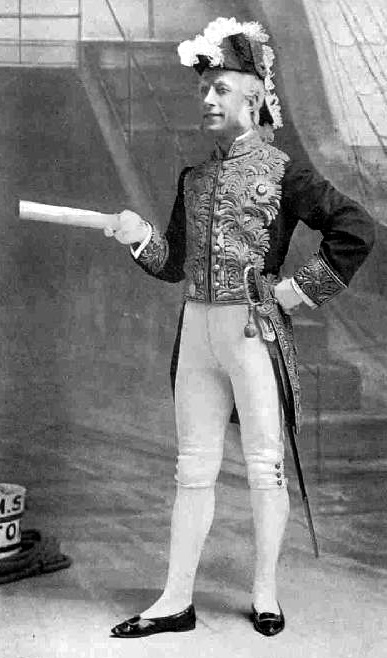
Sir Joseph, H.M.S. Pinafore

Passmore joined the D'Oyly Carte Opera Company in 1893, where he created the small part of Greg in the unsuccessful Jane Annie at the Savoy Theatre (libretto by J. M. Barrie and Arthur Conan Doyle; music by Ernest Ford). Next, in Gilbert and Sullivan's Utopia, Limited (1893–94), he created the role of Tarara, the public exploder. He then created his first starring role, Bobinet in André Messager's Mirette (1894). He also performed in Utopia in the role of King Paramount on tour that year. He next created the role of Peter Adolphus Grigg in Sullivan and Burnand's The Chieftain (1894–1895). After this, he toured as Bobinet and Grigg.

=== Principal comedian of the D'Oyly Carte ===
Passmore returned to the Savoy in 1895, where he continued as D'Oyly Carte's principal comedian, playing Ko-Ko in revivals of The Mikado (1895–97). In between these revivals, he created the role of Grand Duke Rudolph in Gilbert and Sullivan's last opera, The Grand Duke (1896). In 1897, in His Majesty, he created the part of Boodel, earning good notices. He next played Jack Point in the first revival of The Yeomen of the Guard (1897). This was followed by the roles of General Boom in The Grand Duchess of Gerolstein (1897–98) (Note: The production was variously billed as The Grand Duchess of Gerolstein or just The Grand Duchess.) and the Grand Inquisitor, Don Alhambra, in revivals of The Gondoliers (1898). In 1898, he created the role of The Devil in the original production of The Beauty Stone.

Passmore continued to play at the Savoy as the Usher in Trial by Jury, John Wellington Wells in The Sorcerer (1898) and King Ouf I in The Lucky Star (1899). After seeing Passmore's performance in The Lucky Star, Sullivan noted in his diary, "The fun of the whole piece lies in Passmore. Take him out and nothing's left. He worked splendidly and carried the opera through. I wish though he could drop his 'cockney' accent and manners at times." Passmore next played Sir Joseph in a revival of H.M.S. Pinafore (1899). While rehearsing the role, Passmore suggested to W. S. Gilbert that he might walk around with his nose in the air "as though raising it above an unpleasant smell". Gilbert quipped, "Unpleasant smell? Well, you're the best judge of that, Passmore."

Passmore then created the role of Hassan in The Rose of Persia (1899–1900) and played the Sergeant of Police in the second revival of The Pirates of Penzance (1900) and in the first revival of Patience (1900–01), he was Bunthorne. He created the role of Professor Bunn in The Emerald Isle (1901), was Ping-Pong in The Willow Pattern (1901), and played the Lord Chancellor in the first revival of Iolanthe (1901–02). He created the role of Walter Wilkins in Merrie England (1902, and on tour) and played Puck in A Princess of Kensington (1903, and on tour). Passmore's theatrical performances were famous for their visual humour. George Baker remembered Passmore's Sergeant of Police as being "obstreperously funny".

=== Later years ===
Passmore stayed in London when the D'Oyly Carte company went on tour in 1903. There he began a career in musical comedies, plays and pantomimes in London's West End and on tour that lasted for thirty years. He first appeared at the Adelphi Theatre, where he played Jim Cheese in the hit musical The Earl and the Girl (1903) and the Emperor in Little Hans Andersen (1903), then to the Lyric Theatre as Jerry Snipe in The Talk of the Town (1905) and as Private Charlie Taylor in The Blue Moon (1905). His pantomimes at the Theatre Royal, Drury Lane included Cinderella (1905, as the Baroness), Sinbad (1906, in the title role), and Babes in the Wood (1907, as Reggie, the boy babe). At the Apollo Theatre, he appeared in The Dairymaids (1906) and The Three Kisses (1907), and at the Queen's Theatre he played Baptiste Boubillon in The Belle of Brittany (1908).

In 1909–10 Passmore toured as John Smith/Simplicitatis in The Arcadians and as Wilkins in Merrie England. In 1910 he played Frank, the prison governor, in Johann Strauss's Die Fledermaus in Thomas Beecham's first opera season at His Majesty's Theatre. The production – one of the few works in the season not to lose money – "depended for its popularity in part upon Walter Passmore, the celebrated D'Oyly Carte droll". (Note: Sullivan's Ivanhoe was also staged by Beecham during this season, but Passmore was not in the cast.) He appeared as Nikola in Baron Trenck at the Strand Theatre (1911). At the Woolwich Hippodrome in July 1914 he played Private Adam Blinder in The Soldiers' Mess, of which he was also the composer.

Passmore continued to appear in the West End and on tour throughout the 1920s. In 1922 he toured in Titbits, which was billed as "a somewhat different revue", of which he was co-author. During the First World War Passmore appeared in a variety of comedy parts in the West End and on tour, and at the Gaiety Theatre in April 1924 he played Jericho Mardyke in Our Nell. Later in that year he went on tour playing Cahoot in Madame Pompadour. A late Gilbert and Sullivan performance was in Trial by Jury at a benefit matinée for Courtice Pounds in 1927, when Passmore was joined by stars including Leslie Henson and Derek Oldham. During 1928, with his daughter Nancie in the cast, he appeared on tour as Albert Chuff in Princess Charming. A reviewer commented, "Few comedians have a more sonorous voice, few dance so well, and few have a larger experience".

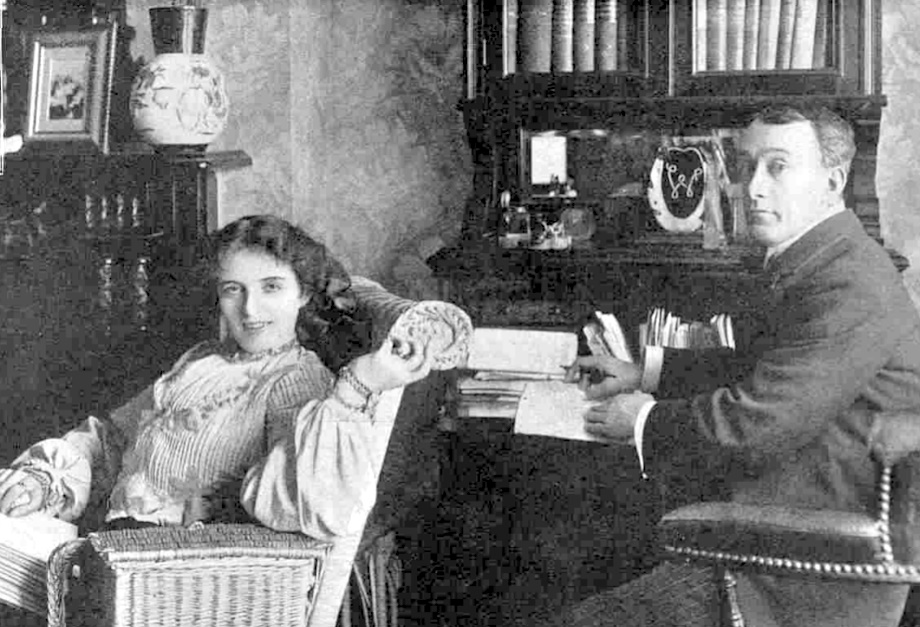
Agnes Fraser and Passmore in 1903

In 1929 Passmore toured as Count Theodore Volny in "The Damask Rose" a Ruritanian romance with music adapted from Chopin. The production was brought into the West End in March 1930, when one reviewer wrote "Walter Passmore and Amy Augarde played into each others' hands with an easy competence that was a delight to watch". This was his last West End production, and he retired in 1933.

Following the death of his first wife in 1901 Passmore married another D'Oyly Carte artist, Agnes Fraser, in 1902 at Wandsworth, London, who frequently appeared with him on stage. They had four children: Henry Fraser Passmore (1905–1987, a general manager of Hammer films 1935–37); John Fraser Passmore (1908–1973); Nancie A. Passmore (1910–1990), who married the tenor Joseph Hislop; and Isobel Mary Fraser Passmore (1913–1992). In 1939 he was living with his wife and unmarried stockbroker son John in a modest retirement at Heath Mews at The Mount in Hampstead, London.

Passmore died at Golders Green, London, at the age of 79.

== Gallery ==
Sergeant
The Pirates of Penzance

Bunthorne
Patience

Ko-Ko
The Mikado

General Boom
The Grand Duchess

Hassan
The Rose of Persia

Walter Wilkins
Merrie England

Bertrand Bouillon
The Belle of Brittany

== Recordings ==
My name is John Wellington Wells
Passmore sings "My name is John Wellington Wells" from The Sorcerer, 1900

As some day it may happen
Passmore sings "As some day it may happen" from The Mikado, 1908

On a tree by a river
Passmore sings "On a tree by a river" from The Mikado, 1912

Between 1900 and 1913, Passmore recorded over a dozen individual songs from the Gilbert and Sullivan operas for Odeon. Many of these have been re-issued by Pearl on LP and CD ("The Art of the Savoyard", Pearl GEMM CD 9991).

In a historic 1908 recording of The Mikado for Odeon that was reissued by Pearl on LP (GEMM 198), Passmore sang the role of Ko-Ko. This recording is nearly complete and is a rare opportunity to hear an artist who recorded a role that he played under Gilbert's and Sullivan's personal direction.

== Sources ==
- Ayre, Leslie (1972). The Gilbert & Sullivan Companion. London: W. H. Allen. OCLC 614438640.
- Reid, Charles (1961). Thomas Beecham – An Independent Biography. London: Victor Gollancz. OCLC 1016272508.
- Rollins, Cyril; R. John Witts (1962). The D'Oyly Carte Opera Company in Gilbert and Sullivan Operas: A Record of Productions, 1875–1961. London: Michael Joseph. OCLC 504581419.
- Parker, John, ed. (1936). Who's Who in the Theatre (eighth ed.). London: Sir Isaac Pitman and Sons. OCLC 10013159.
