= Frederick Courtice =

Australian politician

The Hon Frederick Courtice
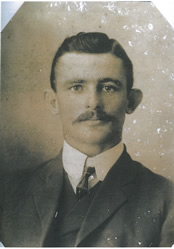

Member of the Queensland Legislative Council
- In office 12 October 1917 – 23 March 1922

Personal details
- Born: Frederick Courtice; 2 April 1883 Mt Perry, Queensland, Australia
- Died: 18 February 1956 (aged 72) Bundaberg, Queensland, Australia
- Resting place: Bundaberg General Cemetery
- Party: Labor
- Spouse: Mary Lillian Pegg (m.1908 d.1968)
- Relations: Ben Courtice (brother), Frederick Colin Courtice (son)

Frederick Courtice (2 April 1883 – 18 February 1956) was a member of the Queensland Legislative Council.

== Early life ==
Courtice was born at Mount Perry, Queensland, to parents Francis Courtice, labourer, and Elizabeth (née Hamilton) and educated at Bundaberg State School.

== Political career ==
When the Labour Party starting forming governments in Queensland, it found much of its legislation being blocked by a hostile Council, where members had been appointed for life by successive conservative governments. After a failed referendum in May 1917, Premier Ryan tried a new tactic, and later that year advised the Governor, Sir Hamilton John Goold-Adams, to appoint thirteen new members whose allegiance lay with Labour to the council.

Courtice was one of the thirteen new members, and went on to serve for four and a half years until the council was abolished in March 1922. He also served on the Barolin and Woongarra Shire Council, and was its chairman for 23 years.

Courtice was also a member of many boards including: The Bundaberg Harbour and Abattoir Boards, The Burnett Bridge Board, Trustee of the Bundaberg cemetery, Committee member of the Barolin State School, Member of the Millaquin Suppliers, The Cane Prices Board, Canegrowers' Executive, Cane Pests and Diseases Board

== Personal life ==
On 22 April 1908, Courtice married Mary Lillian Pegg and together had six children. One son, Frederick Colin Courtice, was awarded a Rhodes Scholarship and went on to become a medical researcher and Fellow of the Australian Academy of Science.

Courtice's younger brother, Ben Courtice, also representing the Labor Party, was a long-serving member of the Australian Senate. His nephew, Brian Courtice, later served in the Australian House of Representatives.

Courtice died in February 1956 and was buried in Bundaberg General Cemetery.
