= Mirette (opera) =

Opera composed by André Messager

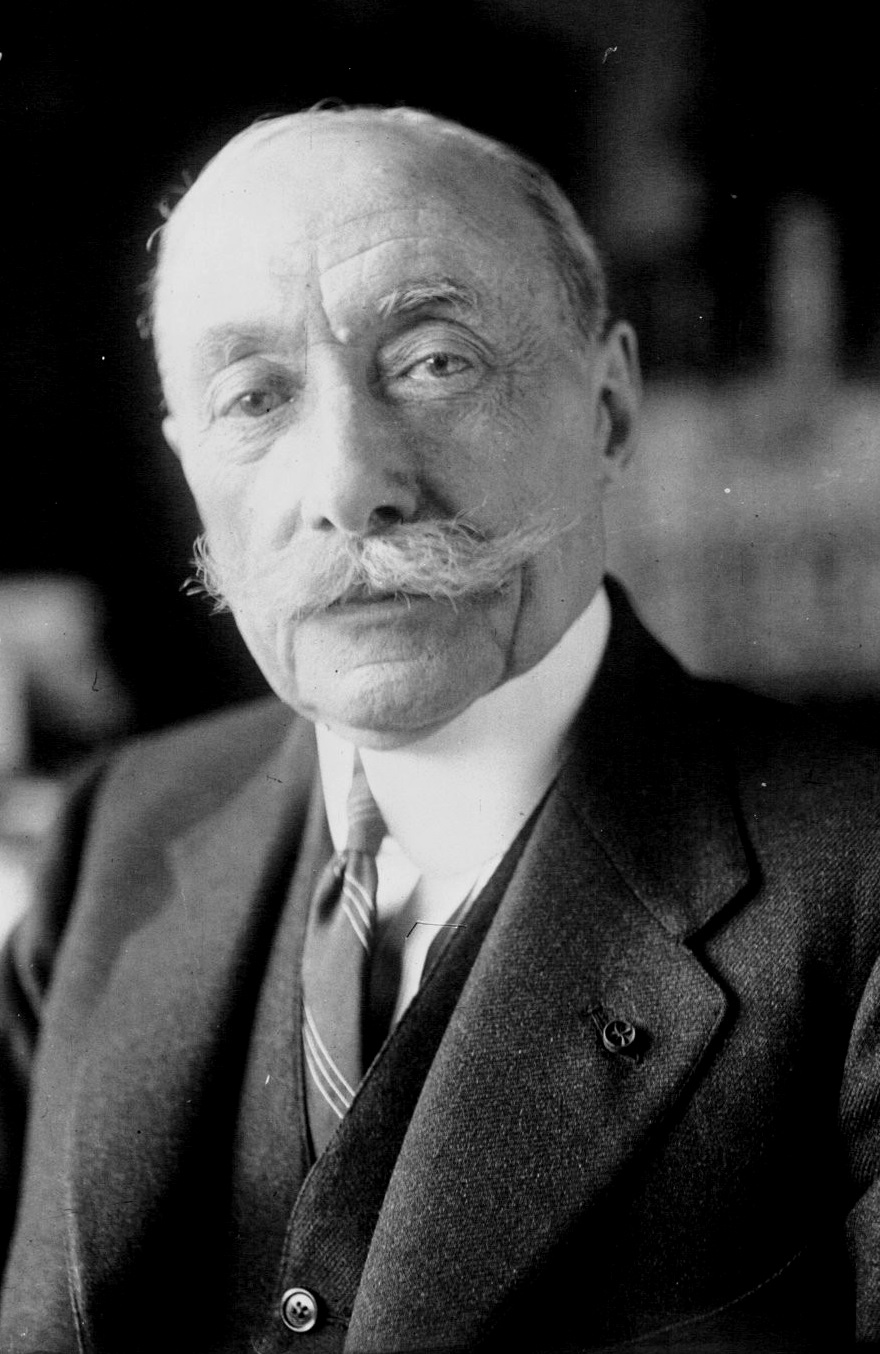
André Messager, 1921

Mirette is an opéra comique in three acts composed by André Messager, first produced at the Savoy Theatre, London, on 3 July 1894.

Mirette exists in two distinct versions. The first version of the libretto was written in French by Michel Carré but this was never performed. English lyrics were written by Frederic E. Weatherly, and English dialogue based on the Carré libretto was written by Harry Greenbank. This first English version of the opera ran for 41 performances, closing on 11 August 1894. This was the shortest run of any opera produced at the Savoy Theatre under the management of Richard D'Oyly Carte. The second version, advertised as a "new version with new lyrics by Adrian Ross," ran for 61 performances, from 6 October 1894 to 6 December 1894.

Both versions essentially tell the same story, with the second version emphasising comedy over the romance of the first version. The music has been mostly forgotten. However, one song ("Long ago in Alcala") became very popular in the United States in the early years of the twentieth century, though it was not credited as being from Mirette. The piece featured Savoy regulars including Courtice Pounds (Picorin), Rosina Brandram (Marquise), Scott Russell (Bertuccio), Emmie Owen (Zerbinette), Florence Perry (Bianca), R. Scott Fishe (Gerard de Montigny), and Walter Passmore (Bobinet). Richard Temple joined in the revised version, as did the experienced singer Florence St. John, who made her Savoy debut in the work.

== Background ==
=== Genesis and production ===
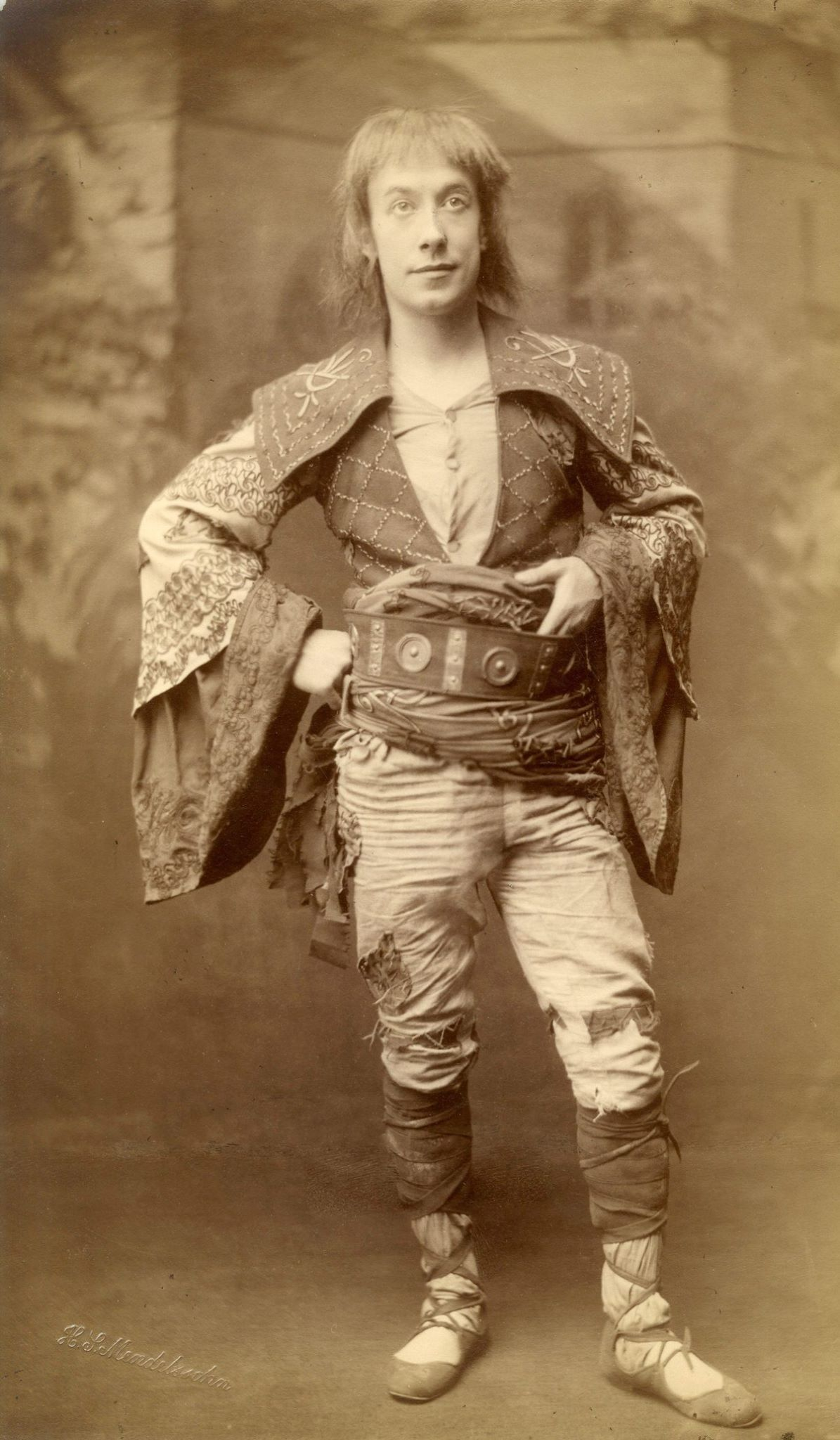
Walter Passmore as Bobinet

Gilbert and Sullivan's Utopia Limited was playing more weakly than its producer, Richard D'Oyly Carte, had expected, and he anticipated that he would need a new work for the Savoy Theatre for the summer of 1894. Messager was enjoying a growing international reputation, and Carte had already produced Messager's opera La Basoche at his Royal English Opera House in 1891–92. Carte commissioned Messager to write Mirette, his first opera for British audiences. Later Messager works would prove to be more successful in England, including The Little Michus (1897), Véronique (which became a hit in London in 1904, six years after its 1898 Paris premiere), and Monsieur Beaucaire (1919, based on the novel by Booth Tarkington).

The libretto for Mirette was written in French by Carré. Some of the music was composed before Weatherly translated and rewrote the lyrics and Greenback translated the dialogue. To assist Messager in what was for him (at the time) an unfamiliar idiom, he enlisted the help of the songwriter Hope Temple, née Dotie (Alice Maude) Davis, who later became his second wife. She may even have written some of the songs; but though Messager acknowledged her help, it is not clear what, if anything, she contributed to the text. The Grove Dictionary of Music and Musicians lists her as possible co-author; Messager's biographer Benoit Duteurtre unequivocally names her as such.

The original version of Mirette opened at the Savoy Theatre, London, on 3 July 1894 and closed on 11 August 1894. It draws heavily on Balfe's opera The Bohemian Girl (1843) and uses various shopworn theatrical devices and conventions, including the gypsy background (featured in The Bohemian Girl as well), a romance across class and station, the desertion of the bride at her betrothal ceremony, and the antics of the comedian. These would have been very familiar to London audiences at the time. Furthermore, this romantic type of opera was out of place at the Savoy Theatre, which was the home of Gilbert and Sullivan and their unique kind of less sentimental comic opera.

Carte asked the popular lyricist Adrian Ross to rewrite the piece with as much emphasis on comedy as possible. Ross reduced the romantic parts (though he retained the Mirette-Gerard-Picorin-Bianca story) while boosting the comic part of Bobinet for Passmore, making the role of the Marquise lighter, and emphasising past Savoy successes by strengthening the subplot regarding the past love between the Marquise and the Baron. He also rewrote existing lyrics and introduced more opportunities for dance numbers. Though Walter Passmore had created smaller roles in Jane Annie and Utopia Limited, the role of Bobinet was his first real starring part. Later in 1894, Passmore named his new daughter Mirette, perhaps in acknowledgement of his success in this breakout role. The cast changes, including adding another Savoy favourite, Richard Temple, as the Baron and engaging the soprano Florence St. John as Mirette. The revised version opened on 6 October 1894 and ran for 61 performances, until 6 December.

=== Reception ===
The early reviews for Mirette were mixed at best. Evening News and Post wrote that "There has been nothing at the Savoy for a long time prettier or more elaborate in a spectacular way than Mirette, and it would be ungenerous to grumble at the quality of the humour when it affords such a feast of beauty for eye and ear." The Globe disagreed: "English audiences have been accustomed to expect something more in the librettos of comic operas than a mere dishing-up of old situations and conventional characters.... The story is singularly destitute of interest or originality." Daily Graphic was disappointed by both the libretto and the music, while The Stage thought that "Messager's music is invariably characterised by smooth melody and graceful expressiveness, but in Mirette one feels that a little variation from these commendable qualities would now and again be welcome." Vanity Fair called the plot "feeble" and "trivial", The Times unfavourably compared the piece with earlier Savoy operas, and Daily Telegraph complained: "It does not appear that the composer is gifted with the keen sense of humour which works written for the Savoy have often exemplified. In the merriest situations, his strains refuse to laugh, and flow on elegantly, with perfect blandness and good breeding." The reviewer in the magazine Judy wrote, "Despite the poor book, the poorer lyrics, and the poorest dialogue,—despite, too, the desperately unfunny funny man—Mirette must not be neglected. Messager's music more than compensates one for these defects; and I shall not be surprised to hear of business at the Savoy going swimmingly".

After the rewrite, Mirette fared better with the critics. Daily Telegraph now wrote, "Mirette quickly made a host of new friends. Applause ruled long and loud; in fact, the outburst of enthusiasm which followed the final descent of the curtain brought with it a reminder of the palmy days when the Gilbert-Sullivan alliance was at its strongest." The Globe proclaimed that "The new version is in every respect so immeasurably superior to its predecessor that there is now very little in the work with which to find fault." Morning Advertiser recommended that the public pay a "speedy visit to the Savoy", and The Era noted, "The presence of Miss Florence St John has caused the other performers to act and sing with greater animation".

The piece was remembered fondly by some Savoyards. In 1906, as a professor of singing and stage manager at the Royal College of Music, Richard Temple was asked to direct a work from his earlier career for the first performance of the Cambridge University Operatic Club, at the Scala Theatre. He was asked to select a piece "from which students would learn the craft of worthwhile light opera." Instead of choosing The Mikado or The Yeomen of the Guard, for instance, he chose Mirette.

== Roles and casts ==
The original cast names are followed by the revival cast names if different:

- Mirette, a gypsy maiden (soprano) – Maud Ellicott; Kate Rolla
- Gerard de Montigny, nephew of the Marquise (baritone) – Scott Fishe
- Picorin, a gypsy, in love with Mirette (tenor) – Courtice Pounds
- Bianca, daughter of the Baron Van Den Berg (soprano) – Florence Perry
- The Marquise de Montigny (contralto) – Rosina Brandram
- Francal, the gypsy chief (bass-baritone) – Avon Saxon; John Coates
- The Baron Van Den Berg (bass) – John Coates; Richard Temple
- Bobinet, a gypsy (comic baritone) – Walter Passmore
- Bertuccio, another gypsy (baritone) – Scott Russell
- Zerbinette, a gypsy girl (mezzo-soprano) (so named in the revised version; in the original, the character is unnamed) – Emmie Owen
- Max, Gerard's gamekeeper (speaking role) (original version only) – Herbert Ralland
- The Burgomaster (baritone) (original version only) – John Coates
- The Notary (baritone) (original version only) – Herbert Ralland

Notes:

- Emmie Owen played Mirette in August while Ellicott went on her long-awaited honeymoon.
- Kate Rolla was replaced as Mirette first by Elaine Gryce and then by Florence St. John
- The first version of Mirette is the only Savoy Opera where an actor played more than one (named) part in London (although roles in Utopia, Limited were doubled on tour). John Coates played both Baron Van Den Berg and the Burgomaster. Herbert Ralland played both Max and the Notary.

== Synopsis ==
The scene is Flanders in 1785. Mirette is a foundling living among the Gypsies. At the beginning of the opera, the gypsy chief Francal asks Mirette to choose among the gypsy bachelors for a husband, but she is unable to choose, despite the fact that Picorin, one of the gypsy crew, is in love with her. She believes instead that she is destined for a better life and dreams that her unknown parents are of the nobility. The Gypsies have camped on the property owned by the Marquise de Montigny. Mirette falls asleep by the campfire and wakes to find Gerard, nephew of the Marquise, standing over her. Gerard is entranced by her beauty, and she finds herself similarly attracted. However, he leads the arrest of the Gypsies for trespassing. Mirette and Picorin are taken to the chateau of the Marquise to become servants in her household.

In act two, Mirette is discovered one month later in the service of the world-weary Marquise, who is planning the engagement party for Gerard and Bianca, the convent-raised daughter of the Baron Van Den Berg. Gerard's attraction to Mirette has grown to infatuation. When the guests gather for the signing of the marriage contract, the Marquise commands Mirette to sing and dance a bohemian dance as the evening's principal entertainment and as a way to point out the vast differences in station between Mirette and Gerard, thus killing any infatuation they may have for each other. During the dance, during which Francal and the other Gypsies join in the chorus, Gerard cannot take his eyes off Mirette, a fact noticed by Bianca and all the guests. However, the Marquise manoeuvres Bianca into Gerard's close company, humiliating Mirette, who escapes from the chateau with the other Gypsies. Just as he is about to sign the marriage contract, Gerard hears the Gypsies singing in the distance. He throws down his pen and rushes madly from the scene. (In the revised version of the opera, Gerard runs off with Mirette and the Gypsies to live the colourful life of a bohemian.)

Act three finds Mirette and Picorin at a village fair three weeks later. Picorin is still unable to express himself; the two indulge in a nicely conceived duet where they cover their emotions for each other behind eating a meal uncomfortably. Gerard, the Marquise, Bianca, and the Baron are all also at the fair. (In the revised version of the opera, Gerard is at the fair in Mirette's company, doing a bad job as a gypsy performer.) Mirette realizes that Bianca loves Gerard and arranges for the two of them to reconcile. She also realizes the extent of her love for Picorin, and the two of them also arrange to wed. (In the revised version of the opera, not only do Mirette and Picorin and Gerard and Bianca end up together; the Marquise and the Baron, lovers of old, are also on their way to the altar.)

The humour of the opera is concentrated in the character of Bobinet, one of the gypsy crew. In the revised version of the opera, Bobinet is paired with Zerbinette, another gypsy.

== List of musical numbers in the first version ==
Act I

- No. 1. "Ha, ha! A splendid story!" (Bertuccio, Mirette, Picorin, Francal and Chorus)
- No. 2. Bohemian Song: "The home of the Zingari!" (Mirette and Chorus)
- No. 3. "Dost thou remember still the day?" (Francal and Chorus)
- No. 4. "Ha ha! It's quite amusing!" (Mirette and Chorus)
- No. 5. "Look, look, I say! Here's Bobinet!" (Chorus)
- No. 6. "The Song of the Duck" (Bobinet and Chorus)
- No. 7. "When I was young, I went a-dreaming" (Picorin)
- No. 8. "Long ago in Alcala" (Bobinet)
- No. 9. "She is asleep! Ah, how fair is she!" (Gerard and Mirette)
- No. 10. "Oh, we've been up and we've been down" (Chorus)
- No. 10a. Burglary Song, "Oh, we've been visiting our friends" (Francal and Chorus)
- No. 11. Act 1 Finale: "Good evening, gentlemen!" (Burgomaster, Bobinet, Max, Francal, Picorin, Mirette, Gerard, Soldiers and Gypsies)

Act II

- No. 12. Old Ballad, "So forward through the fading light" (Mirette)
- No. 13. "If love were calculation" (Gerard)
- No. 14. "Hast thou forgot the hour we met?" (Gerard and Mirette)
- No. 15. "Now for the programme" (Marquise and Bobinet)
- No. 16. "When Noah went aboard the ark" (Bobinet)
- No. 17. "But yesterday in convent grey" (Bianca)
- No. 18. "Life is a fairyland, with wonders hung" (Marquise)
- No. 19. "Obedient to your kind command" (Chorus)
- No. 19a. "Our best congratulations" (Marquise, Gerard, Bianca, Francal, Mirette, Chorus)
- No. 20. "Who is like the Zingara" (Mirette and Chorus)
- No. 20a. Dance - Bobinet and Zerbinette
- No. 21. Act 2 Finale "Take your places all" (Notary, Bobinet, Gerard, Marquise, Mirette and Chorus)

Act III

- No. 22. "Oh, the light of the golden weather" (Chorus)
- No. 22a. "Walk up, walk up, and see the show" (Mirette, Picorin and Chorus)
- No. 23. "Here's the news of the day" (Bobinet and Chorus)
- No. 24. "That night you went away" (Bianca and Mirette)
- No. 25. "Come, march along, and make a din" (Chorus)
- No. 26. "So the past is dead in your fickle heart" (Marquise)
- No. 27. "What! breakfast really ready, sir?" (Mirette and Picorin)
- No. 28. "Yes, it is past! the dream is done" (Gerard)
- No. 28a. "Does he remember the words he has spoken?" (Bianca and Gerard)
- No. 29. Act 3 Finale "When the gay ring-a-ding of the bells" (Bobinet and Chorus)

== List of musical numbers in the second version ==
Act I

- No. 1. "From Egypt's royal line" (Bertuccio, Francal, Zerbinette and Chorus)
- No. 2. "The good old earth in the age of gold" (Bertuccio and Chorus)
- No. 3. "The Song of the Duck" (Bobinet and Chorus)
- No. 4. "We have missed the voice of our little queen" (Chorus, Bertuccio, Francal and Mirette)
- No. 4a. Bohemian Song "Roaming on with never a rest" (Mirette and Chorus)
- No. 5. "When winter gales were loud and winter snows were flying" (Francal and Chorus)
- No. 6. "Ha! ha! ha! ha! it’s so amusing" (Mirette and Chorus)
- No. 7. "Now stars above the forest glimmer" (Picorin)
- No. 8. "Long ago in Alcala" (Bobinet)
- No. 9. "Up a tree!" (Bobinet, Gerard, Baron)
- No. 10. "Nay, do not fly from me!" (Gerard and Mirette)
- No. 11. "We’ve called as pillagers" (Chorus)
- No. 12. Pantomime Dance (Zerbinette, Picorin and Francal)
- No. 13. Act 1 Finale "Though the wood is very dark" (Baron, Bobinet, Mirette, Gerard, Picorin, Gypsies and Soldiers)

Act II

- No. 14. Old Ballad "So forward through the fading light" (Mirette)
- No. 15. "In quiet convent closes the rosebud maidens grow" (Gerard)
- No. 16. "Don't mind me!" (Gerard, Mirette and Picorin)
- No. 17. "The programme I’ll discuss with you" (Marquise and Bobinet)
- No. 18. "But yesterday, in convent gray" (Bianca)
- No. 19. "When Noah sailed his good old Ark" (Baron, Gerard and Picorin)
- No. 20. "Obedient to your kind command" (Chorus)
- No. 20a. Fan Song, "When Eve was mistress Adam" (Marquise and Chorus)
- No. 21. Act 2 Finale "We come, Madame la Marquise" (Chorus)
  - "Once a cavalier of Spain loved a maid of low degree" (Mirette and Chorus)
  - "Gerard, this is really scandalous" (Ensemble)

Act III

- No. 22. "Oh, the light of the golden summer" (Chorus)
- No. 23. Long Bow Song, "Good William Tell was a mighty one" (Bobinet, Zerbinette and Chorus)
- No. 24. "Our recent circumstances have been really so unpleasant" (Zerbinette, Marquise, Picorin, Bobinet and Baron)
- No. 25. "There was once a pretty peasant" (Mirette)
- No. 26. "Hurrah! Hurrah! for the merry yeomen" (Chorus)
  - Dance - Bobinet and Zerbinette
- No. 27. "Ah, Monsieur le Baron!" (Marquise and Baron)
- No. 28. Act 3 Finale. "Oh! the pride of the Belgian bowmen" (Mirette, Picorin, Francal, Bobinet, Zerbinette and Chorus)

== See also ==
Savoy Opera

== Sources ==
- Duteurtre, Benoît (2003). André Messager (in French). Paris: Klincksieck. ISBN 978-2-252-03451-4.
- Rollins, Cyril; R. John Witts (1962). The D'Oyly Carte Opera Company in Gilbert and Sullivan Operas: A Record of Productions, 1875–1961. London: Michael Joseph. OCLC 504581419.
