= Courtice Pounds =

British singer and actor (1862–1927)

Courtice Pounds

Charles Courtice Pounds (30 May 1861 – 21 December 1927) was an English singer and actor known for his performances in the tenor roles of the Savoy Operas with the D'Oyly Carte Opera Company and his later roles in Shakespeare plays and Edwardian musical comedies.

As a young member of D'Oyly Carte, Pounds played tenor leads in the Gilbert and Sullivan operas in New York and on tour in Britain and continental Europe from 1881 to 1887. After being promoted to principal tenor at the Savoy Theatre, he created the principal tenor roles in The Yeomen of the Guard (1888), The Gondoliers (1889), The Nautch Girl (1891) and Haddon Hall (1892), and played other principal roles.

After leaving D'Oyly Carte in 1895, Pounds became a prominent performer during the transition of musical theatre from comic opera to musical comedy, creating roles in the West End in both genres from the late 1890s to the 1920s. The operettas and musical comedies in which he starred included La poupée, The Duchess of Dantzic, The Belle of Mayfair, Princess Caprice, and the long-running hits Chu Chin Chow and Lilac Time. He also played in variety and was well received in comedy roles in Shakespeare plays during the same period.

== Life and career ==
=== Early years ===
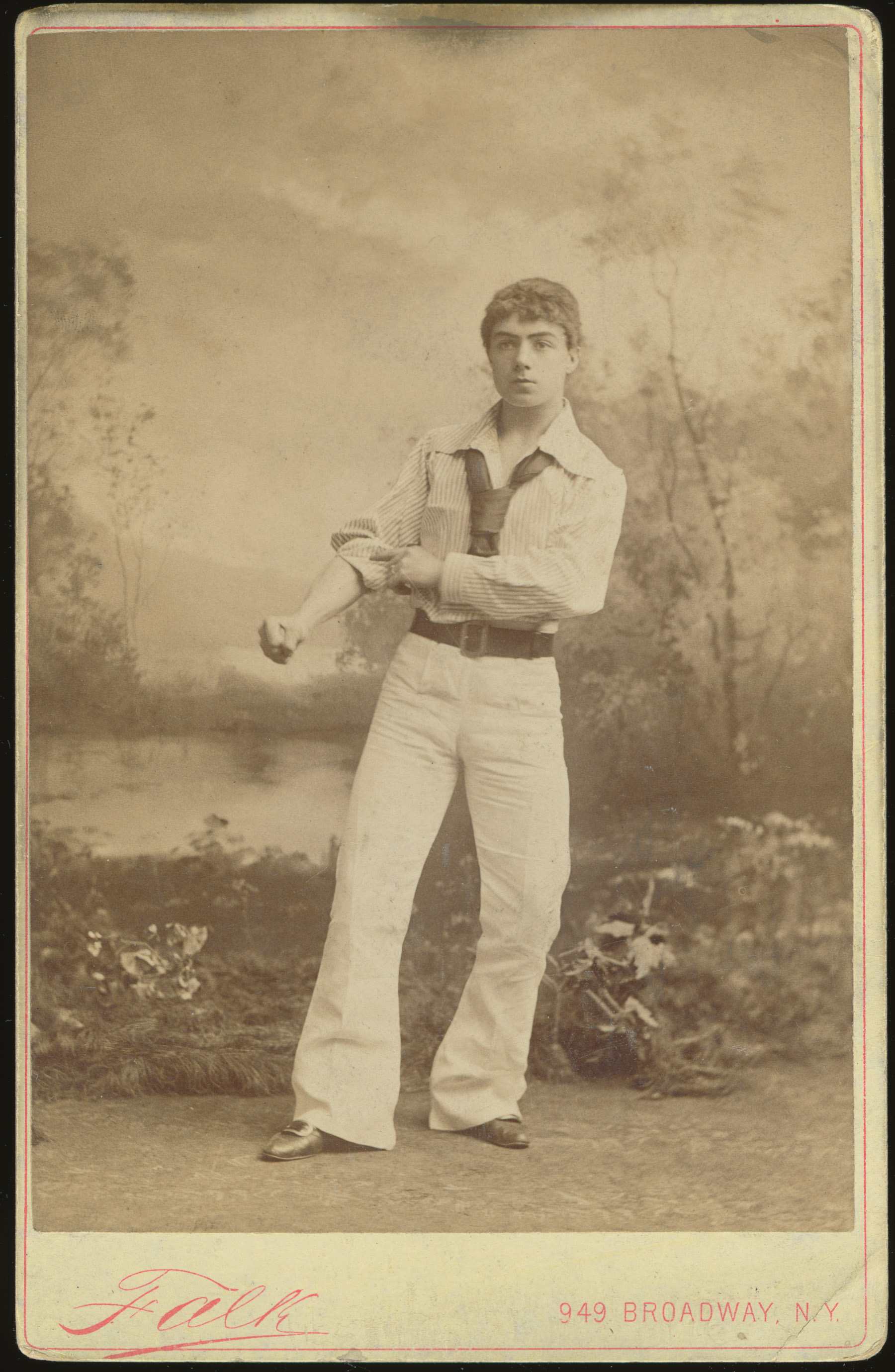
As Richard in Ruddygore (New York, 1887)

Pounds was born in Pimlico, London, the only son and eldest child of five, of Charles Pounds (1833–1903), a builder, and his wife Mary Ann Jane, née Curtice (1833–1877), a well-known singer. After his mother died, his father remarried and had four more sons. He was educated at St. Mark's College, Chelsea. Pounds was a choirboy at St. Saviour's church, Pimlico, and also sang at St. Stephen's church, Kensington, and the Italian Church, Hatton Garden. When his voice broke, he went to work for his father, but continued to study music. He studied at the Royal Academy of Music and returned to St. Stephen's as tenor soloist. He sang in variety at the Royal Aquarium theatre for six months while working as a builder.

=== D'Oyly Carte years ===
Pounds joined the D'Oyly Carte Opera Company in 1881 in the chorus of the original production of Gilbert and Sullivan's Patience, understudying the company's principal tenor, Durward Lely, for whom he went on in November 1881 at the new Savoy Theatre. The theatrical newspaper The Era, and The Morning Post both singled him out as "a young tenor of high promise." He soon played the role of Mr. Wranglebury in the curtain raiser Mock Turtles. Arthur Sullivan recognised Pounds's talent and persuaded him to remain with D'Oyly Carte rather than join Christy's Minstrels, from whom he had received an offer. At the end of 1882, Pounds began touring in Iolanthe in the leading tenor role of Earl Tolloller. In 1884, he toured as Prince Hilarion in the first provincial production of Princess Ida,

In 1885 Pounds toured as the Defendant in Trial by Jury, a role he later played in numerous benefit performances in London and elsewhere. He also toured in the role of Ralph in H.M.S. Pinafore. Later that year, he travelled to New York to play Nanki-Poo, in D'Oyly Carte's first American production of The Mikado. After that, he toured in Germany and Austria as Nanki-Poo. In 1886, he returned to the Savoy to fill in for Lely for two weeks as Nanki-Poo, then rejoined the European touring company in Vienna.

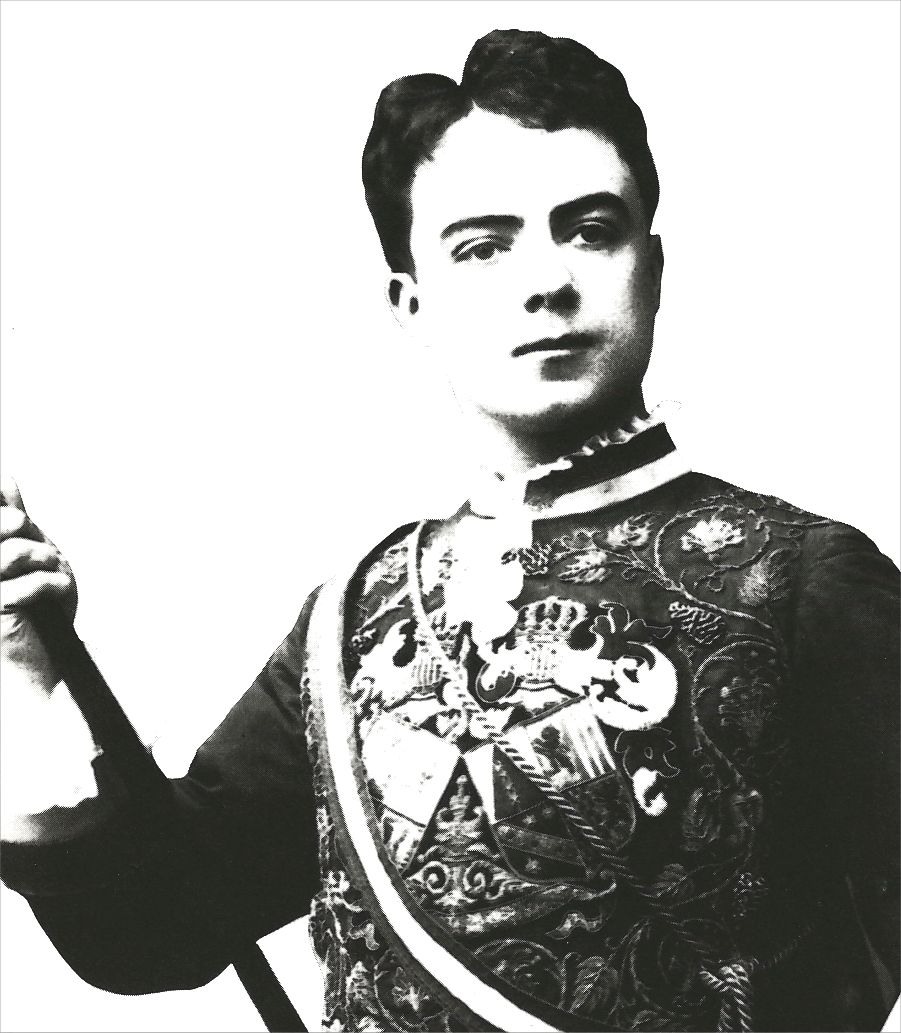
As Marco in The Gondoliers

In late 1886, Pounds joined the company of John Stetson, the American manager, playing Hilarion and Nanki-Poo in authorised productions in New York. The Era wrote, "Mr Courtice Pounds sang the part of Hilarion in a very nice voice, acted it in a very nice way, looked nice enough to capture all the girls' hearts and was a very nice young man altogether." In 1887 he played Grosvenor in Patience in Boston. He then returned to England to rehearse Gilbert and Sullivan's new opera, Ruddygore, performing in two matinee performances as Richard Dauntless, before sailing for New York again to play Richard there. Pounds stayed in New York to appear in Paul Lacome's The Marquis and Charles Lecocq's Madelon.

In May 1888, Pounds returned to London to create the part of Colonel Fairfax in The Yeomen of the Guard at the Savoy Theatre. His notices were excellent. The Times called him "a better actor and a better tenor than any of his predecessors." The Era judged him "the most efficient tenor the Savoy has had … a pure tenor voice, artistic and pleasing … clever acting and a good stage appearance." The Observer called him "that rara avis, a tenor able to act." He created several more lead roles at the Savoy: Marco in The Gondoliers in 1889; Indru in The Nautch Girl in 1891; the Rev. Henry Sandford in The Vicar of Bray in 1892; and John Manners in Haddon Hall later that year.

Pounds as John Manners, with Lucille Hill in Haddon Hall (1892)

Pounds left the D'Oyly Carte company in 1892. He appeared in another West End management, as Vincent in Ma mie Rosette, by Lacome and Ivan Caryll (1892). In mid-1893, Pounds produced his own company touring an "operatic triple bill" in which he played roles in each piece: Harry Croyland in the operetta The Lass that Loved a Sailor, by Bond Andrews to a libretto by Neville Doone; Harry Hamper in the vaudeville The Burglar and the Bishop, by Wellesley Batson to a libretto by J. Jocelyn Coghill; and Charley Dacre in Helen of Troy Up to Date; or, The Statue Shop, by John Crook to a farcical, pantomimic libretto by Wilton Jones. He brought with him on this tour several D'Oyly Carte colleagues, including Pounds's romantic partner, Millicent Pyne. Pounds returned to the West End as Ange Pitout in La fille de Madame Angot (1893); Connor Kennedy in Haydn Parry's Miami (1893); and Mark Mainstay in Howard Talbot's Wapping Old Stairs (1894).

Returning to D'Oyly Carte in 1894, Pounds played Picorin in Mirette and created the role of Count Vasquez de Gonzago in The Chieftain late in 1894. The Morning Post described him in this role as "the jeune premier par excellence of the operatic stage." In 1895 he went on tour briefly with D'Oyly Carte as Picorin, Vasquez, and the Rev. Henry Sandford before leaving D'Oyly Carte again. He then travelled to Australia, appearing in the first half of 1896 with J. C. Williamson's opera company in Yeomen, The Gondoliers, Miss Decima, The Vicar of Bray and Ma Mie Rosette.

=== Musicals, operetta and Shakespeare clowns ===
In June 1896, Pounds returned to Britain. He toured as Mr. Shepherd in the musical comedy Belinda during the latter part of that year, and briefly played in music hall in January 1897, appearing at the Palace Theatre of Varieties. He also sang in concert at St. James's Hall with Marie Tempest and Ben Davies. In February, Pounds returned to the West End, playing Lancelot in Edmond Audran's La Poupée, which ran until September 1898. Lancelot, a comic role, marked the beginning of Pounds's transition from juvenile leads to character and comedy parts in both straight and musical theatre. This was succeeded by two more comic operas, both by Justin Clérice: The Royal Star, in which Pounds played Jack Horton, and The Coquette, in which he played Michele.

Pounds in The Blue Moon (1905)

Pounds continued to perform in comic opera and operetta. In 1900 he starred in a revival of Dorothy. In 1903 he took the title role in Hervé's opéra bouffe Chilpéric, and in 1905 he starred in The Blue Moon. In 1912, he played the title role in Herbert Beerbohm Tree's production of Jacques Offenbach's Orpheus in the Underground. In 1916 he appeared as Harry Benn in the premiere of Ethel Smyth's comic opera The Boatswain's Mate, described by The Manchester Guardian as "something of a triumph for Miss Rosina Buckman and Mr. Courtice Pounds as well as for Dr. Ethel Smyth."

In the first quarter of the 20th century, Pounds appeared regularly in London in a range of roles ranging from Shakespeare to variety. He established himself as a popular Shakespearean character actor with Tree's company, as the clown Feste in Twelfth Night (1901), the preposterous Sir Hugh Evans in The Merry Wives of Windsor, and Touchstone in As You Like It (1907), of which The Times said he "acts even better than he sings, which is, of course, saying a good deal." The Manchester Guardian wrote of him, "Courtice Pounds had all that Shakespeare asked of his clowns – the gift of song and a robustness of comedy that could change at will to a tender and poignant moment."

As Touchstone in As You Like It

From 1903 onwards, Pounds became especially known for his performances in musical comedies. The first of these was The Cherry Girl (1903), presented by Seymour Hicks, in which Pounds played Starlight. Prominent among his musical comedy roles were Papillon in The Duchess of Dantzic (1903), which he created in both London (1903) and New York (1905); Hugh Meredith in The Belle of Mayfair (1906), with his sister Louie in the cast; the lead in Leo Fall's The Merry Farmer (Der fidele Bauer; 1907) and Jasomir in Fall's Princess Caprice (1912). He appeared in The Laughing Husband, the English version of the operetta Der lachende Ehemann by Edmund Eysler, in both London (1913) and New York (1914). He was Ali Baba in the long-running Chu Chin Chow (beginning in 1916, he starred in the role for over 2,000 performances); a similar role in Cairo (1921) and Franz Schubert in Lilac Time (1922–1924). Of the last, The Times commented, "Pounds is delightful as the moping composer". The musical theatre authority Kurt Gänzl writes that Pounds's performance in these roles proved him "the most complete and versatile singing actor of his age." In 1924, his last London role was in the Spanish zarzuela adaptation The First Kiss, and before retiring, he toured in Lilac Time and the French operetta adaptation Just a Kiss.

Pounds returned occasionally to variety, including a 1905 appearance at the London Coliseum. In 1910 he returned briefly to production, mounting a musical comedy, A Modern Othello, in Birmingham. He also appeared in a film, The Broken Melody (1916).

=== Family, personal life and death ===
Pounds with Cicely Courtneidge in Princess Caprice

In 1927, Pounds's health gave way, and he was unable to perform. A fund was set up to provide for him, and fellow-artists giving their services in fund-raising included Seymour Hicks and his wife Ellaline Terriss, Evelyn Laye, Huntley Wright, Walter Passmore, Derek Oldham, Gertrude Lawrence, and Geoffrey Toye. More than £3,000 was raised.

Four of Pounds's sisters (Lily, Louie – a successful actress in her own right – Nancy, and Rosy) also appeared with the D'Oyly Carte Opera Company. Pounds was married to D'Oyly Carte performer Jessie Louise Murray Wilson (1861–1953) in 1883, They had no children. He never divorced his wife, but the W. S. Gilbert scholar Brian Jones states that Pounds "seems to have had a roving eye". He had a long relationship with another former D'Oyly Carte actress, Millicent Pyne (born Millicent Pye, 1873–1965), and in an 1895 divorce case, evidence was introduced that the respondent Mary Hardie Lewis had had an affair with Pounds. Around the turn of the century, he set up home with Irish actress Mary Gertrude Cranfield (1880–1973), with whom he had four children.

Pounds died in Surbiton, Kingston upon Thames, in 1927, aged 66, of bronchitis and endocarditis. His funeral at St Mark's Church, Surbiton, was attended by his common-law widow and four children, and representatives of the theatrical profession.

== Recordings ==
Pounds recorded several discs for His Master's Voice during World War I. With Rosina Buckman and Frederick Ranalow, he sang the trio "The first thing to do is to get rid of the body", from The Boatswain's Mate, accompanied by the composer, Dame Ethel Smyth (all three singers had appeared in the world premiere performance of the opera). From the same opera, he recorded the ballad "When rocked on the billows". His other recordings of this period were Balfe's setting of Tennyson's "Come into the garden, Maud", "When a Pullet is Plump", from Chu Chin Chow, "Song of the Bowl", from My Lady Frayle, and, with Violet Essex, "Any time's kissing time", from Chu Chin Chow. In 1923 he recorded four numbers from Lilac Time for Vocalion ("Dream Enthralling"; "I want to carve your name"; "The Golden Song"; and "Underneath the lilac bough") with Clara Butterworth and Percy Heming. His only Gilbert and Sullivan recording ("Is Life a Boon?", 1916) was never issued.
