= Frederick Colin Courtice =

Australian medical scientist

Frederick Colin Courtice FAA (26 March 1911, Bundaberg - 29 February 1992, Sydney), was an Australian medical scientist who became an expert in lymphatic physiology.

His father, Frederick Courtice, was a Queensland politician.

Courtice served as a council member (1964–1966) and vice-president (1965–1966) of the Australian Academy of Science. He was also chairman of the National Radiation Committee (1965–1973), an Australian delegate to UNESCO (1962, 1964), and a member of the committee responsible for establishing the National Heart Foundation.

== Qualifications and recognition ==
- 1932 BSc (Hons I), Syd
- 1932 Rhodes Scholarship (Honours School of Physiology, Oxford)
- 1934 MA Oxon
- 1935 DPhil Oxon
- 1937 LRCP
- 1937 MRCS
- 1946 MA Oxon
- 1946 DSc Syd
- 1946 Honorary FRACS
- 1948 Director of the Kanematsu Memorial Institute of Pathology at Sydney Hospital
- 1954 Elected FAA
- 1958-1974 Foundation Professor in the John Curtin School for Medical Research (ANU)
- 1960 FRACP
- 1976 Emeritus Professor
