= Sylvia Gerrish =

American singer and actress

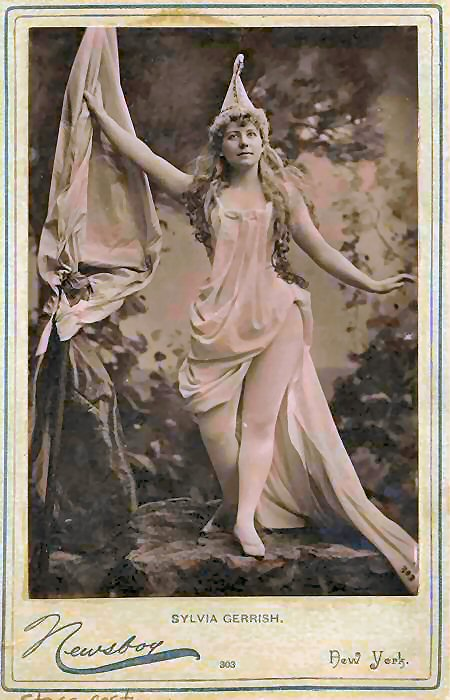
- NYPL Digital Gallery
- Born: Lillian M. Rollins; May 1860; Big Oak Flat, California, U.S.
- Died: December 8, 1906 (aged 46); Brooklyn, New York, U.S.
- Occupation: Musical comedy actress
- Spouse: Henry G. Hilton (m. 1901; died 1905)

Sylvia Gerrish (born Lillian M. Rollins; May 1860 – December 8, 1906) was an American musical theatre performer who found success in New York and London in the 1880s and early 1890s. She was known as "The Girl with the Poetical Legs".

Gerrish began her career in San Francisco theatres in 1880 and commenced a long tour with Willie Edouin's company the following year in a piece called Dreams. She continued touring until 1883, and in 1884 she began to play roles on Broadway, especially at Bijou Opera House and the Casino Theatre, achieving considerable popularity. She travelled to London in the early 1890s, where she attracted a large following, but soon after her return in 1893, her career ended.

In the late 1880s, she became known for a love affair with Henry G. Hilton that cost the millionaire's son his fortune. After Hilton's first wife died, Gerrish lived with him in increasing poverty. Hilton died in 1905, and the following year Gerrish died alone and in debt, in Hilton's dilapidated mansion, at the age of 46.

== Early life and career ==
Gerrish was born in Big Oak Flat, California, the daughter of, Holman C. Rollins, a native of New Hampshire, and Sylvia Gerrish, originally from Maine. Her parents were initially drawn to California by the Gold Rush of 1849, though her father later gave up on prospecting to work as a railroad flagman. Gerrish was raised in West Oakland, California, where she attended Prescott School and later Oakland High School. She performed in public during church services at Hamilton's Independent Church as a soloist accompanied by a church organist.

Under her mother's maiden name, Gerrish's first known professional stage performance was in the French comic opera The Weathercock (La girouette, by Emile Hémery and Henri Bocage, with music by Auguste Cœdès), at San Francisco's Bush Street Theatre in July 1880 with Emelie Melville's Comic Opera Company. On September 21, 1880, she opened in Aladdin, as Princess Badroulbadour, at Baldwin's Theatre on Market Streetin San Francisco, and the following month at the Bush Street Theatre she appeared in a revival of H. M. S. Pinafore. At Christmas 1880, she appeared in Francis Burnand's musical burlesque Ixion, or the Man at the Wheel staged at the Standard Theatre on Bush Street, San Francisco.

== Peak years ==
Gerrish joined the Willie Edouin's Sparks company in September 1881 playing "the fascinating contralto" in Dreams, or Bink’s Photographic Gallery, a two-act musical written by Edouin and Nat Childs. She first appeared in the piece at Hooley's Theatre in Chicago and then toured with it well into the following year. Gerrish supported Alexander Caufman in October 1882 at Atlanta’s DeGive's Opera House in Fred Marsden’s melodrama Called to Account and in July 1883 she supported Henry E. Dixey in a burlesque of Gilbert and Sullivan's Patience at Boston’s Bijou Theatre. Later in that month, at the same venue, Gerrish played Lady Magnolia in the Stephens and Solomon operatic extravaganza Virginia, and in September 1883, she played the same role to positive reviews at Philadelphia’s Arch Street Theatre.

By January of the following year, Gerrish was a regular player at New York’s Bijou Opera House, some two years after she had first played there in Dreams. She spent the next nine years on the New York stage playing such roles as Fleta in the Gilbert and Sullivan opera Iolanthe in 1883 at the Standard Theatre, Cousin Hebe in a revival of H.M.S. Pinafore in July 1887 at the Madison Square Theatre; Marie Bartlett, a role she created in the Owen Westford comic opera Soldiers and Sweethearts at the Bijou Theatre in August 1887; Jomine in Madelon, an adaptation of the French operetta La Petite Mademoiselle by Charles Lecocq that opened at the Casino Theatre in December 1887; Konrad in January 1889 in a Casino adaptation of the operetta Nadjy by Francis Chassaigne; Phoebe Merryll in the original American production of Gilbert and Sullivan's The Yeoman of the Guard that made its Casino Theatre debut in October 1889; Adolph de Valladolid from May 1890 at the Casino in an English adaptation of Les brigands by Jacques Offenbach; the Abbess in The Drum Major, an adaption of Offenbach's La fille du tambour-major (The Drum-Major's Daughter), that opened at the Casino in September 1890; Delauney in a November 1890 Casino revival of Edward Jakobowski's hit comic opera Erminie; and Gustave de Parmessol in Uncle Celestin, a comic opera by Edmond Audran, Maurice Ordonneau and Henry Keroul, that opened at the Casino in February 1892.

Gerrish made her London debut on August 3, 1893, at the Trafalgar Square Theatre playing the title role in Mam'zelle Nitouche by the French composer Hervé. The press reported: "Her vivacity was much applauded and her songs were encored." Not long after her return to New York in September 1893, Gerrish fell seriously ill with peritonitis and at one point was not expected to survive. By the first days of October, though, her condition had improved, and her doctors considered her to be out of danger. That December she appeared in a B. F. Keith vaudeville show at the Bijou Theatre in Philadelphia with Marshall P. Wilder and other New York stage stars of the day.

Gerrish was not considered by some critics to be a great singer or actress, but she had stage presence, enhanced by an attractive figure (her legs were particularly admired), that by her early thirties was becoming harder to maintain. In the 1880s, she was one of the most popular actresses on the New York stage, especially at the Casino Theatre, along with Lillian Russell and Elizabeth Urquhart.

== Henry G. Hilton and death ==
In the late 1880s, Gerrish became involved with Henry G. Hilton, the son of a former Judge, Henry Hilton, who had at one time accumulated a considerable fortune as the lawyer and an heir of tycoon A. T. Stewart. Hilton was married at the time of their affair and was disinherited after refusing his father's demand to break it off. Hilton's father died in 1899, and, according to Gerrish, they married shortly after the death of his wife two years later. By the time of his death in 1905, at the age of 49, what money he had obtained in a lawsuit against his father’s estate was virtually gone. What remained was the Hilton mansion on Sedgwick Avenue in Brooklyn, New York.

Gerrish spent the last months of her life deep in debt, in a mansion badly in need of repair, surrounded by servants and guard dogs to shield her from the daily horde of creditors and process servers gathered at her gates. Once in February 1906, she managed to slip out to visit friends and in her haste to return home, fell on some ice and broke her ankle. Friends were able to get her to a doctor and back home before word of the incident leaked out.

She died there on December 8, 1906. The New York Times suggested that her dire living conditions may have been a factor in her death at the age of 46. Gerrish’s remains were interred at the Fresh Pond Necropolis in Queens, New York.
