= The Black Hussar =

The Black Hussar may refer to:

- The Black Hussar (1932 film), a 1932 German historical drama film
- The Black Hussar (1915 film), a 1915 German silent film
- The Black Hussar (operetta), the English language title for the 1884 opera Der Feldprediger by Carl Millöcker
