= Alice Oates =

American actress

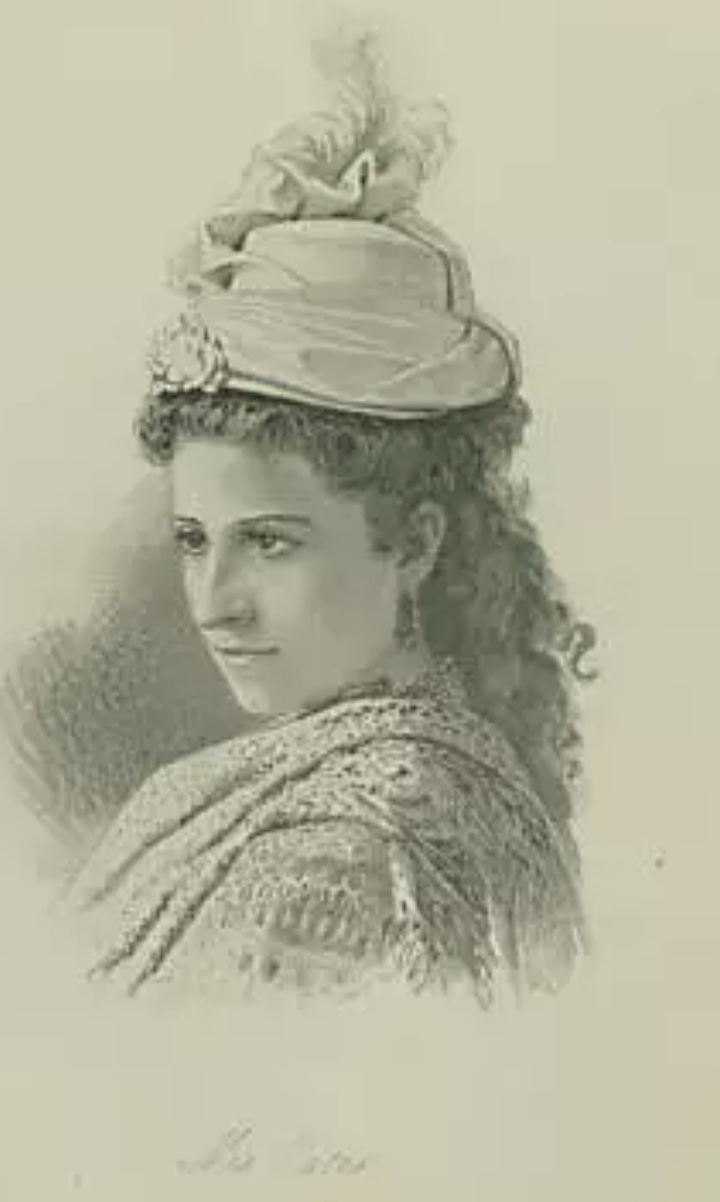
Alice Oates in 1875

Alice Oates (22 September 1849 – 10 January 1887) was an actress, theatre manager and pioneer of American musical theatre who took opéra bouffe in English to all corners of America. She produced the first performance of a work by Gilbert and Sullivan in America with her unauthorised Trial by Jury in 1875, the first American production of The Sultan of Mocha (1878) and an early performance of H.M.S. Pinafore (1878).

== Early career ==
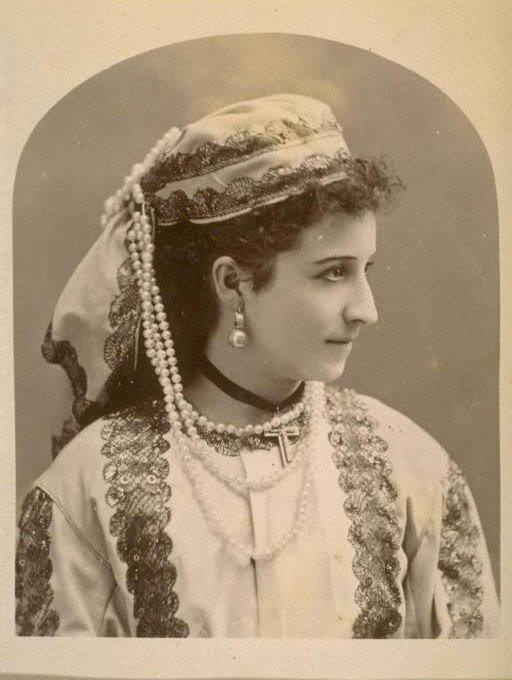
Alice Oates in 1878 at the time of her management of the Bush Street Theatre

Born as Alice Merritt in Nashville in Tennessee, she was educated at a Catholic seminary in Kentucky before studying singing in Louisville and New Orleans intending to follow a career in opera. Aged about 15 she married James A. Oates, the stage-manager at the Adelphi Theater in Nashville under Augusta Dargon, and made her first appearance on the stage in his benefit as Paul in The Pet of the Petticoats. While still making occasional concert appearances under the name of ‘Mdlle Orsini’, she began working alongside her husband as a soubrette in shows in Nashville (1867), then in Cincinnati, Chicago and Saint Paul in Minnesota (where her husband took a theatre).

As Oates's confidence as a performer grew so her rôles became more important. She played Idex in Undine, Fianetta in The White Fawn, Darnley in The Field of the Cloth of Gold and Abdallah in The Female Forty Thieves. In 1868 she founded her ‘Mrs James A Oates’ Burlesque Troupe’. This company she toured the burlesques The Field of the Cloth of Gold, Rip van Winkle and Pocahontas around America in 1869.

In May 1870 Oates made her way to the Olympic Theatre in New York to play Broadway for the first time as Little Graceful in The Fair One in the Golden Wig; Josephine in a burlesque of the old musical drama The Daughter of the Regiment, or the 800 Fathers (in theory a version of Donizetti's opera La fille du régiment but actually including music from other composers including Offenbach and Verdi); and The Field of the Cloth of Gold. She returned to the Olympic in August 1870 with her first attempt at opéra-bouffe, a seriously botched version of London's already pretty botched version of Hervé’s Little Faust (playing both Méphisto and the Street Arab) which met with little favour but which was probably the first American production of that work. In 1873 Oates sang in Prima Donna for a Night, a reworked version of Offenbach's one act Monsieur Choufleuri.

== Actor-manager ==
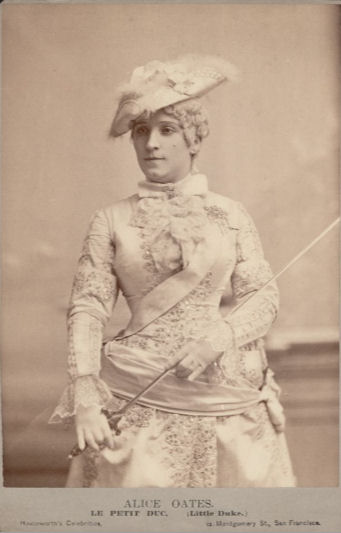
in Le petit duc (c1878)

After witnessing the success of Lydia Thompson and her English musical burlesques Oates decided to follow suit by organising a burlesque company of her own which made successful tours for several seasons. This burlesque company became the Alice Oates New English Opera Company which presented French opéra bouffe in English. She and her company appeared at Macauley's Theatre in Kentucky four times between 1876 and 1879.

As public taste changed so Oates varied her bill. She was the first manager to produce a Gilbert and Sullivan work in America when she staged "a rather approximate" Trial By Jury at the Arch Street Theatre in Philadelphia in 1875. She produced the first American performance of Alfred Cellier's The Sultan of Mocha in December 1878 at the Bush Street Theater in San Francisco, California, but realising the popularity of H.M.S. Pinafore she took off Sultan and quickly mounted a production of Pinafore before it had even been produced in New York. Her production opened in San Francisco on 23 December 1878 and ran until 2 January 1879 with Oates playing in travesti as Ralph Rackstraw. However, Gilbert would not have recognised his words nor Sullivan his music in this production which received her Little Faust treatment and in which Oates sang the song "Good-by, Sweetheart" while other songs unconnected with the authorised Pinafore were similarly performed by the cast. The production was "cobbled together" by James A. Meade (who played Dick Deadeye) from the recollections of one person who had seen the original production in London and another who had played in the orchestra in the recent Boston production. Added to this the piece was an English satire about the Royal Navy resulting in the show not being a hit with San Francisco audiences.

Within a few years Oates had changed her repertoire of old-style British burlesques for the latest French fashion in musical-theatre, becoming one of the most successful theatre managers to produce and play English-language opéra bouffe and opéra comique around America. Her Little Faust style of staging, however, remained her manner throughout. The pieces were heavily altered, with changes to score, comedy, and programmes, until they resembled far more the old English burlesques Oates had dropped from her repertoire than the very much more sophisticated French variety.

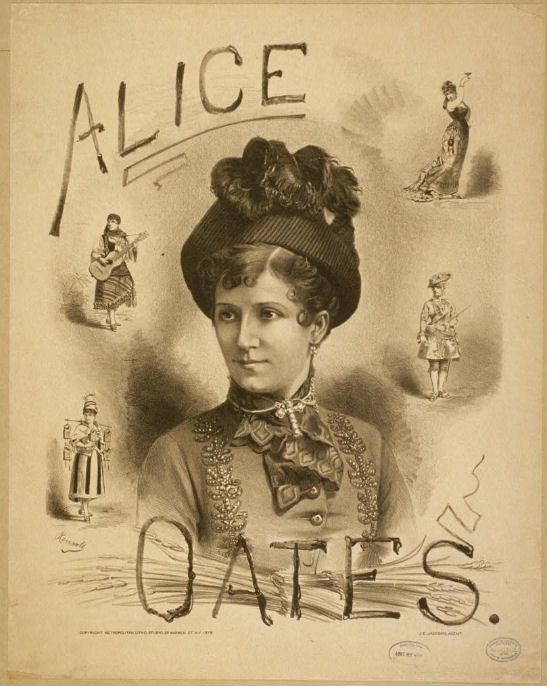
Poster advertising Alice Oates and her theatrical company (c1879)

She and her company toured throughout America, playing venues large and small, becoming a feature of the country's touring circuits. She made only rare appearances on Broadway with her adaptations which included Giroflé-Girofla, Le petit duc, La fille de Madame Angot, La jolie parfumeuse, Les bavards, La princesse de Trébizonde and La Grande-Duchesse de Gérolstein, treating New York by and large as just another, and usually rather brief, tour date. City audiences found her style and her adaptations too broad - too obvious and too ‘provincial'. They preferred such works not to be broadly peppered with music hall songs or minstrel sketches, but nevertheless she maintained a decade-long and unbroken popularity with her own audiences west of the Mississippi for many years until the early 1880s when her career began first to waver and then to wilt.

In March 1880 Oates appeared in Giroflé-Girofla at Hooley's Theatre in Chicago while in December 1880 she was in Richard Genée's Fanchette (Der Seekadett) at the Grand Opera House in Cincinnati. Gradually Alice Oates faded away into playing variety, burlesque and extravaganza with her name attached to often poor and ill-managed companies which all too often were stranded or broke up on the road. She continued to manage her company until the mid-1880s, in 1884 renaming it the 'Alice Oates Superb Burlesque Company' and by 1885 it was described as a "third-rate company" that performed "in low variety theaters where... the demimonde reside."

Alice Oates and her theatrical company never left American although on several occasions it was announced that she and her troupe would embark on a tour of Australia, but this never came to fruition. When in the 1870s Emily Soldene began touring with her own more legitimate productions of opéra bouffe in English Oates found herself gradually squeezed off the tour circuits.

== Legacy ==
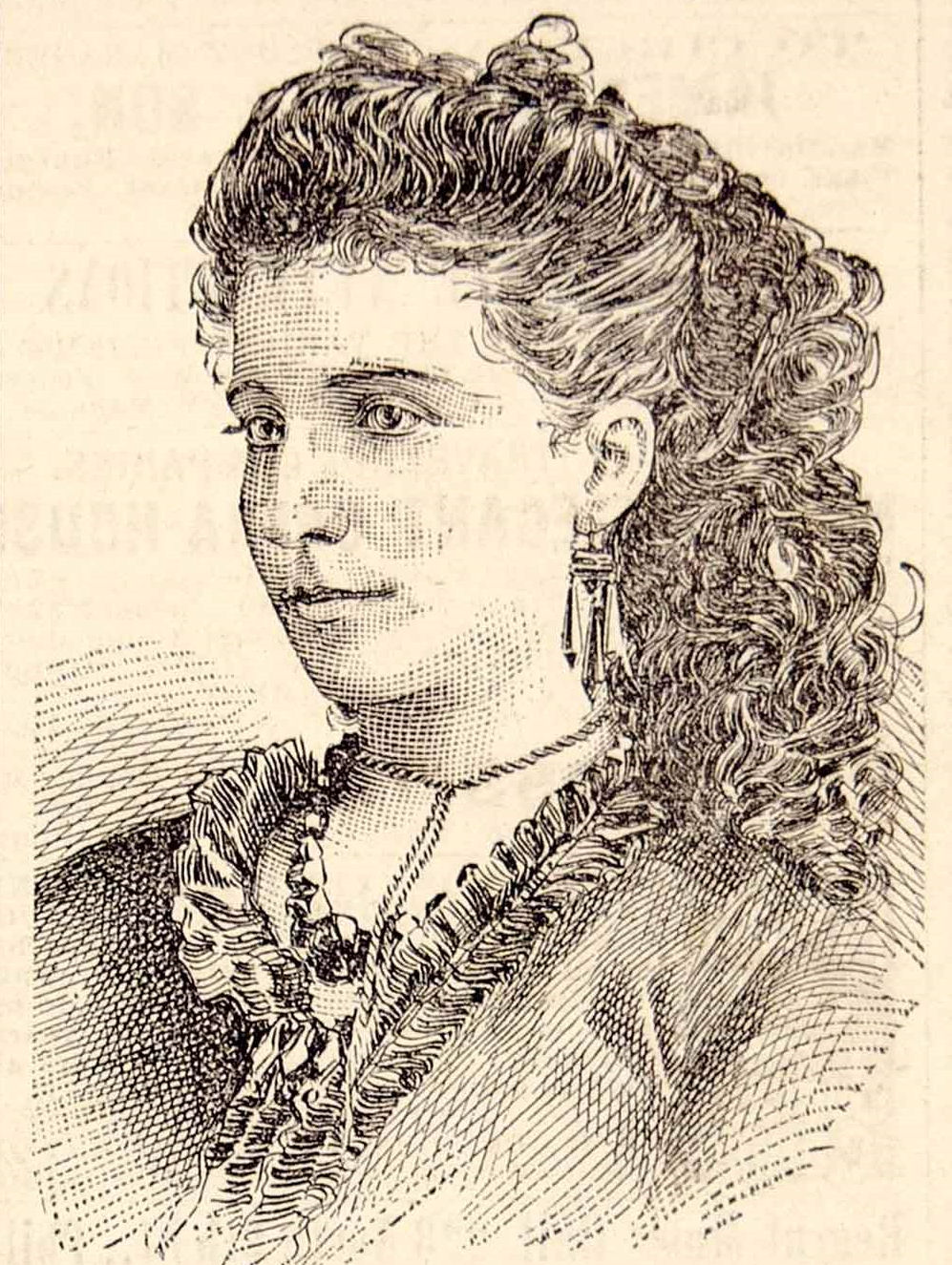
Portrait of Oates from an 1887 obituary

Apart from being the first theatrical manager in America to stage a work by Gilbert and Sullivan - her unauthorised production of Trial by Jury in 1875 - Alice Oates gave early employment to many who went on to become important in American musical theatre, including Evangeline librettist J. Cheever Goodwin who acted in her company and translated French operas bouffes into English for her, and the actress Pauline Hall who later was to find success in Erminie. She employed a number of well-known performers of the English musical stage including Alfred William Maflin and produced an original comic opera Mignonette by Blanche Reeves and Jesse Williams which played at Ford's Grand Opera House in Baltimore in October 1874.

After the death of her husband in 1871 she married her agent, Tracy W Titus in 1872, but they separated in 1875 and divorced later that year. Her subsequent series of amorous adventures became a running newspaper feature until she married Samuel P. Watkins in 1879, who had no connection with the theatrical profession but who after became her business manager.

A contemporary summed up her appeal in her heyday: ‘She offers a kind of compromise between the downright deviltry of Aimée and the mild indelicacy of other opéra-bouffe artists. Never insipid, never outrageous, she gravitates nicely between high opera and low comedy, never approaching close enough to either to attract largely’.

Alice Oates died in January 1887 aged 37 at the home of her father-in-law in Philadelphia after catching a cold in a damp dressing room in a theatre in Saint Paul, Minnesota.
