= Kate Jepson =

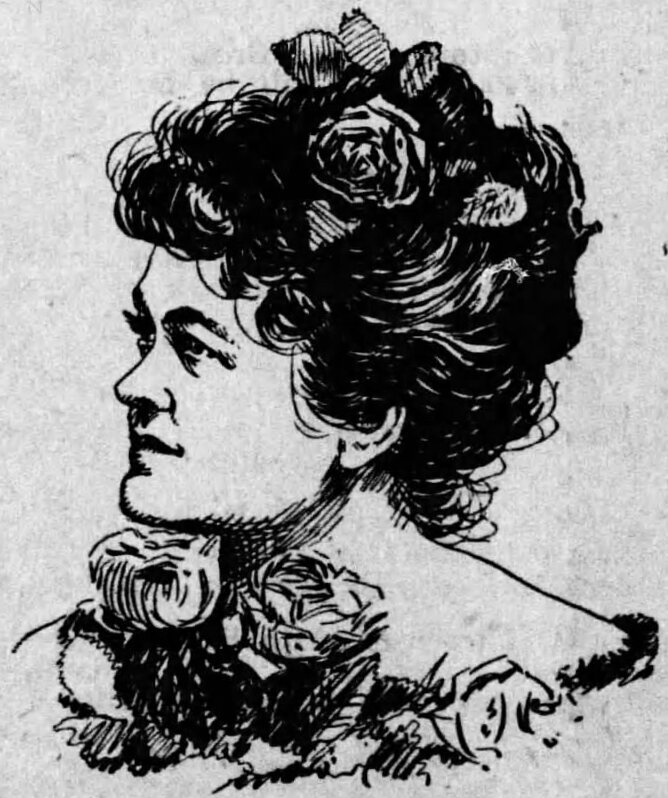
- Born: July 7, 1860; Clinton, New Jersey, U.S.
- Died: September 27, 1923 (aged 63); Philadelphia, Pennsylvania, U.S.
- Occupation: Actress

Kate Jepson (July 7, 1860 – September 27, 1923) was an American actress. She had a forty year stage career and starred in some silent movies. She is perhaps best known for her lead role as Mrs. Pipp in The Education of Mr. Pipp (1914).

Kate Jepson was born in 1860 in Clinton, New Jersey. On stage she performed with touring companies and appeared in Broadway productions, including Mary, Mary, Quite Contrary (1905–1906) at the Garrick Theatre, In the Bishop's Carriage (1907) at the Grand Opera House, What Happened to Mary (1913) at the Fulton Theatre, Children of Earth (1915) at the Booth Theatre, and Moonlight Mary at the Fulton. On screen, she was largely a character actor, portraying Digby Bell's wife in The Education of Mr. Pipp, Eugene O'Brien's aunt in Just Out of College (1915), and George Le Guere's mother in The Turmoil (1916).

Kate Jepson died on September 27, 1923 at the Episcopal Hospital in Philadelphia.

== Filmography ==
- The Education of Mr. Pipp (1914)
- Just Out of College (1915)
- The Turmoil (1916)
- The Rathskeller and the Rose (1918)
