= Rose Beaudet =

American actress and opera singer

- Beaudet c.1890
- Born: Eliza Lang; 1862; Stockton, California, U.S.
- Died: 1947
- Resting place: Stockton Rural Cemetery, California U.S.
- Occupation(s): Actress, opera singer
- Spouse: S. Arlant Edwards (m. 1891; div. 1902)

Rose Beaudet (born Eliza Lang; 1862–1947) was an American actress and opera singer of the late 19th and early 20th century who regularly appeared in musical theatre.

She was born as Eliza Lang, the daughter of Councilman Lewis H. Lang of Stockton near San Francisco, and his wife Mary Ann Lang. She married S. Arlant Edwards on 15 January 1891, but had divorced him by 1902. She appeared with the C. D. Willard Company in 1903.

A mezzo-soprano, Beaudet's appearances on Broadway included Eva in The Beggar Student at the Casino Theatre (1883 - 1884), Amorita at the Casino Theatre (1885), Captain Delauney in Erminie at the Casino Theatre (1886), a role played in the original London production by Kate Everleigh, The Kitchen Belle (1889), Mrs St Mirim in Miss Innocence Abroad at the Bijou Theatre (1894), Catherine in Lost, Strayed or Stolen at the Fifth Avenue Theatre (1896), All on Account of Eliza at the Garrick Theatre and Wallack's Theatre (1900 - 1901), The Cardinal at the Garden Theatre (1902), Mrs Jefferson Briscoe in The County Chairman at Wallack's Theatre (1903 - 1904), Marcie Brook in Miss Jack at the Herald Square Theatre (1911), and Mrs Kennion in The Younger Generation and in Half an Hour at the Lyceum Theatre (1913).
