= Laura Joyce Bell =

English-American actress and singer

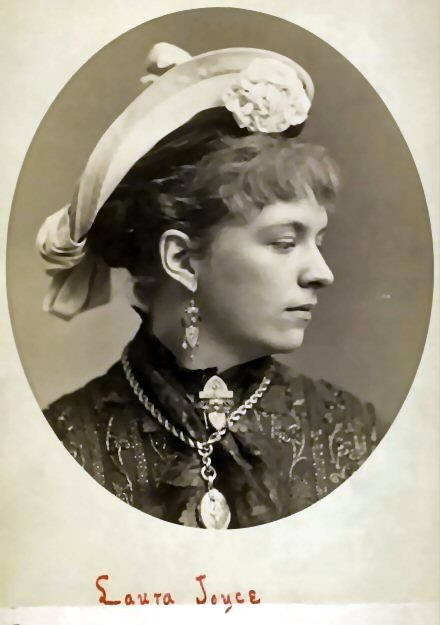
- Born: Laura Joyce Maskell; 6 May 1854; London, England
- Died: 30 May 1904 (aged 50); New York City, U.S.
- Burial place: Woodlawn Cemetery
- Occupations: Actress, singer
- Spouses: James Valentine Taylor (m. 1874; div. 1878) Digby Valentine Bell (m. 1883)
- Children: 3

Laura Joyce Bell (née Maskell; 6 May 1854 – 30 May 1904) was an English-American actress and contralto singer mostly associated with Edwardian musical comedy and light opera.

After beginning her career as Laura Joyce in concerts and theatre in Britain, she moved to the United States in 1872 where she earned good notices in the spectacular shows at Niblo's Garden. With a success in the title role of Evangeline (1875), a season in East coast cities with John T. Ford, and seasons at Daly's Broadway Theatre and the Bijou Opera House, among others, her career was established. She married the American comedian Digby Bell, with whom she frequently appeared with over the last two decades of her career. The two appeared extensively with the McCaull Comic Opera Company in Gilbert and Sullivan, Offenbach and many other comic operas. Throughout her career, she also appeared in comic plays and dramas.

== Early life and career ==
Bell was born in London, the daughter of Maria Dalton Dauncey, a dramatic elocutionist and voice teacher (died 1917), and James Henry Maskell (1824–1897), a sometime theatrical agent and merchant. She was coached in acting by her mother and attended the London Academy of Music, studying music with Francesco Schira. In 1870, as an amateur, she appeared at the Royal Strand Theatre as Gertrude in a production of James Planché's Loan of a Lover. From this early period until 1883, Bell appeared as Laura Joyce in London in a comic opera titled Mina and played the Count of Flanders in Cupid 'Mid the Roses and The Ring and the Keeper by John Pratt Wooler. She soon participated in a British tour of a sketch presentation called Happy Hours of Fanciful Fun by Frank Green and Alfred Lee, which was followed by a season at the Theatre Royal, Manchester and an engagement with Dion Boucicault as a soubrette singer at Covent Garden. At Christmas 1871, she played Oberon in the prologue to The Children in the Wood at the Theatre Royal, Drury Lane, and the following year she toured with Howard Paul.

== American career ==
=== 1872 to 1882 ===
Bell was sent by her agent, Richard D'Oyly Carte, to New York in 1872 to appear at Niblo's Garden in its spectacular extravaganzas, earning good notices in Leo and Lotos, and as Lisette in the pantomime Azreal and Mary in The Beats of New York. In January 1874, Bell married James Valentine Taylor (1843–1882), a Boston architect and later theatre manager from a rich family. The two met when Taylor was the manager at Niblo's Theatre and married over the objections of her father. A son was born that November, followed by a second son, and by the summer of 1877 Bell accused her husband of physical abuse and habitual drunkenness. The divorce was granted in June 1878 after generating numerous headlines in the press.

She made a hit in the title role of Evangeline at the old Boston Globe Theatre in 1875 and reprised the following season at the Boston Museum. In between, at Christmas 1875, she starred at the Boston Globe as Prince Amabel in Turko the Terrible, then appeared in concert with the Berger Family and Jules Levy. She next played Polly Eccles in Caste and appeared in Our Boys with the New England Comedy Company. She reprised her role in Evangeline in Philadelphia, where she was engaged by John T. Ford to play in a six-month touring season in cities along the East coast: Miss Hardcastle She Stoops to Conquer, Lady Wagstaff in The Pink Dominos, Miss Zulu in Forbidden Fruit, Lydia Languish in The Rivals and a role in Camille. She then returned to Boston to reprise Evangeline. In November 1878, she was Germaine in Les Cloches de Corneville.

Bell played Buttercup in H. M. S. Pinafore in 1879 with the Grand English Opera Company at Haverly's Lyceum Theatre in New York and also played the role elsewhere. She also played the title role in Fatinitza, Lady Allcash in Fra Diavolo, Lange in La fille de Madame Angot and a role in the American musical The First Lifeguards in Brighton. In early 1880, she was engaged by the D’Oyly Carte Opera Company to play Ruth in The Pirates of Penzance in Chicago. Later that year she joined the company at Daly's Broadway Theatre where, for more than a year she played in the Edgar Fawcett musical comedy Our First Families, as Hebe Josselyn; in the title role of the musical comedy, Zanina, taken from Nisida by Richard Genée; Silena in Needles and Pins; Gabrielle Prince in Quits; Georgette in Royal Youth; Merope Mallow in Cinderella at School, a long running musical comedy by Woolson Morse from the Thomas William Robertson play School; and Leonora in Fawcett's comedy Americans Abroad.

=== 1882–1903 ===
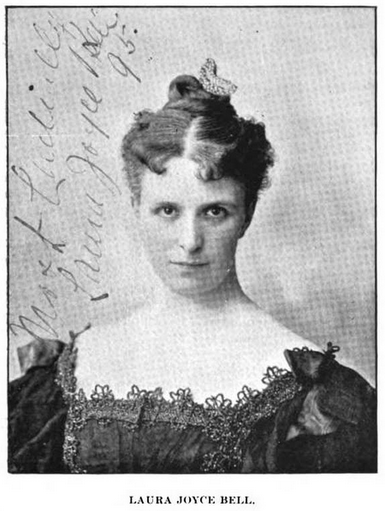
Laura Joyce Bell, c. 1895

She next signed with the Bijou Opera House where, from June 1882, Bell played Lady Jane in the Gilbert and Sullivan opera Patience, which featured Digby Bell as Archibald Grosvenor. In October she appeared with Bell as Lady Sangazure in The Sorcerer (Lillian Russell played Aline). In January 1883, she sang the role of Mrs. Cowslip at the Bijou in the Solomon and Stephens opera, Virginia. In March 1883, she married Digby Bell. The same year, she was with the McCaull Comic Opera Company at the Casino Theatre performing Manola in an English adaptation of Offenbach's La princesse de Trébizonde, and that November, with Rice's Opera Bouffe Company, she appeared at the Bijou as Diana, then Juno, in Orpheus and Eurydice, Max Freeman's adaptation of Offenbach's Orphée aux enfers. Other roles during this period included Bathilde in Olivette, Donna Scolastica in Heart and Hand, Lady Clare in Nell Gwynne.

From October 1884 Bell was engaged at the Casino as Palmatica in a revival of The Beggar Student, by Carl Millöcker. The following March at the Casino, Bell was Ruth to her husband's Sergeant of Police in The Pirates of Penzance, and to positive reviews in the spring of 1886 Bell and her husband toured with McCaull's company in an English-language version of Millöcker's comic opera The Black Hussars (Der schwarze Husar). Later in 1886 the two toured with the same company in Don Caesar, possibly from Boucicault's play Don Caesar de Bazan; or, Love and Honor, and The Crowing Hen, from Edmond Audran's Le Serment d'Amour. Bell continued to tour with McCaull for many years, often with her husband.

In 1886 she played Lady Prue, with her husband as Matt o' the Mill, in McCaull's presentation at the Star Theatre of Audran's Indiana and Tronda in a successful English adaptation of Von Suppé's The Bellman. She was Katisha opposite her husband's Ko-Ko in an April 1890 Broadway Theatre revival of The Mikado, and in April 1897 played the strong-willed mother-in law of Dr. Willow (Digby Bell) in Thomas's play The Hoosier Doctor.

In 1903, she was with her husband as Mrs Bardell and Sam Weller in the long run of Mr. Pickwick (from the Charles Dickens novel, The Pickwick Papers) at the Herald Square Theatre (also starring De Wolf Hopper) and later the Grand Opera House.

== Personal life and death ==
With Taylor, Bell had two sons, Valentine and Herbert. The first, Valentine Taylor (7 November 1874 – 3 May 1943), was a Harvard-educated lawyer who served as an assistant New York Attorney General, law secretary to several New York appellate judges and as council to New York governors William Sulzer and Martin H. Glynn.

She married Digby Bell a day or two after he had received his divorce from Lillian Brooks. Since Brooks had accused the couple of infidelity, a charge that was denied by both and never proven, the divorce decree forbade the two from marrying in New York. They wed in Pennsylvania and used a similar case involving a divorced New York judge as precedence for their marriage to be recognised in New York State. The couple had a daughter, Mrs. Harry C. Schlichting.

Bell died in 1904 at the age of 50 of heart disease at the couple's residence on Lexington Avenue, New York City. She is buried at Woodlawn Cemetery in Bronx, New York. Digby Bell and her mother, Maria Maskell, both died in 1917.
