= E. Ernst =

E. Ernst may refer to:

- Edzard Ernst, modern-day Professor of Complementary Medicine
- Emil Ernst, 20th-century German astronomer
