= Father and the Boys =

1915 film

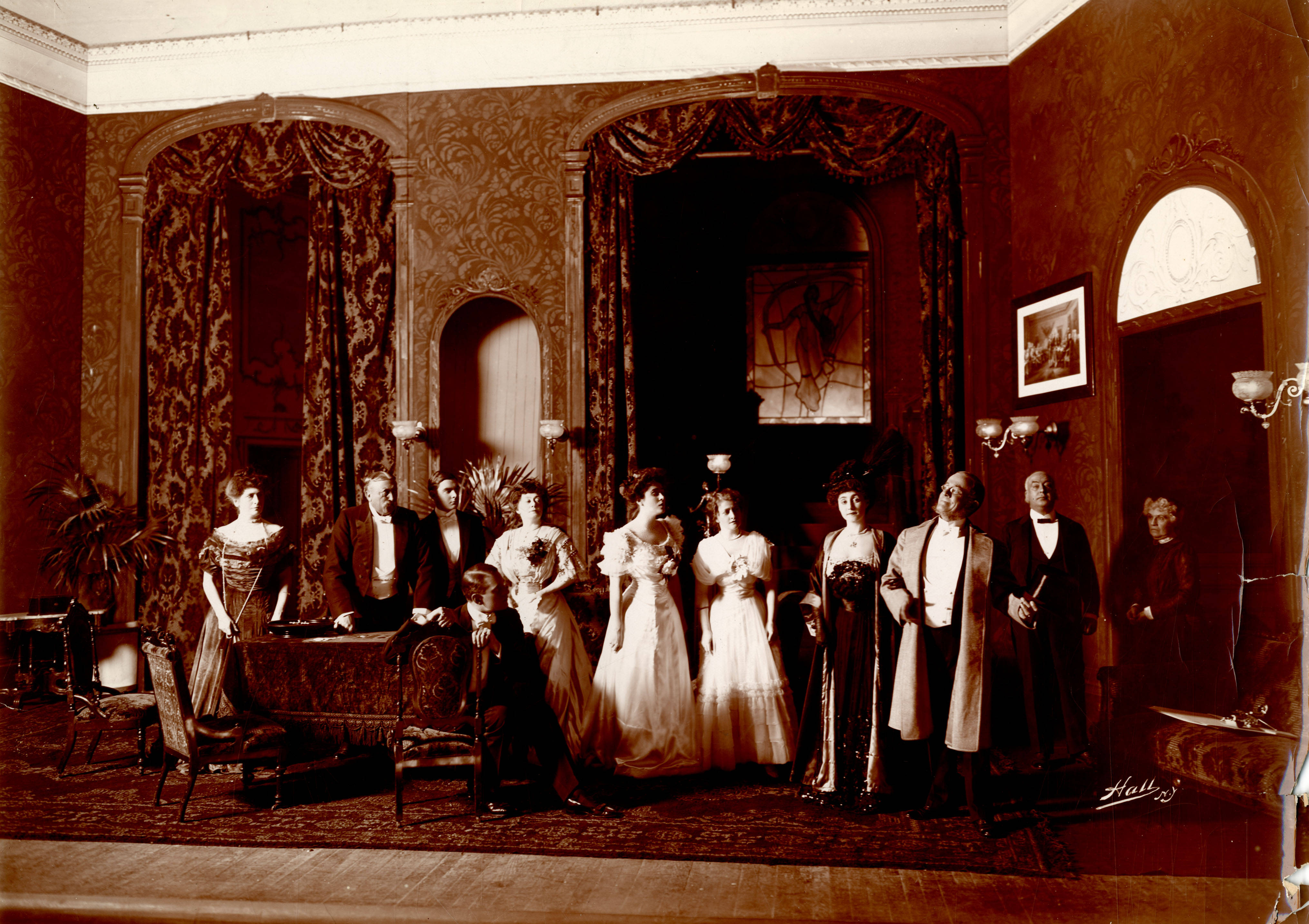
- A scene from Father and the Boys
- Directed by: Joe De Grasse
- Written by: Ida May Park
- Based on: Father and the Boys by George Ade (play)
- Produced by: Broadway Films Co.
- Starring: Digby Bell; Louise Lovely; Lon Chaney
- Cinematography: Edward Ullman
- Production company: Universal Film Manufacturing Company
- Distributed by: Universal Film Manufacturing Company
- Release date: December 20, 1915
- Running time: 5 reels (50 minutes)
- Country: United States
- Language: Silent (English intertitles)

Father and the Boys is a 1915 American silent comedy film directed by Joe De Grasse, written by Ida May Park, and co-starring Lon Chaney and Digby Bell. It is based on a popular 1908 Broadway play produced by Charles Frohman, called Father and the Boys by George Ade. This was Louise Lovely's American film debut after emigrating from Australia. She made a total of 8 films with Chaney during this time period.

Digby Bell reprised his Broadway role as Lemuel Morewood in the film (this was his first film role). Louise Lovely's role of Bessie Brayton was played by Margaret Dale in the play. The makeup-savvy Bell befriended Chaney on the set of this film and the two were seen trading makeup tips behind the scenes.

After Richelieu (1914), this was Lon Chaney's 2nd appearance in a full-length feature film, running approximately 50 minutes, much longer than the shorts he had been appearing in for Universal. A still exists which shows Chaney in the role of Tuck Bartholomew. The film is today considered to be lost.

== Plot ==
Lemuel Morewood is a wealthy businessman who hopes someday to see his two sons take over his business. He wants Tom to marry Frances Berkeley and Billy to marry Emily Donelson, but the boys have different plans. Tom is just interested in sports, while Billy is obsessed with high society matters and spends all his time with Mrs. Guilford, the leader of the smart set.

Bessie Brayton is an orphan from Nevada who comes to New York and gets a job as an entertainer at high society parties. She owns a half-interest in the Bluebird Mine, which she believes is worthless. The Morewoods hire Bessie one night to entertain at a party where she meets Major Didsworth, who offers to sell her mine shares for her. Bessie taunts Lemuel that he is old-fashioned, so he gets into his tuxedo, wins a large sum of money gambling with Didsworth, and goes off with Bessie to blow his cash. Lemuel keeps up his wild pace; he goes to the racetrack where his wild behavior infuriates Mrs. Guilford, and she criticizes Lemuel's behavior. Billy defends his father, ending his friendship with Mrs. Guilford.

Bessie receives a telegram from Didsworth offering her $1,000 cash in exchange for her mine stock. Lemuel suspects that she is being cheated, and he goes back to Nevada with her. The boys think their father has run off to elope with Bessie and they follow them, along with Emily, Frances, and Tobias Ford, the family lawyer. Out in Nevada, Lemuel and Bessie learn that her half of the mine is actually worth a fortune, and they learn that the other half is owned by Tuck Bartholomew, Bessie's old sweetheart who disappeared years ago up in Alaska.

On route to Nevada, Tom becomes engaged to Emily and Billy becomes engaged to Frances—exactly the opposite of what their father had planned for the boys. They arrive at a wedding ceremony just in time to stop their father from marrying Bessie, only to learn that Bessie is actually marrying her old flame Tuck Bartholomew, who has come back from Alaska. Lemuel and his two sons return home to New York to run the family business, together with Emily and Frances.

== Cast ==
- Digby Bell as Lemuel Morewood
- Louise Lovely as Bessie Brayton (credited as Louise Carbasse)
- Harry Ham as Billy Morewood
- Colin Chase as Tom Morewood
- Yona Landowska as Emily Donelson
- Mae Gaston as Frances Berkeley
- Lon Chaney as Tuck Bartholomew
- Hayward Mack as Major Didsworth
- Harry Davenport as Tobias Ford, the lawyer (credited as H. Davenport)
- Tom Chatterton
- Doc Crane

== Reception ==
"George Ade's comedy is pleasant, genuine and funny. The dialogue being absent, it is not such a sidesplitting affair as it was several years ago on the stage, but it is a lively comedy. An excellent five-reel comedy....Digby Bell, ther? veteran character actor is seen in the leading part. He is supported by a good cast.... A very pleasing comedy number." --- Motion Picture News

"Ida May Park, the scenario writer, and Joseph De Grasse, director, are to be congratulated on getting this comedy over without either padding or loss of action. It runs smoothly and clearly from scene to scene and preserves the undercurrent of genial humor throughout. The supporting cast is very pleasing." --- Moving Picture World
