= Pauline Hall =

American actress

- Born: Pauline Fredrika Schmidgall; February 26, 1860; Cincinnati, Ohio
- Died: December 29, 1919 (aged 59); Yonkers, New York
- Occupation: Actress
- Years active: 1875–1919
- Spouse(s): Edward R. White (div.); George B. McClellan, Jr. (div.)

Pauline Hall (born Pauline Fredrika Schmidgall; February 26, 1860 – December 29, 1919) was an American stage actress and singer.

== Biography ==
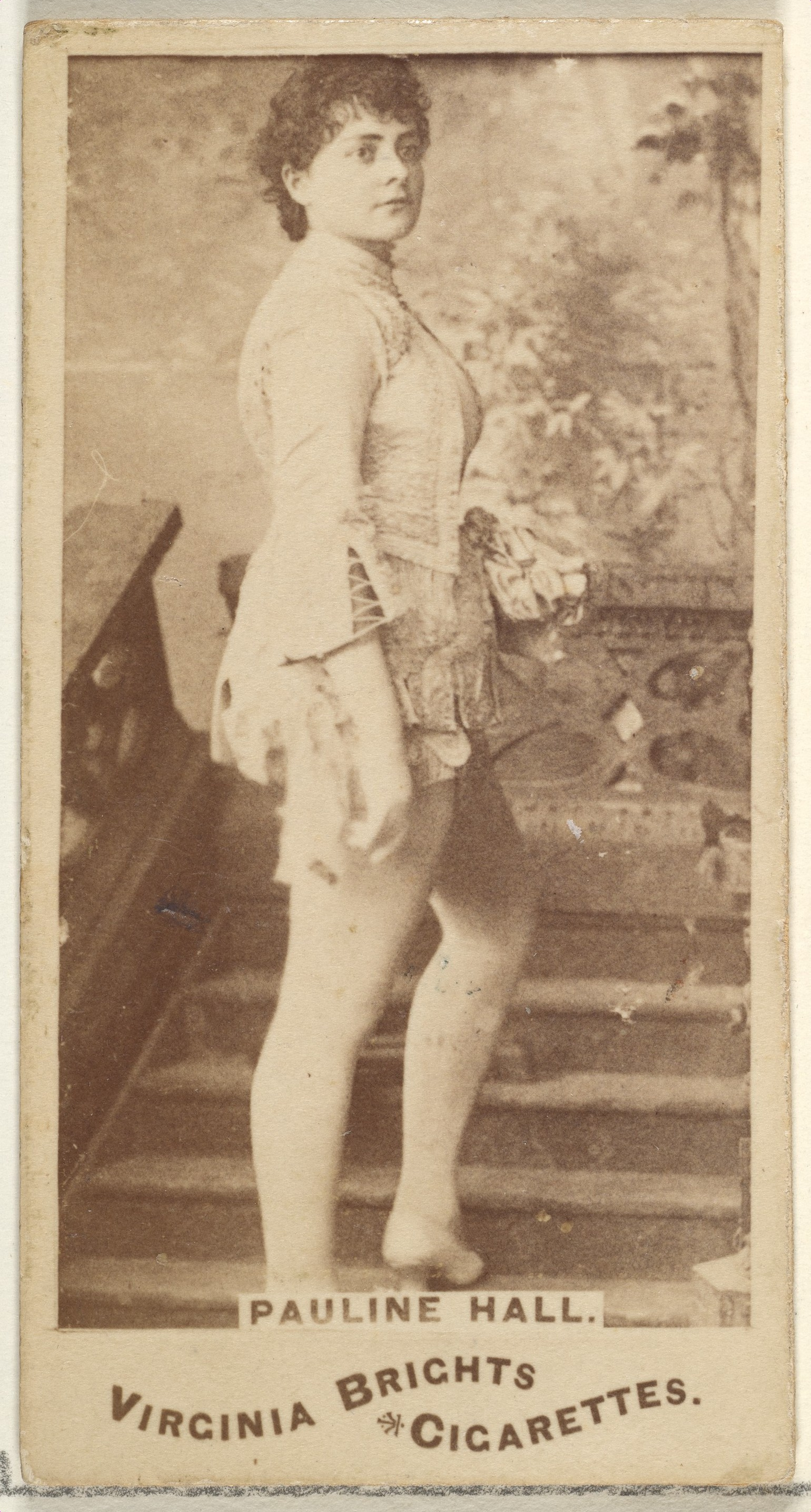
Pauline Hall, ca. 1888, Burdick Collection, Metropolitan Museum of Art

One of the most popular turn-of-the-twentieth-century light opera prima donnas in America, Hall left school at the age of 14 and began her career as a dancer in her native Cincinnati, Ohio, in 1875. Shortly thereafter, Hall joined the Alice Oates Opera Company, leaving it to spend time touring in straight plays with Mary Anderson. By 1880 she was working for Edward E. Rice, who cast her in several of his musical productions, giving her, among others, the trouser role of the hero Gabriel in a revival that year of Evangeline.

Hall continued to be a favorite in comic and light operas around the country until 1890. However, her greatest success came when she played the title role in the first American production of Erminie (1886–1888). She performed Erminie a record-breaking 800 times while on Broadway and touring around the United States, which made her a household name. Hall toured with her own companies from 1890 to 1896, and later entered vaudeville, reportedly earning as much as $600 a week by 1898. In all, she played in over two dozen Broadway operettas. She appeared in revivals of Robin Hood and The Geisha in 1912 and 1913 and in Ziegfeld productions near the end of her career.

Although popular as an actress and singer, Hall was never given good notices by reviewers, who thought she was mediocre. She had an alluring figure, however, and she maintained it until her death in 1919 while playing in David Belasco's The Gold Diggers.

Hall was married to Edward White from 1881 to 1889. She was then married to theatrical manager George B. McLellan (brother of playwright C. M. S. McLellan), from 1894 to 1902; she had a daughter by him in 1895.

Hall died of bronchial pneumonia, at the age of 59, in Yonkers, New York.
