= The Education of Mr. Pipp =

- Directed by: William F. Haddock
- Written by: Augustus Thomas; Charles Dana Gibson
- Produced by: All Star Feature Corporation
- Starring: Digby Bell
- Distributed by: Alco Film Corporation
- Release date: November 23, 1914
- Running time: 5 reels
- Country: USA
- Language: Silent..(English titles)

The Education of Mr. Pipp is a lost 1914 silent film comedy based on the play by Augustus Thomas and Charles Dana Gibson. It starred stage actor Digby Bell recreating his role from the play.

== Cast ==
- Digby Bell - Mr. Pipp
- Kate Jepson - Mrs. Pipp
- Belle Daube - Ida Pipp
- Edna Mae Wilson - Julia Pipp (*as Edna Brun)
- Henry Driscole - Count Charmount
- George Irving - John Willing
- Stanley Dark - Dix de la Touraine
- Harry Blakemore - Baron Haussling (H. D. Blakemore)
- Mona Ryan - Lady Fitzmaurice
- Frank Patton - Lord Herbert Fitzmaurice
- William A. Evans - Prefect of Police
