= The Black Hussar (operetta) =

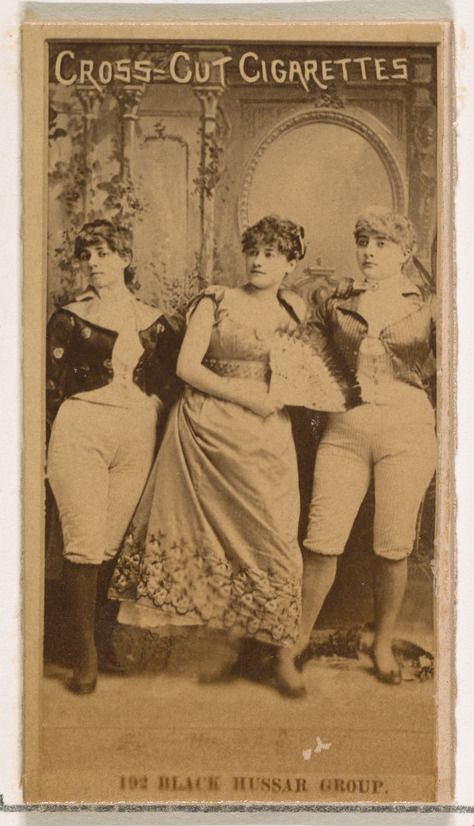
1880s actors card advertising cigarettes. Pictured are members of the McCaull Opera Comique Company in their costumes for The Black Hussar.

The Black Hussar is a comic opera in three acts with music by Carl Millöcker. The original work, entitled Der Feldprediger (English: The Army Chaplain), used a German-language libretto by Hugo Wittmann and Alois Wohlmuth that was adapted from Gustav Schilling's Das seltsame Brautgemach. It premiered in Vienna in October 31, 1884. It was only a modest success in Austria. The operetta achieved greater acclaim in the United States in a highly successful English-language adaption by the playwright Sydney Rosenfeld entitled The Black Hussar. This version of Millöcker's comic opera was first performed at Wallack's Theatre on Broadway in 1885 where it had a successful run. The work was subsequently revived on Broadway in 1887 and 1900, and was also performed widely by other American opera troupes during the late 19th and early 20th centuries.

== Roles ==
Roles, voice types, premiere cast
Role	Original Broadway cast Conductor: A. DeNovelis
Friedrich von Helbert	Mark Smith
Hans von Waldmann	Edwin W. Hoff
Theophil Hackenback	DeWolf Hopper
Piffkow	Digby Bell
Mefflin	A. W. Maflin
François Thorilliere	Jay Taylor
Rubke	J. A. Furen
Wutki	A. Barbara
Minna	Lilly Post
Rosetta	Marie Jansen
Barbara	Mathilde Cottrelly
Shadow	Charles O'Neil
Bruck	A. D. Barker
Eiken	Frank Howard
Selchow	L. C. Shrader
Prittwitz	H. W. Frazer
Putnam	Henry Platte

== Plot ==
The Black Hussars takes place during the French invasion of Russia in 1812 by Napoleon and his army. The story takes place in a small country town of Trautenfeld in Prussia, a county allied to Russia, which a French regiment has recently captured after overthrowing the Russian soldiers stationed there. Using the disguise of army chaplain, the town is infiltrated by Von Helbert, an officer of the Black Hussars, who seeks to instigate an insurrection. Von Helbert's efforts to induce an uprising in the town are impeded by Hackenback, the town magistrate, whose skilled diplomacy advocates for maintaining good and neutral relations with both the Russians and French. The daughters of the magistrate, Minna and Rosetta, become love interests of Von Helbert and his sidekick Waldermann.

Aware that a spy is working against them, the French seek to find Von Helbert, but are unsure what he looks like. Von Helbert feeds them a description of the man which matches the physical likeness of magistrate Hackenback. This leads to Hackenback being interrogated and arrested by the French. With Von Helbert's lead an insurrection arises at the time that the Black Hussars invade the occupied town and the French are overthrown.

== History ==
Der Feldprediger premiered in Vienna at the Theater an der Wien on 31 October 1884.

The McCaull Opera Comique Company (MOCO) performed the work at Wallack's Theatre for the opera's first staging on Broadway where it opened on May 4, 1885. That production used an English language adaptation of Wittmann and Wohlmuth's libretto that was written by the playwright Sydney Rosenfeld. It was revived by MOCO at Wallack's in 1887. The Castle Square Opera Company performed a Broadway revival of the opera in 1900 at the American Theatre.
