= 705 Erminia =

Main-belt asteroid

- Animation of 705 Erminia's orbit 2000–2020; Sun Earth · Mars · Jupiter · 705 Erminia

Discovery
- Discovered by: E. Ernst
- Discovery site: Heidelberg Obs.
- Discovery date: 6 October 1910

Designations
- Pronunciation: /ərˈmɪniə/
- Alternative designations: 1910 KV

Orbital characteristics
- Epoch 31 July 2016 (JD 2457600.5)
- Uncertainty parameter 0
- Observation arc: 105.53 yr (38544 d)
- Aphelion: 3.0635189 AU (458.29590 Gm)
- Perihelion: 2.7809463 AU (416.02365 Gm)
- Semi-major axis: 2.92223259 AU (437.159773 Gm)
- Eccentricity: 0.04834875
- Orbital period (sidereal): 5.00 yr (1824.6 d)
- Mean anomaly: 348.73426°
- Mean motion: 0° 11^{m} 50.288^{s} / day
- Inclination: 25.045517°
- Longitude of ascending node: 2.8949214°
- Argument of perihelion: 101.35517°

Physical characteristics
- Dimensions: 128 km × 141 km (occultation)
- Mean diameter: 132.261±1.178 km 70–130 km (assumed albedo=0.05–0.3); 134.22 ±2.3 (IRAS); 133.9–134.5 (albedo estimate)
- Mass: (4.12 ± 1.775/0.942)×10^{18} kg (2.23±0.79)×10^{18} kg (Note: Calculated from its standard gravitational parameter GM = 0.149±0.053 km^{3}/s^{2}.)
- Mean density: 3.401 ± 1.465/0.778 g/cm^{3} 1.84 g/cm^{3} (Note: Assuming a diameter of 132 km.)
- Synodic rotation period: 53.96 h (2.248 d)
- Geometric albedo: 0.031±0.005
- Spectral type: X (tholen) C (SMASSII); B-V = 0.667–0.725; U-B = 0.249–0.327
- Absolute magnitude (H): 8.51

705 Erminia is a minor planet orbiting the Sun. Its name derives from the comic opera Erminie. An occultation on 8 December 2014 gave 3 chords, with one measurement suggesting a small moon 6–10 kilometers wide at a distance of 400 kilometers to the primary.

== See also ==
- List of Solar System objects by size
