= Wildfire (1915 film) =

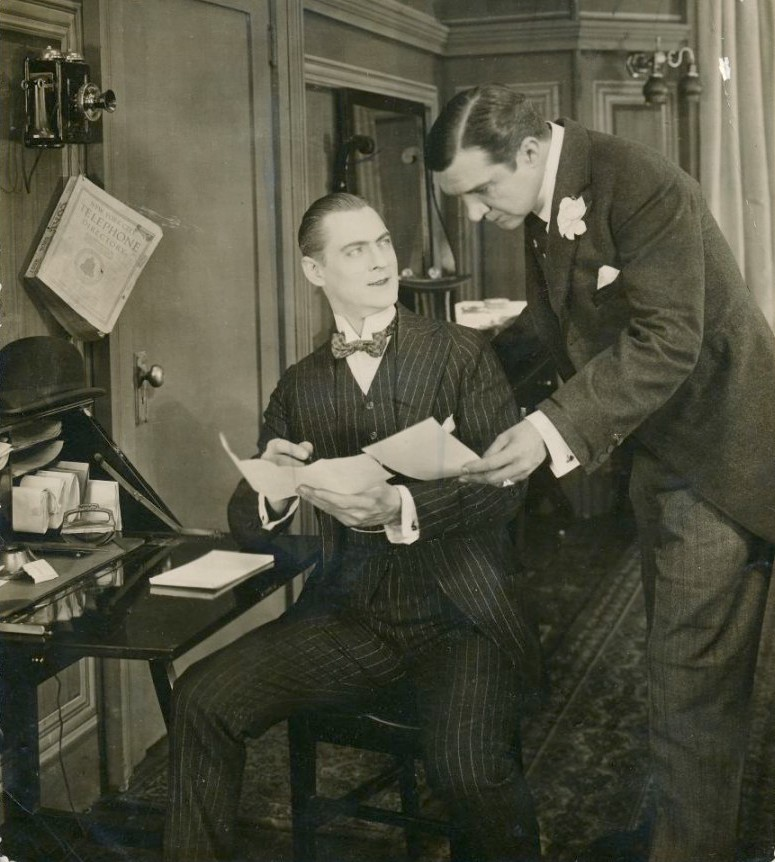
- Lionel Barrymore in a sequence from the film
- Directed by: Edwin Middleton
- Based on: Wildfire by George Broadhurst and George V. Hobart
- Produced by: Shubert family William A. Brady
- Starring: Lillian Russell; Lionel Barrymore
- Cinematography: Sol Polito
- Distributed by: World Film Company
- Release date: January 25, 1915
- Running time: 5 reels
- Country: United States
- Languages: Silent film English intertitles

Wildfire is a 1915 silent drama film produced by the Shuberts and distributed by World Pictures. It is based on the 1908 Broadway play Wildfire by George V. Hobart and George Broadhurst. The play had starred the famous Lillian Russell, who, in a rare screen appearance, reprised her role here. It was remade in 1925 with Aileen Pringle. Surviving prints are missing the third reel and the ending. Prints and/or fragments were found in the Dawson Film Find in 1978.

According to the American Film Institute catalog, this film was shot at the Peerless Studios. About 30% of the scenes were filmed in Charleston, South Carolina and at the nearby Palmetto Park race course.

== Plot ==
John Keefe, a gambler, shoots and kills Robert Barrington in an argument over a card game. Keefe steals Barrington's papers and forges a bill of sale to himself for Barrington's stable of race horses back east. The stable includes the prize filly, Wildfire. Meanwhile, Barrington's daughters, Henrietta and Myrtle, are becoming worried about their father's long absence in the West. John Garrison, the sheriff of the town in which Barrington was killed, goes East to investigate. He suspects Keefe (now called John Duffy) and begins to build a case, causing Henrietta to become suspicious. Keefe, realizing that the game is almost up, tries to get Wildfire's jockey to throw the big race, but Henrietta saves the day and Wildfire wins.

== Cast ==
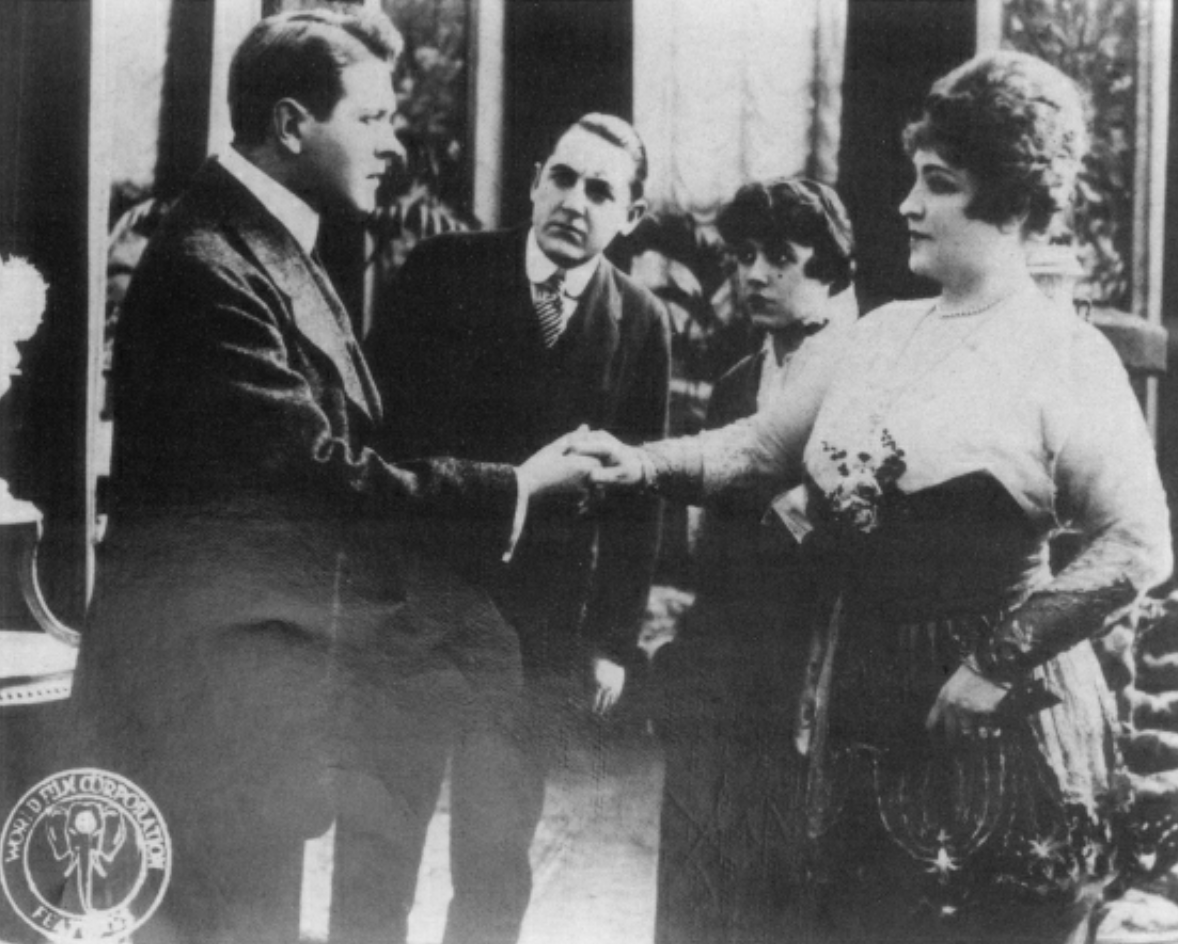
Lillian Russell in a Wildfire scene

- Lillian Russell - Henrietta Barrington
- Leone Morgan - Myrtle Barrington, her sister
- Richard Morris - Robert W. Barrington
- W. H. Powers - Ralph Woodhurst
- Lionel Barrymore - John Keefe, gambler
- Glenn White - Sheriff John Garrison
- Riley Hatch - Matt Donovan (as William Riley Hatch)
- George Mack - Bud
- Walter Kendig - Marty Green
- James J. Gorman - Gorman
- William C. Chamberlain - Walker
- Ruby Rose - Betty
- James Jeffrey - Chappy Raster

== See also ==
- List of films about horses
- List of films about horse racing
