= The Turmoil (1916 film) =

1916 film by Edgar Jones

- Directed by: Edgar Jones
- Based on: The Turmoil by Booth Tarkington
- Starring: Valli Valli
- Production company: Columbia Pictures Corporation
- Distributed by: Metro Pictures
- Release date: January 10, 1916
- Running time: 5 reels
- Country: United States
- Language: Silent (English intertitles)

The Turmoil is a 1916 American silent drama film based on a novel by Booth Tarkington. It was released by Metro Pictures and stars stage actress Valli Valli.

This film has been preserved by MGM.

== Cast ==
- Valli Valli – Mary Vertrees
- George LeGuere – Bibbs Sheridan
- Charles Prince – James Sheridan, Sr.
- Florida Kingsley – Mrs. Vertrees
- Frank DeVernon – Mr. Vertrees
- Kate Jepson – Mrs. James Sheridan
- Ferdinand Tidmarsh – James Sheridan, Jr.
- Robert Stowe Gill – Roscoe Sheridan
- Ilean Hume – Edith Sheridan
- Frederic Sumner – Robert Lamhorn
- William Anker – Dr. George Gurney

unbilled

- Peggy Hopkins Joyce – Unhappy Wife
