= McCaull Comic Opera Company =

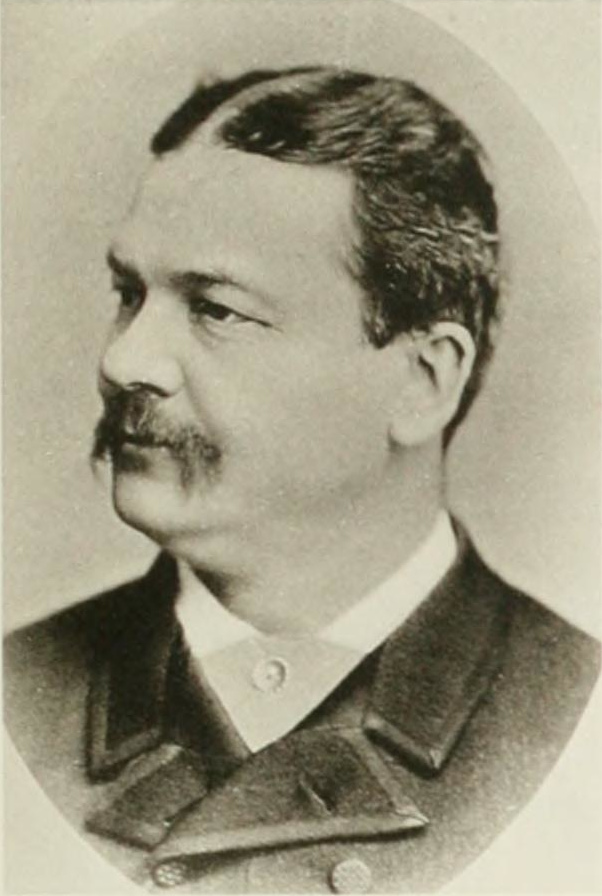
John A. McCaull

The McCaull Comic Opera Company, also called the McCaull Opera Comique Company, was an American theatral production company founded by Colonel John A. McCaull in 1880. The company produced operetta, comic opera and musical theatre in New York City and on tour in the eastern and midwestern U.S. and Canada until McCaull's death in 1894. It nurtured such stars, in their early careers, as Lillian Russell and DeWolf Hopper.

== History ==
=== Early years ===
McCaull (1846–1894) was born in Scotland. He served as a colonel in the Confederate Army and later became a lawyer in Baltimore. He was representing John T. Ford, lessee of the Fifth Avenue Theatre in New York, when Gilbert and Sullivan presented H.M.S. Pinafore in December 1879 and premiered The Pirates of Penzance at the end of that month. McCaull was attracted to theatrical production and became involved as an investor with these productions. He then quit his law practice to produce light opera. For the Christmas season in 1880, he staged Olivette at the Bijou Theatre in New York. The strong success of this piece encouraged him to continue to present comic opera.

McCaull explained the goals of his opera company to The New York Times: "The public demands good voices. .... Our aim is to build up this thing until we get something like the Opéra comique in Paris". McCaull invested $10,000 in Rudolph Aronson's newly rebuilt Casino Theatre in New York in 1882. He opened the theatre the same year with the American premiere of the Strauss operetta The Queen's Lace Handkerchief. Also there, the company produced Prince Methusalem (1883), Der Bettelstudent (1883–84), Falka (1884), Nell Gwynne (with a new libretto), Die Fledermaus (1885), Apajune, the Water Nymph (1885) and The Black Hussar (1885). The success of The Black Hussar led to an extended run. After this, McCaull quarrelled with the Aronsons and was forced out of the theatre, so the company became exclusively a touring company. The company returned to Broadway, however, for summer seasons at Wallack's Theatre.

The company appeared in Denver, Colorado, in 1883, again playing The Queen's Lace Handkerchief. The review in the Rocky Mountain News praised the cast and stated that "in musical and dramatic ability and magnificent costuming, the McCaull opera company is the best that has ever visited Denver. The scenery is very pretty and appropriate, the chorus well trained and well dressed." By 1885, McCaull had three companies on tour almost continually. He told The New York Times: "Two of these companies play 40 weeks in the year. The other plays 52 weeks. ... [T]here are 1,300 people who receive their direct support in connection with my companies." The performers included Frederick Leslie, Eugène Oudin, Digby Bell, Lillian Russell, Frank Daniels, Francis Wilson, May Yohé and DeWolf Hopper. In 1890 in Kansas City and Denver, the company produced The Black Hussar and Von Suppe's opera Clover, "which was given to a crowded and appreciative house. It was exceedingly well put on and was fully enjoyed, applause being continued and frequent. The chorus work was excellent, and the work of the principals left nothing to be desired."

=== Later years ===
Late in 1888 in Chicago, McCaull fell on ice, receiving a deep cut on his head. This caused a brain injury that led to paralysis of the muscles of his throat and right side. For about a year afterwards, he continued to direct the company, although his speech was so difficult to understand that he eventually had to give up directing. The De Wolf Hopper Opera Company was then formed with some of McCaull's singers. Francis Wilson also formed his own opera company. By 1890, there were rumors that McCaull's company would disband. By 1891, McCaull had sold his properties and rights to perform works to Harry Askin. But McCaull and his wife sued Askin for not paying the full amount. McCaull continued to control his companies, using hired managers, nearly until his death in 1894.

Biographer Johnson Briscoe remarked: "Col. John A. McCaull was one of the greatest light opera's impresarios that this country has ever known, and the McCaull Opera Company was a truly wonderful organization, the like of which we shall probably never know again."
