= The Black Hussar (1915 film) =

1915 film

- German: Der schwarze Husar
- Directed by: Harry Piel
- Written by: Harry Piel
- Cinematography: Georg Schubert
- Release date: March 1915
- Country: Germany
- Languages: Silent; German intertitles

The Black Hussar (German: Der schwarze Husar) is a 1915 German silent film directed by Harry Piel.

== Cast ==
- Fritz Schroeter
- Carl Heinz Wolff
