= Digby Bell =

American actor and vaudeville entertainer

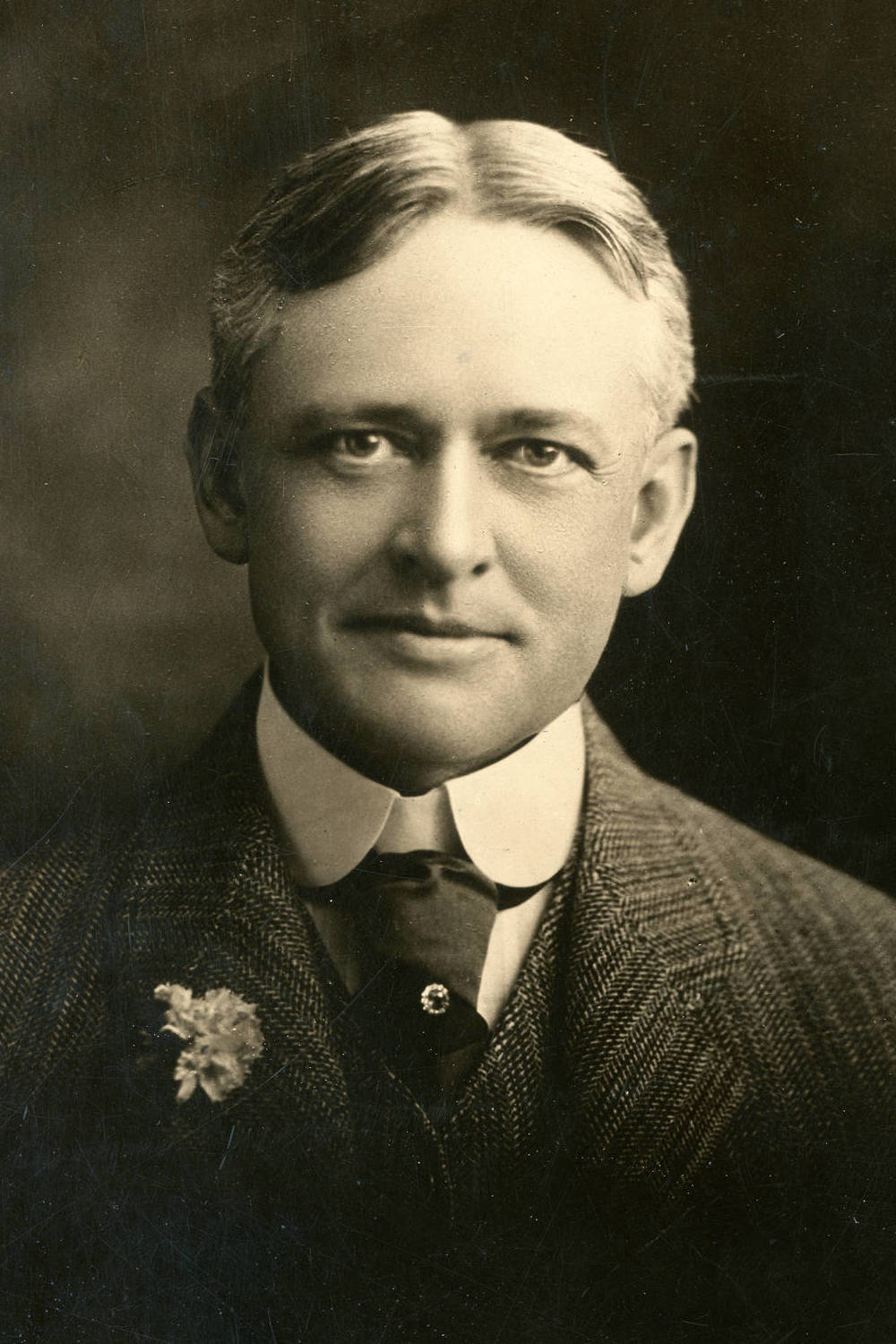
- Bell c. 1906
- Born: Digby Valentine Bell; November 8, 1849; Milwaukee, Wisconsin, U.S.
- Died: June 20, 1917 (aged 67); New York City, U.S.
- Occupations: Vaudeville entertainer and Broadway performer
- Spouse(s): Lillian Brooks (divorced, 1883) Laura Joyce Bell (m. 1883; died 1904)

Digby Bell (born Digby Valentine Bell; November 8, 1849 – June 20, 1917) was a popular vaudeville entertainer and Broadway performer at the beginning of the 20th century.

== Early life ==
Bell was born in Milwaukee, Wisconsin on November 8, 1849.

== Performing career ==
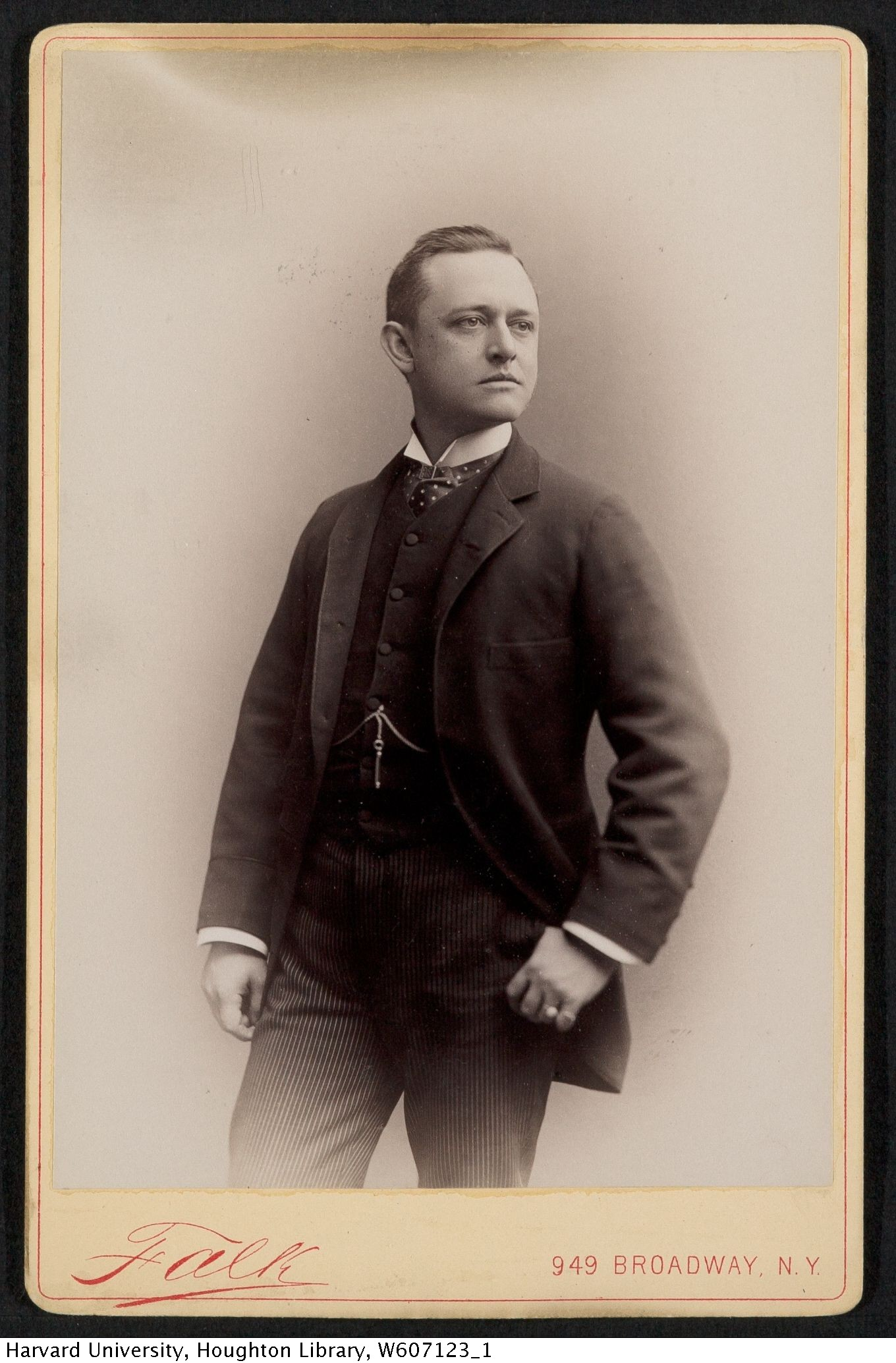
Bell featured on cabinet card, c. 1885

Bell studied in Europe to become a concert singer, and became famous for his roles in comic musical productions, such as Gilbert and Sullivan comic operas and with the McCaull Comic Opera Company. His first starring role was in the musical Jupiter in 1892. He appeared many times with Lillian Russell in shows such as Princess Nicotine, The Queen of Brilliants and The Grand Duchess of Gerolstein. He introduced the song '"The Man Who Broke the Bank at Monte Carlo".

Bell gave a concert at Chickering Hall in New York City on April 26, 1878, that was favorably reviewed by the New York Times.

Much of Bell's later career was in nonmusical plays or vaudeville.

=== Notable stage appearances ===
Broadway appearances

- The Begum, Sep 21, 1887 - Dec 10, 1887, role - Myhnt-Jhuleep
- The Hoosier Doctor, Apr 18, 1898 - [unknown], role - Dr. Willow
- Mr. Pickwick, Jan 19, 1903 - May 1903, role - Sam Weller
- The Education of Mr. Pipp, Feb 20, 1905 - Apr 1905, role - J. Wesley Pipp
- An International Marriage, Jan 4, 1909 - Jan 1909
- The Debtors, Oct 12, 1909 - Oct 1909, role - William Dorritt
- The Yeomen of the Guard, Apr 19, 1915 - May 8, 1915, role - Chorus
- The Sorcerer, May 24, 1915 - Jun 5, 1915, role - Dr. Daly

=== Film appearances ===
- The Education of Mr. Pipp (1914)
- Father and the Boys (1915)

=== Partial discography ===
1909

- The Tough Boy on the Right Field Fence
- The Blind Boy in the Gallery
- The Man Who Fanned Casey (A reply to 'Casey at the Bat'.)
- Experiences of a Commuter
- Day and Knight
- A Discontented Egg

== Personal life ==
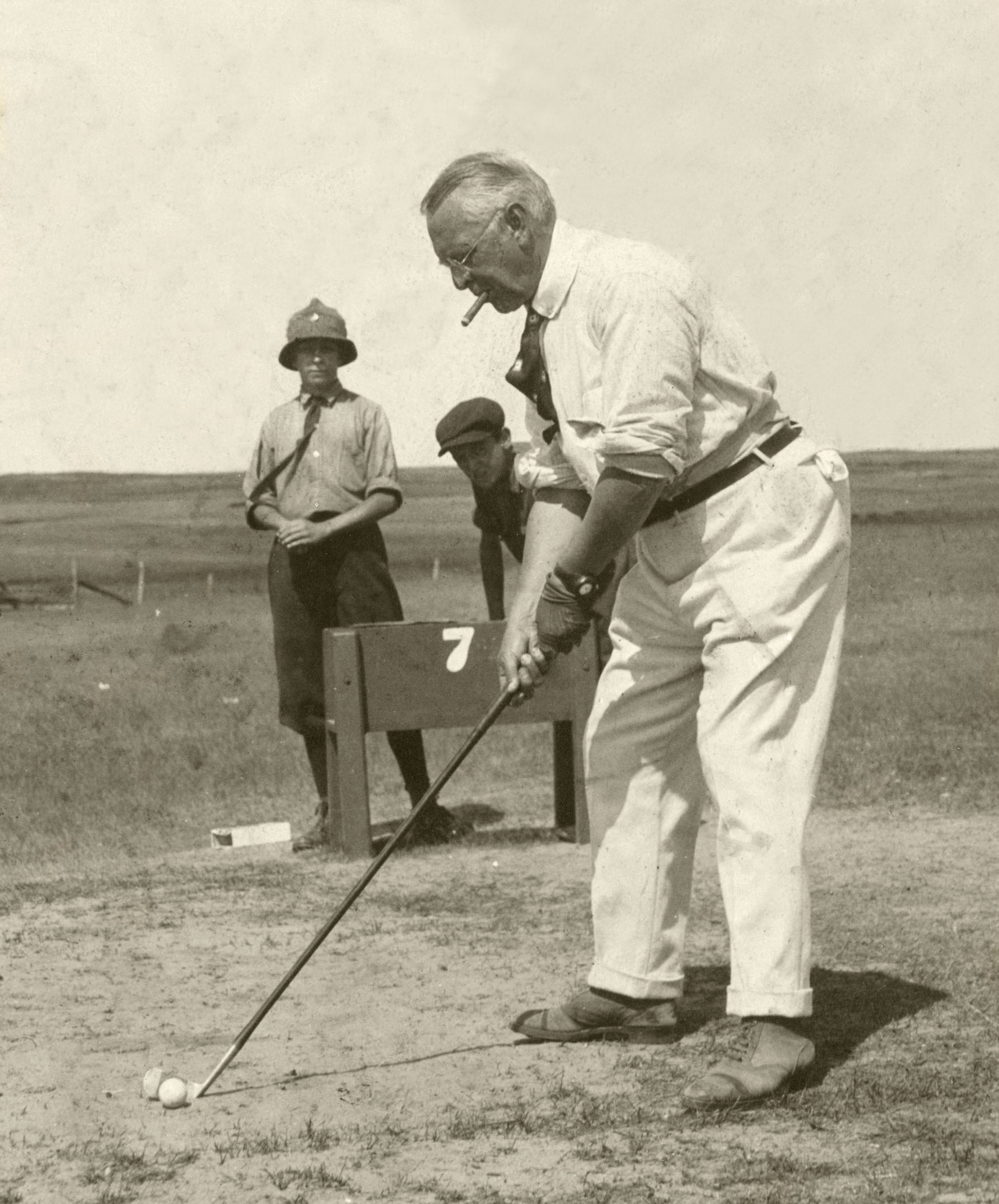
Bell playing golf in Siasconset, Massachusetts, c. 1911

Bell was married at least twice. His first wife, Lillian Brooks, divorced him in March 1883. He married his second wife, Laura Joyce Bell (née Hannah Joyce Maskell), a day or so after his divorce from Brooks was finalized. Laura Joyce Bell died in New York in 1904.

Bell was a fervent golfer and New York Giants baseball fan, as was his best friend and frequent co-star DeWolf Hopper.

== Death ==
Bell died on June 20, 1917, in New York City.

== Filmography ==
- The Education of Mr. Pipp (1914)
- Father and the Boys (1915)
