= Edward Jakobowski =

English composer

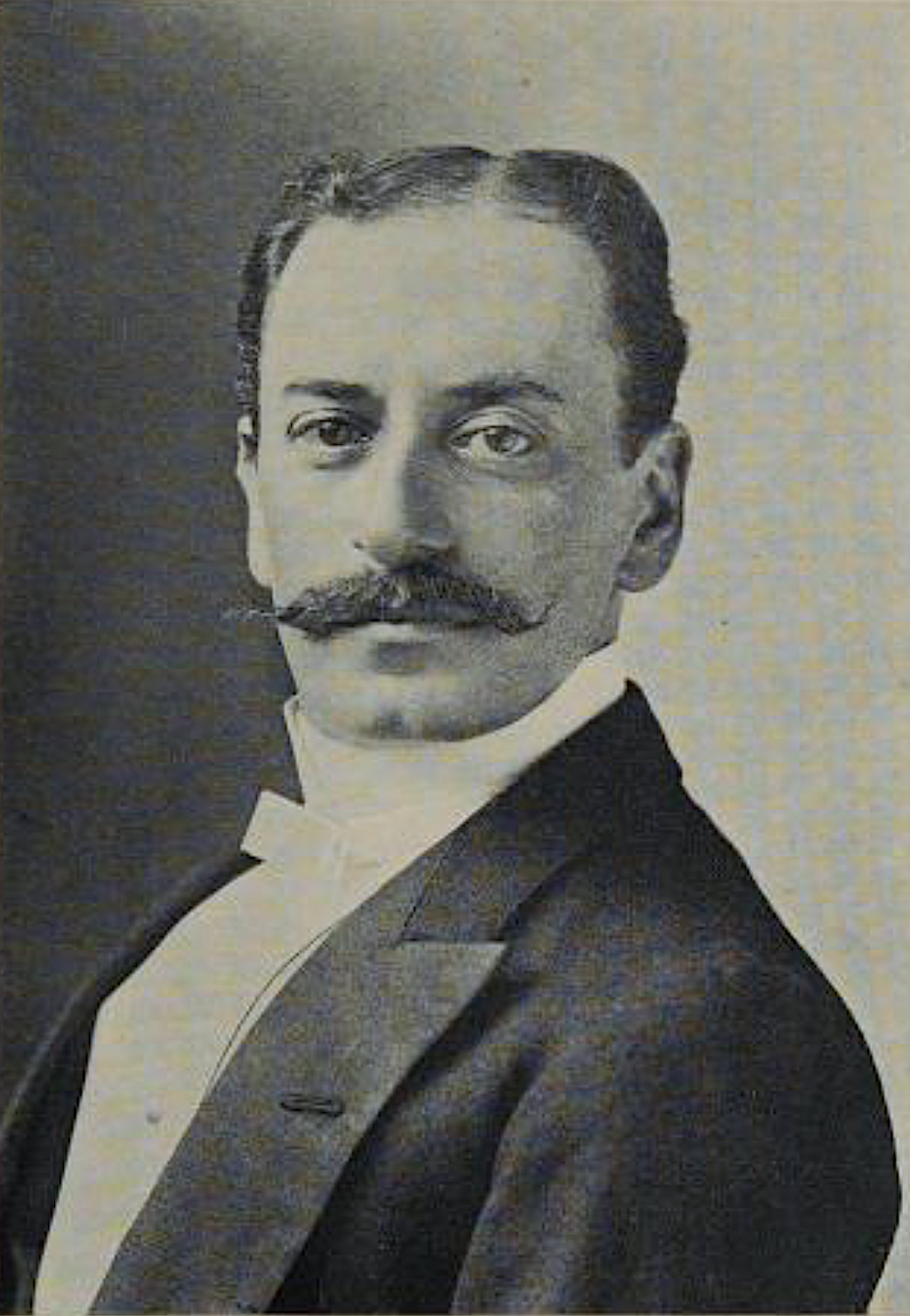
Edward Jakobowski

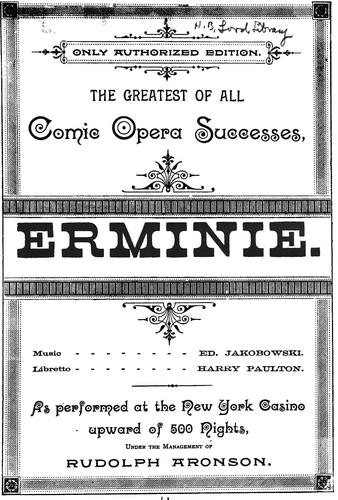
Cover of Jakobowski's Erminie – New York (1887)

Edward Jakobowski (17 April 1856 – 29 April 1929) was an English composer, especially of musical theatre, best known for writing the hit comic opera Erminie.

== Life and career ==
Jakobowski was born in Islington, London, the only son of Israel Jakobowski (born c. 1819), a salesman dealing in stationery and cigars, and his wife Fanny (born c. 1834), who were both Viennese of Polish extraction. He had an older sister, Helena (born c. 1855). At age six, he moved to Vienna, Austria, where he lived for some 15 years and was given a musical education. In the late 1870s he lived in Paris for three years. In 1881, he returned to London.

Jakobowski's most successful work by far, Erminie, opened in 1885 in London. It was revived extensively and toured internationally, playing with extraordinary success on Broadway from 1886. None of his other works had more than a short run or two, although many of them toured profitably. For two Victorian burlesques, The Three Beggars (1883) and Little Carmen (1884), Jakobowski used the pen name Edward Belville. His principal shows were Dick (1884, based on the story of Dick Whittington; libretto: Alfred Murray), Erminie (1885), The Palace of Pearl (1886), Mynheer Jan (1887; libretto: Harry Paulton), Paola (1889; libretto: Paulton), La Rosiére (1893, in one act), The Queen of Brilliants (1894; libretto: Brandon Thomas, starring Lillian Russell), The Devil's Deputy (1894; libretto: J. Cheever Goodwin), Milord Sir Smith (1898, originally titled Cumpano; libretto O'Day and Adrian Ross), Tarantella (1899; libretto: Alfred Murray) and Winsome Winnie (1903). He was one of eight composers who contributed to Pat in 1892. Two short operettas in 1893 with libretti by B. C. Stephenson, The Improvisatore and A Venetian Singer, made little impact.

Jakobowski was married twice, the second time in New York in 1895 to Clara Brown, which ended in a London divorce in 1901. In 1902, he was declared bankrupt with debts of £1,090 (£115,834 in 2025 adjusted for inflation).

He died at the Infirmary, Friern Barnet, north London, in 1929. His estate was valued at 47 pounds, 8 shillings.
