= Emil Ernst =

German astronomer (1889–1942)

Asteroids discovered: 1
705 Erminia	October 6, 1910	MPC

Emil Ernst (6 June 1889– 26 June 1942) was a German astronomer and discoverer of a minor planet.

He did his PhD dissertation in 1918 at the Landessternwarte Heidelberg-Königstuhl (Heidelberg Observatory) at the Ruprecht Karl University of Heidelberg in southern Germany.

At the time, the observatory at Heidelberg was a center for asteroid discovery under the direction of Max Wolf. During his time there, Ernst discovered the main-belt asteroid 705 Erminia.
