= Kate Everleigh =

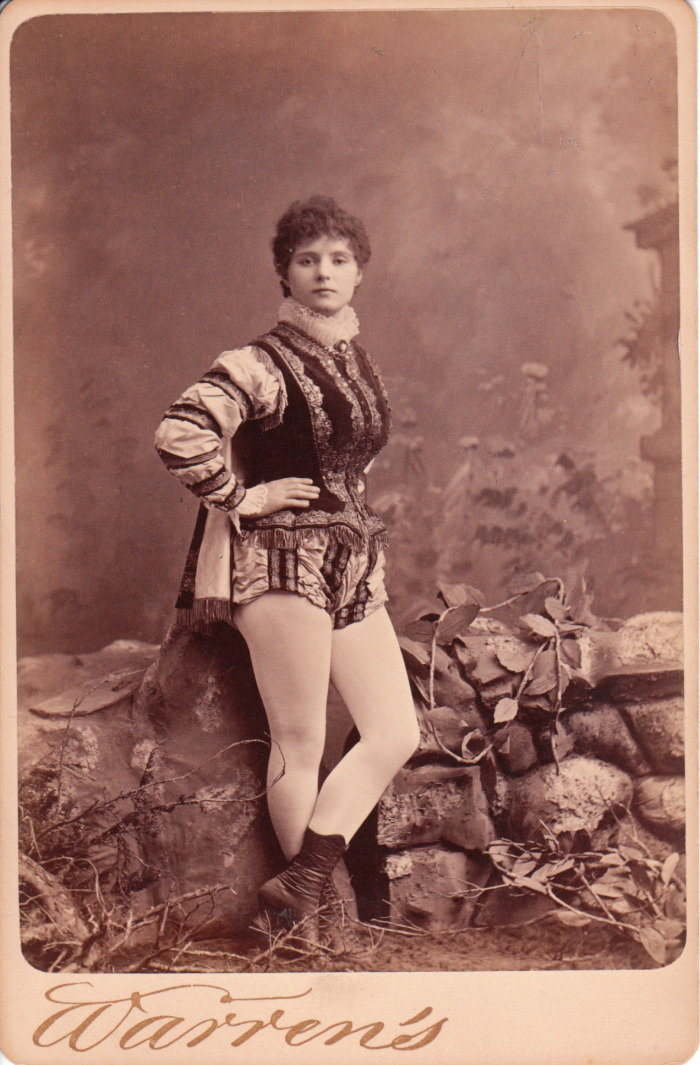
Kate Everleigh in about 1880

Kate Everleigh (1864 – 8 February 1926) was a serio-comic actress and singer of the late Victorian era who was a music hall and burlesque performer as well as appearing in pantomime and musical theatre.

In America in 1877, with Lydia Thompson's Company, she appeared in Reece and Farnie's burlesque Oxygen, or, Prince Fritz of Virgamen Reece's burlesque of Robinson Crusoe and a version of Bluebeard. Other appearances in the United States included a production of The Magic Slipper with the Colville Opera Company at the Bush Street Theatre in San Francisco in November 1879. A critic wrote of her performance, "Miss Kate Everleigh made a handsome Prince, and might perhaps have scored a success had she been compelled to act the part in pantomime". Everleigh also appeared in a burlesque with the Famous Colville Opera Burlesque Company at the California Theatre in San Francisco called Ill Treated Il Travotore, Or, The Mother, The Maiden, and The Musicianer (1880).

In London she appeared in the burlesque The Babes, or, Whines from the Wood (1884) and as Captain Delaunay in the original London cast of Erminie (1885). The magazine The Theatre in 1885 stated that she had also appeared in the shows Nemesis (1885); The Bride of Song (1864), a one-act operetta with music by Julius Benedict and words by Henry Brougham Farnie, and Family Ties. Everleigh acted in Eastward Ho! at the Opera Comique (1894). In 1889 she appeared at the Alexandra Theatre in a benefit night for Alfred Hemming. She played the lead role of Daisy in the musical comedy drama Kittens at the Theatre Royal, Brighton and also appeared in The Pet of Park Lane.

A stage beauty, her portrait was printed on the front page of The Illustrated Sporting and Dramatic News in 1885 and 1886. She was also known for playing the Principal Boy in pantomime, including playing Dick Whittington.

She died in 1926 aged 62.

== Gallery ==
Kate Everleigh on the cover of The Illustrated Sporting and Dramatic News (1885)

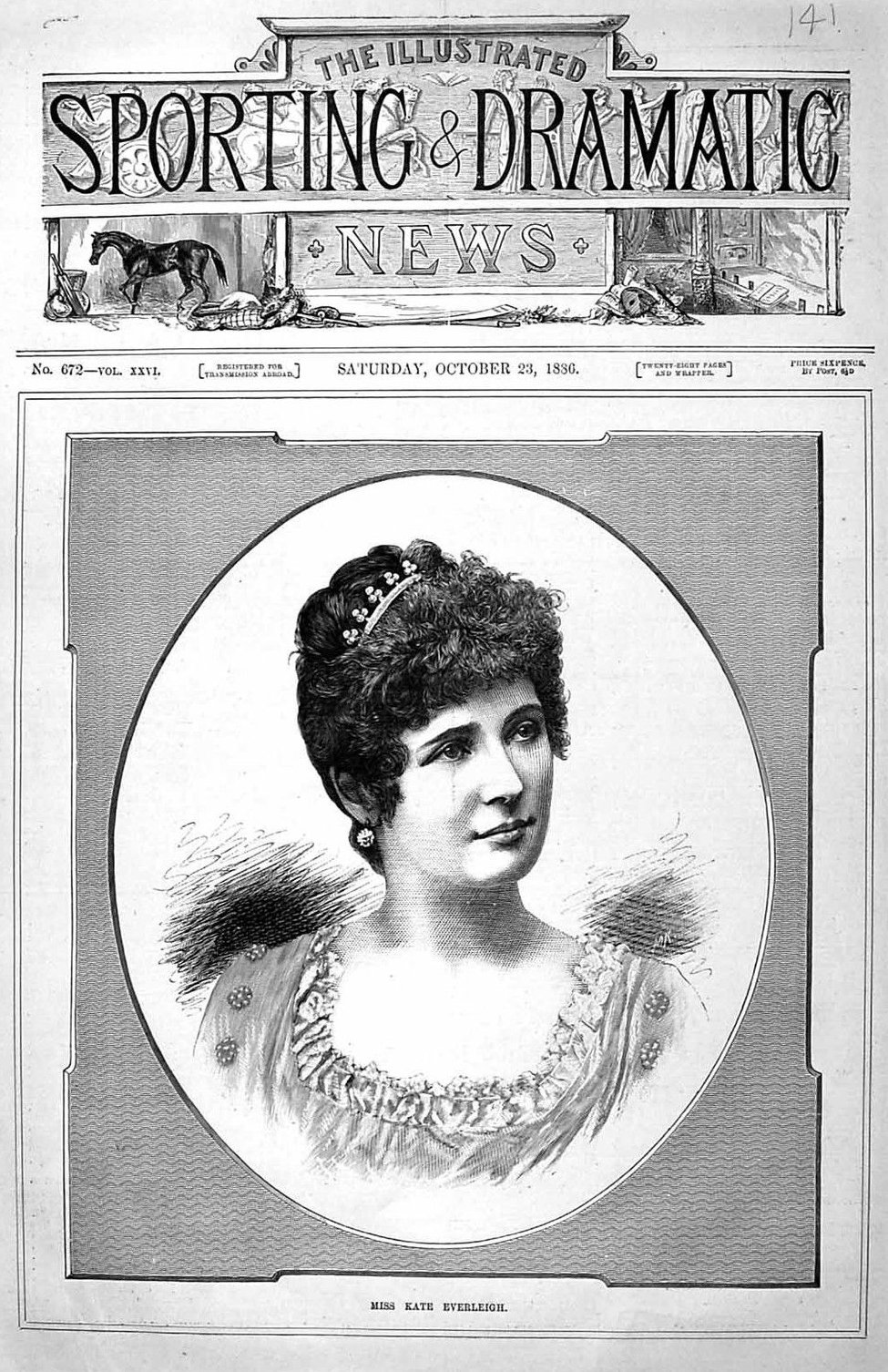
Kate Everleigh on the cover of The Illustrated Sporting and Dramatic News (1886)
