= Lillian Russell =

American singer and actress (1860–1922)

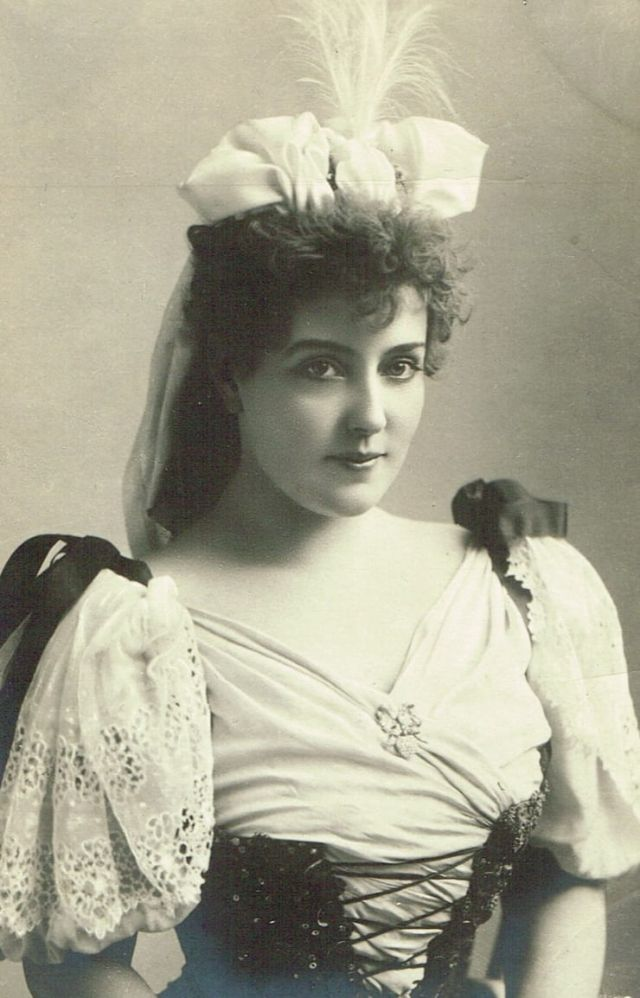
- Russell in 1898
- Born: Helen Louise Leonard; December 4, 1860 (or 1861); Clinton, Iowa, U.S.
- Died: June 6, 1922 (aged 60–61); Pittsburgh, Pennsylvania, U.S.
- Occupations: Actress, singer
- Years active: 1879–1919
- Spouses: Harry Braham (m. 1879; div. 1881) Edward Solomon (m. 1885; ann. 1893) John Chatterton (m. 1894; div. 1898) Alexander Pollock Moore (m. 1912)
- Relatives: Cynthia Leonard (mother) Charles E. Leonard (father)

Lillian Russell (born Helen Louise Leonard; December 4, 1860 or 1861 – June 6, 1922) was an American actress and singer. She became one of the most famous actresses and singers of the late 19th and early 20th centuries, praised for her beauty and style, as well as for her voice and stage presence.

Russell was born in Clinton, Iowa, but raised in Chicago. Her parents separated when she was 18, and she moved to New York with her mother. She began to perform professionally by 1879, singing for Tony Pastor and playing roles in comic opera, including Gilbert and Sullivan works. Composer Edward Solomon created roles in several of his comic operas for her in London. In 1884, they returned to New York and married in 1885, but in 1886, Solomon was arrested for bigamy. For many years, she was the foremost singer of operettas and musical theatre in the United States, performing continuously through the end of the 19th century.

In 1899, she joined the Weber and Fields' Broadway Music Hall, where she starred for five years. After 1904, she began to have vocal difficulties and switched to dramatic roles. She later returned to musical roles in vaudeville and retired from performing around 1919. Russell was married four times, but her longest relationship was with Diamond Jim Brady, who supported her extravagant lifestyle for four decades. In later years, she wrote a newspaper column, advocated women's suffrage, was a popular lecturer, and contributed to the passage of the restrictive Immigration Act of 1924.

== Life and career ==
Russell was born Helen Louise Leonard in Clinton, Iowa, the fourth of five daughters of newspaper publisher Charles E. Leonard, and author and feminist Cynthia Leonard, the first woman to run for mayor of New York City. Her family moved to Chicago in 1865, where she studied at the Convent of the Sacred Heart from age 7 to 15 and then at the Park Institute. Her father became a partner in the printing firm of Knight & Leonard, and her mother became active in the women's rights movement. Russell, called Nellie as a child, excelled at school theatricals. In her teens, she studied music privately and sang in choirs. In December 1877, she performed in an amateur production of Time Tries All at Chickering Hall in Chicago.

=== Early career ===
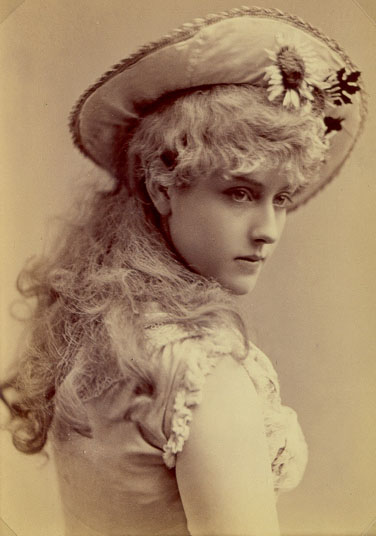
in Patience, 1882

When Russell was 18, her parents separated, and she, her mother and her younger sister moved to New York City, where her mother did suffrage work for Susan B. Anthony. Russell studied singing under Leopold Damrosch and considered pursuing an operatic career; her very religious mother disapproved of her working in theatre, which she considered disreputable. Russell began dating Walter Sinn, whose father owned the Brooklyn Park Theatre. Walter's mother helped Russell get a chorus job (as Nellie Leonard) with Edward E. Rice, who was touring his musical Evangeline to Boston beginning in September 1879, together with Gilbert and Sullivan's comic opera H.M.S. Pinafore. Russell soon began seeing the orchestra leader Harry Braham and became pregnant. They married in November when the show moved to New York theatres. She gave birth to their son Harry in June 1880. In September, Braham got a prestigious job conducting at Tony Pastor's Theatre on Broadway. Pastor, known as the father of vaudeville, was responsible for introducing many well-known performers. In November 1880, Pastor engaged Russell for his variety shows. At his suggestion, she chose a stage name, Lillian Russell, and Pastor introduced her as an "English ballad singer". She was immediately popular with audiences and soon was acting in skits, as well as singing. In early 1881, the baby died after his nanny accidentally penetrated his stomach with a diaper pin. Braham came home to find the dying baby. The tragedy exacerbated Russell's difficult relationship with her mother and led to her divorce from Braham.

In the summer of 1881, Russell toured with Pastor's company. That fall, she played the leading soprano role of Mabel in a burlesque of The Pirates of Penzance at Pastor's theatre. She next played at the Bijou Opera House on Broadway as Djenna in The Great Mogul and with the McCaull Comic Opera Company played Bathilda there in Olivette. She also played the title role in Gilbert and Sullivan's Patience and Aline in The Sorcerer in 1882 at the Bijou.

=== Marriage to a bigamist and peak years ===
Russell met composer Edward Solomon later in 1882 at Pastor's New York Casino Theatre where he was the season's musical director and she became the star. Unaware of his first marriage, she became his mistress and they sailed together to London. There she starred in several works he wrote specifically for her, including Virginia in Paul and Virginia, Phoebe in Billee Taylor, and the title roles in Polly, or the Pet of the Regiment and Pocahontas. While in London, she was engaged to create the title role in Gilbert and Sullivan's Princess Ida (1884), but she clashed with W.S. Gilbert and was dismissed during rehearsals.

Solomon's comic operas were not highly successful in Britain, so Russell and Solomon returned to America. They had a daughter together, Dorothy Lillian Russell, in 1884, and married in New Jersey in 1885. Russell was very well received in Solomon's works, on tour in the U.S. for Pastor. Another Solomon success for Russell and Pastor was Pepita; or, the Girl with the Glass Eyes. Russell also played in New York theatres or on tour in Gilbert and Sullivan and in operettas. Her relationship with Solomon soured, mostly due to his poor finances, and their last show, The Maid and the Moonshiner (1886), was a flop. When creditors sued Solomon, he fled the country. In 1886, Solomon was arrested for bigamy because his previous marriage had not been dissolved. Russell obtained a divorce from Solomon in 1893.

Russell in Giroflé-Girofla, 1890s

Russell continued to star in comic opera and other musical theatre. She toured with the J.C. Duff Opera Company between other engagements for two years beginning in 1886. In 1887, she starred as Carlotta in Gasparone by Karl Millöcker in New York City at the Standard Theatre, together with Eugène Oudin and J.H. Ryley. Later the same year, she was back at the Casino Theatre in the title role of Dorothy, and over the next several years, she continued to star in operettas and musical theatre on Broadway. Her parts at this time included the title role in The Grand Duchess of Gerolstein, Fiorella in The Brigands (in a translation by W.S. Gilbert), Teresa in The Mountebanks, Marion in La Cigale, and Rosa in Princess Nicotine. In 1891, she opened at the Garden Theatre as the star of the Lillian Russell Opera Company. Giroflé-Girofla was a favorite of Russell, who played the dual lead role in Chicago, New York and on tour in the 1890s.

For many years, Russell was the foremost singer of operettas in America. Her voice, stage presence and beauty were the subject of a great deal of fanfare in the news media, and she was extremely popular with audiences. Actress Marie Dressler observed, "I can still recall the rush of pure awe that marked her entrance on the stage. And then the thunderous applause that swept from orchestra to gallery, to the very roof." When Alexander Graham Bell introduced long-distance telephone service on May 8, 1890, Russell's voice was the first carried over the line. From New York City, Russell sang the saber song from La Grande-Duchesse de Gérolstein to audiences in Boston and Washington, D.C. She rode a bicycle custom made for her by Tiffany & Co. It was a gold-plated machine that displayed the jeweler's art at its most opulent and unconventional – the handlebars inlaid with mother-of-pearl and the wheel spokes featuring her initials set in diamonds. She had "a cream serge leg-of-mutton sleeve cycling suit with the skirt shortened by three inches, which caused a sensation and set a trend."

She married tenor John Haley Augustin Chatterton (known professionally as Signor Giovanni Perugini) in 1894, but they soon separated, and in 1898, they divorced. In the spring of 1894, she returned to London to play Betta in The Queen of Brilliants by Edward Jakobowski and then played the same role in the New York production at Abbey's Theatre. She remained at Abbey's, playing several roles, but when that theatre shut down in 1896, she played in other Broadway houses in more operettas by Offenbach (such as The Princess of Trebizonde and many others), Victor Herbert and others, such as Erminie (at the Casino Theatre) in 1899.

For 40 years, Russell was also the companion of businessman "Diamond Jim" Brady, who showered her with expensive gifts of diamonds and gemstones and supported her extravagant lifestyle. Russell was said to be able nearly to match Brady's excessive eating habits, and would do so in public. While she was proud of her ability, it led to long-term struggles with her weight which, at her heaviest, approached 200 pounds.

=== Later years ===
Come Down Ma Evenin' Star
Lillian Russell's only known recording, from 1912

In 1899, Russell joined the Weber and Fields Music Hall, where she starred in their burlesques and other entertainments until 1904. Her first production there was Fiddle-dee-dee in 1899 which also featured DeWolf Hopper, Fay Templeton and David Warfield. Other favorites were Whoop-de-doo and The Big Little Princess. Before the 1902 production of Twirly-Whirly, John Stromberg, who had composed several hit songs for her, delayed giving Russell her solo for several days, saying that it was not ready. When he committed suicide a few days before the first rehearsal, sheet music for "Come Down Ma Evenin' Star" was discovered in his coat pocket. It became Russell's signature song and is the only one she is known to have recorded, although the recording was made after Russell's voice had deteriorated significantly.

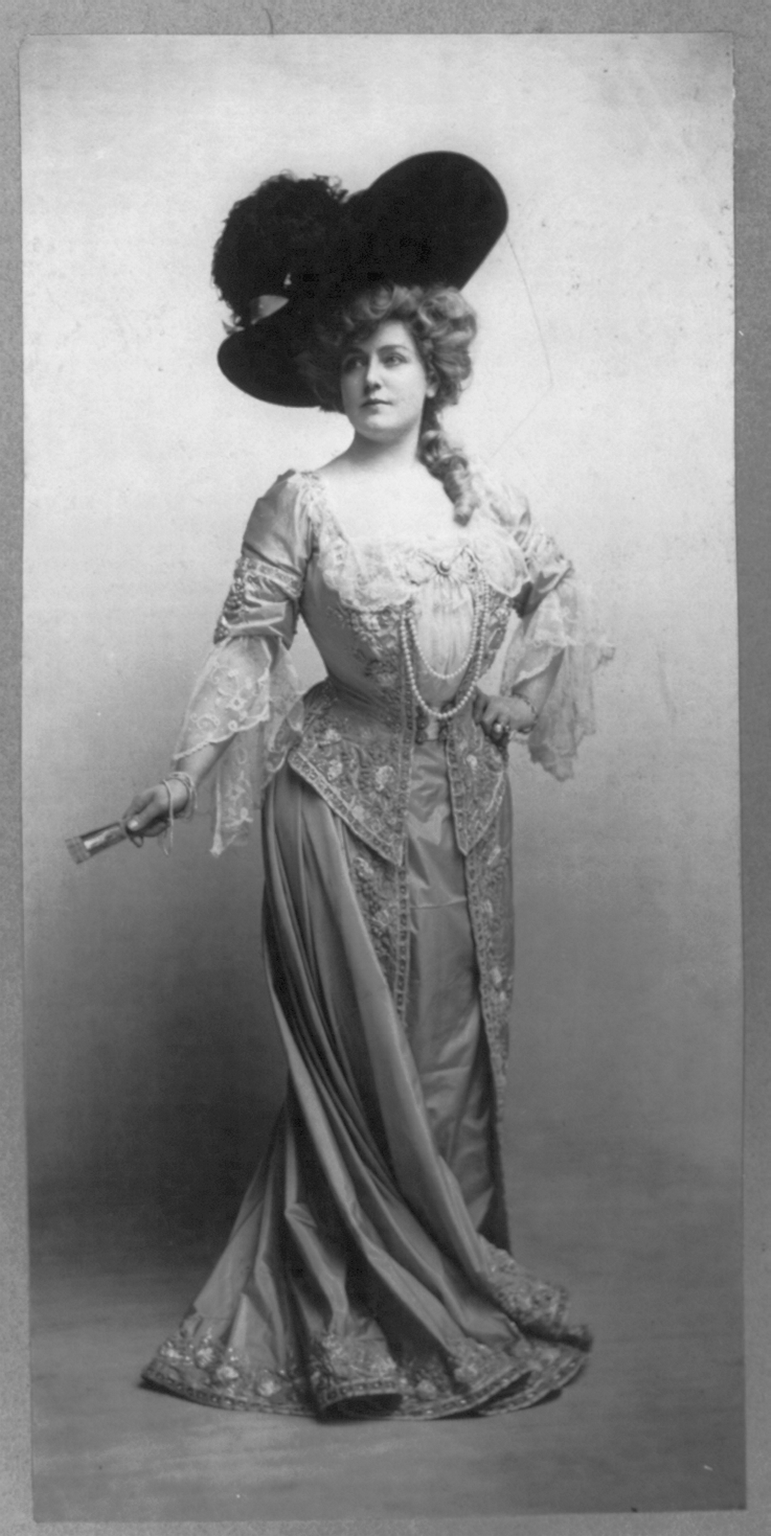
Russell in Lady Teazle (1904)

Leaving Weber and Fields, she next played the title role of Lady Teazle in 1904 at the Casino Theatre and then began to play in vaudeville. After 1904, Russell began to have vocal difficulties, but she did not retire from the stage. Instead, she switched to non-musical comedies, touring from 1906 to 1908 under the management of James Brooks. In 1906, she played the title role in Barbara's Millions, and in 1908 she was Henrietta Barrington in Wildfire. The next year she was Laura Curtis in The Widow's Might. In 1911, she toured in In Search of a Sinner. Russell then returned to singing, appearing in burlesque, variety and other entertainments.

In 1912, she married her fourth husband, Alexander Pollock Moore, owner of the Pittsburgh Leader, and mostly retired from the stage. The wedding was held in Pittsburgh at the grand Schenley Hotel, which today is a national historic landmark and the University of Pittsburgh's student union building. Russell lived, for a time, in suite 437 of the hotel, now located in the offices of the student newspaper, The Pitt News. The same year, she made her last appearance on Broadway in Weber & Fields' Hokey Pokey. In 1915, Russell appeared with Lionel Barrymore in the motion picture Wildfire, which was based on the 1908 play in which she had appeared. This was one of her few motion picture appearances. She appeared in vaudeville until 1919, when ill health forced her to leave the stage entirely, after a four-decade long career.

Beginning around 1912, Russell wrote a newspaper column, became active in the women's suffrage movement (as her mother had been), and was a popular lecturer on personal relationships, health and beauty, advocating an optimistic philosophy of self-help and drawing large crowds. In 1913, she declared that she would refuse to pay her income taxes to protest "the denial of the ballot to women." Nonetheless, she recruited for the U.S. Marine Corps during World War I and raised money for the war effort.

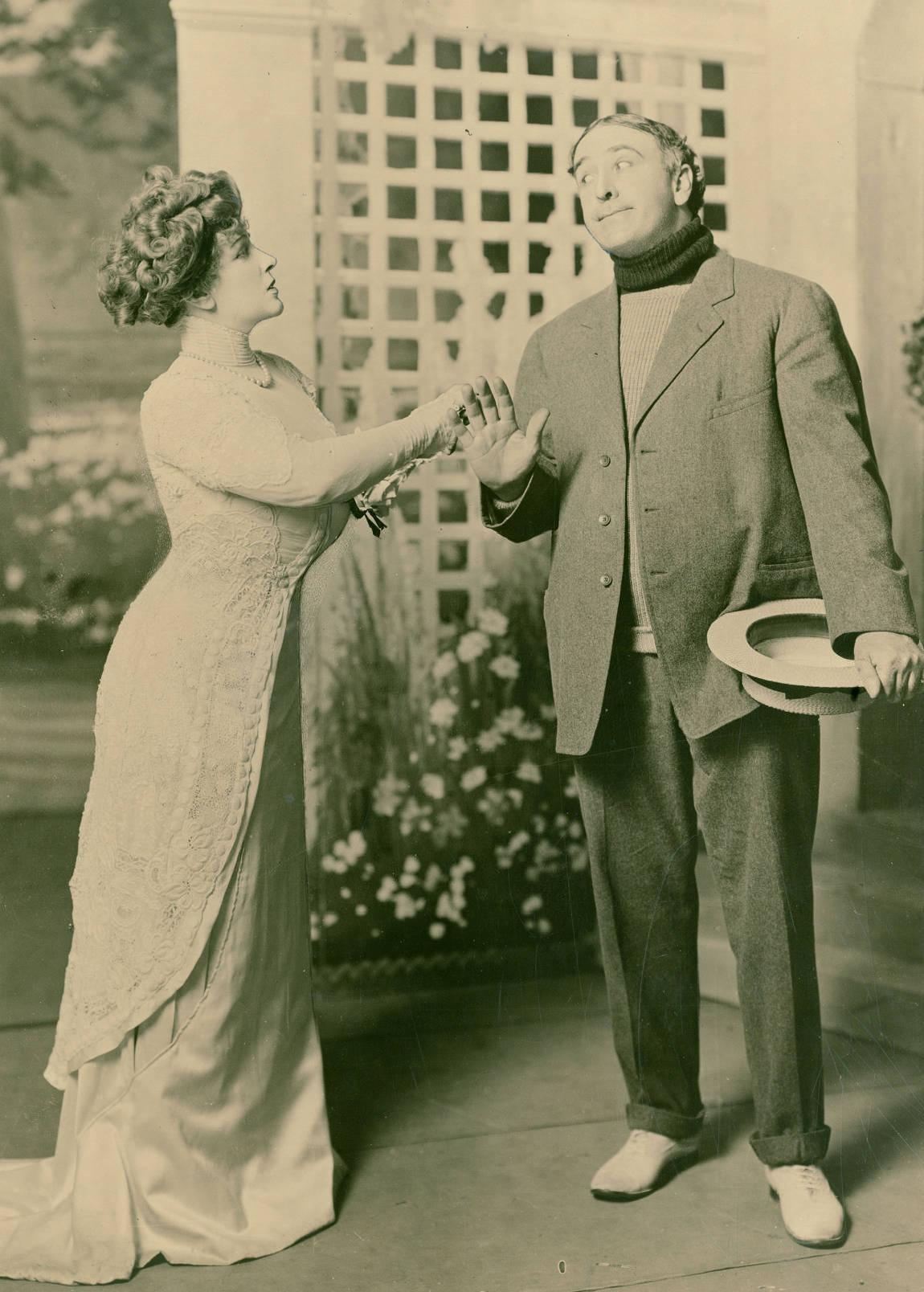
Russell with Frank Sheridan in the play Wildfire (1908)

Russell became a wealthy woman, and during the 1919 Actors' Equity Association strike, she made a major donation of money to sponsor the formation of the Chorus Equity Association by the chorus girls at the Ziegfeld Follies. In March 1922, Russell traveled aboard the RMS Aquitania from Southampton, England, to the Port of New York on the March 11–17 crossing. According to The New York Times, she "established a precedent by acting as Chairman of the ship's concert, the first woman, so far as the records show, to preside at an entertainment on shipboard."

=== Fact-finding mission and death ===
In 1922, Russell undertook a fact-finding mission to Europe on behalf of President Warren Harding. The mission was to investigate the increase in immigration. She recommended a five-year moratorium on immigration and a minimum of 21 years residency before making application for naturalization. Russell stated: "only the useless in the reconstruction of their countries are seeking to come to the United States ... the immigration of recent years has been from that class of people which arrests rather than aids, the development of any nation". Her findings were instrumental in developing the content of the Immigration Act of 1924, which greatly restricted immigration of southern and eastern Europeans and banned the immigration of Asians.

Russell suffered apparently minor injuries on the return trip, which, however, led to complications, and she died after ten days of illness at her home in Pittsburgh, Pennsylvania. Thousands of people lined the route of her military funeral, attended by many actors and politicians; President Harding sent a wreath that was set atop her casket. She is interred in her family's private mausoleum in the Allegheny Cemetery in Pittsburgh, Pennsylvania.

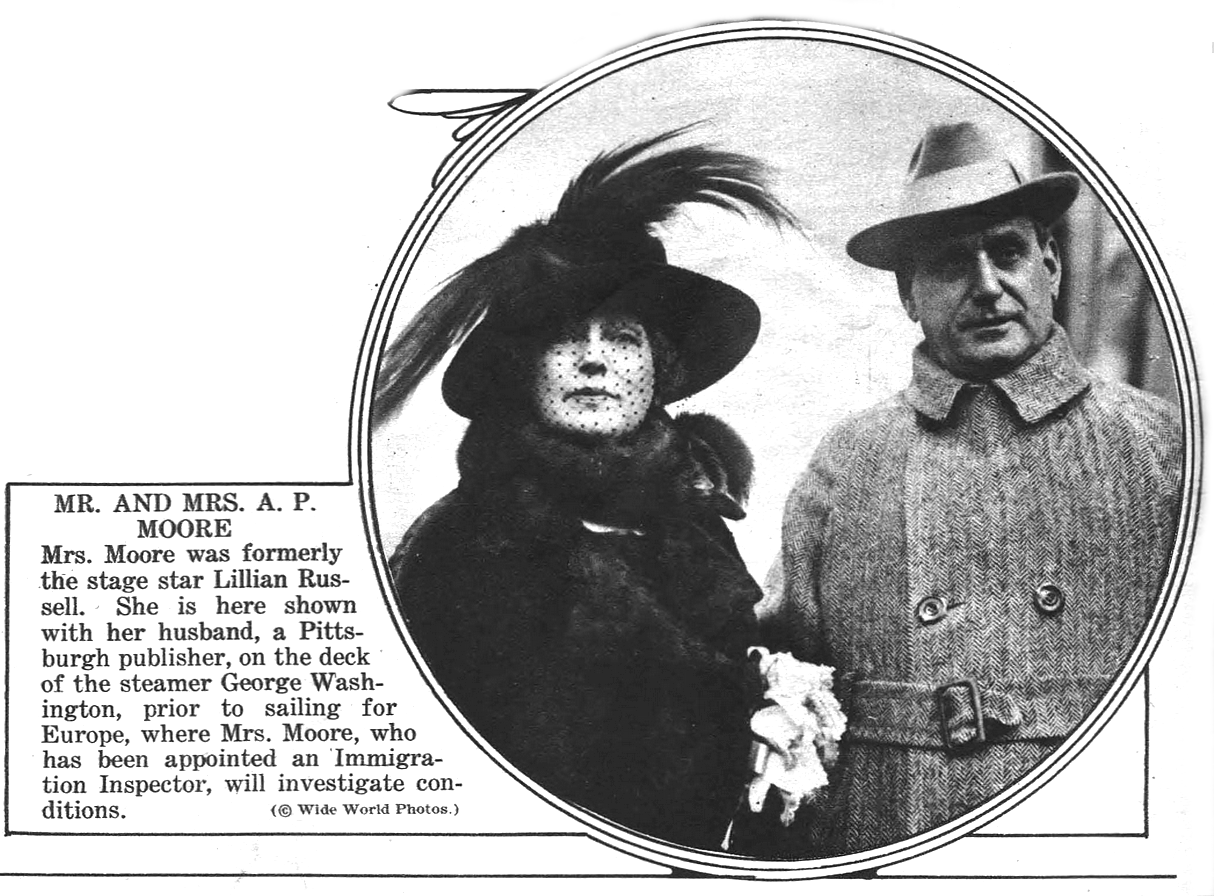
Russell and Moore, just before her fact-finding mission to Europe in 1922

== Thoroughbred racing ==
Lillian Russell's friend Diamond Jim Brady was a significant owner of thoroughbred racehorses and may have influenced her decision to become involved in the sport. In August 1906, her press agent announced she had acquired eight colts sired by the New Zealand stallion Carbine for her new thoroughbred racing stable. She competed under the nom de course "Mr. Clinton" with racing colors to be navy blue with a white star.

== Legacy ==
A full-length portrait of Russell was painted in 1902 by the Swiss-born American artist Adolfo Müller-Ury (1862–1947) who also painted another oval half-length, but both portraits are missing. A 1940 film was made about Russell, although it presents a sanitized version of Russell's life. It was directed by Irving Cummings, and stars Alice Faye as Russell, with Henry Fonda, Don Ameche, Edward Arnold and Warren William. Marilyn Monroe posed as Russell for Life. She was portrayed by Andrea King in the 1947 film My Wild Irish Rose.

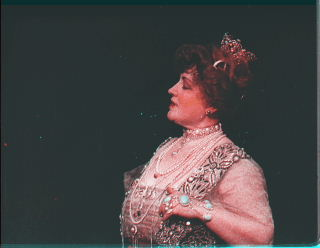
Russell in How to Live 100 Years, a 1913 Kinemacolor short

The Lillian Russell Theatre aboard the City of Clinton Showboat is a summer stock theatre named after Russell in her hometown of Clinton, Iowa. The University of Pittsburgh's student activities building, the William Pitt Union, has a Lillian Russell Room on its fourth floor, in the offices of The Pitt News, in the same location where Russell lived when the building was the Schenley Hotel. The room contains a portrait of Russell.

== Films ==
- Lillian Russell (1906 short) as herself
- La Tosca (1911 short)
- How to Live 100 Years (1913 Kinemacolor short) as herself
- Popular Players Off the Stage (1913 short documentary) as herself
- Potted Pantomimes (1914)
- Wildfire (1915)
