= Erminie =

Comic opera composed by Edward Jakobowski

Poster from an 1894 production of Erminie at the Theatre Royal in Edinburgh

Erminie is a comic opera in two acts composed by Edward Jakobowski with a libretto by Claxson Bellamy and Harry Paulton, based loosely on Charles Selby's 1834 English translation of the French melodrama, Robert Macaire. The story concerns an arranged engagement between Ermine and Ernest, but both are in love with someone else.

The piece first played in Birmingham, England, and then in London in 1885. A long-running production opened on Broadway in 1886, and the opera enjoyed unusual international success that endured into the twentieth century.

== Performance history ==
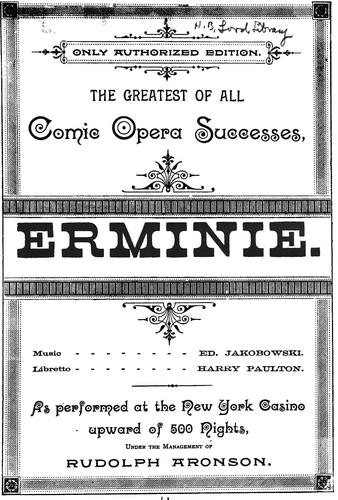
Cover of the New York edition of Erminie (1887)

Ravennes and Cadeaux at the Theatre Royal, Edinburgh (1894)

Erminie opened at the Grand Theatre, Birmingham, England, on 26 October 1885. It transferred to the Comedy Theatre in London, then under the management of Violet Melnotte, opening on 9 November 1885 and playing for a total original run of 154 performances. It starred Florence St. John who, being pregnant, ceded the role to a young Marie Tempest in December; Melnotte took the role of Cerise. On 18 February 1886, the piece moved to the Gaiety Theatre, London, and by the end of 1885 another cast had begun touring the piece in the British provinces. It soon toured throughout the world, reaching Australia by 1889.

The Broadway, New York production was extraordinarily successful, opening at the Casino Theatre on 10 May 1886 and running for 571 performances. It starred Pauline Hall as the title character and Francis Wilson as Cadeaux. DeWolf Hopper and Sylvia Gerrish later joined the cast. Erminie enjoyed many UK, US and foreign productions and was revived on Broadway in 1893, 1899, 1903 and in 1921 with Wilson and Hopper again assuming their 1886 roles.

Amateur productions were also mounted between 1895 and 1921. Erminie was performed as a staged concert production in July 2008 by the Lyric Theatre of San Jose in Mountain View, California.

== Roles and original casts (London/New York) ==
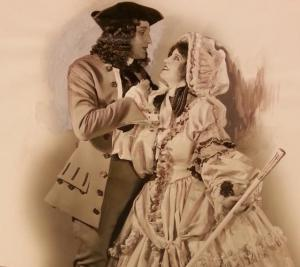
Irene Williams and Warren Proctor as Eminie and Eugène, 1921 Broadway revival

- Marquis de Pontvert – Fred Mervin/Carl Irving
- Eugène Marcel (the Marquis' secretary) – Henry Bracy/Harry Pepper
- Vicomte Ernest de Brissac – Horace Bolini/C. L. Weeks
- Captain Delaunay (a young officer) – Kate Everleigh/Rose Beaudet (later Sylvia Gerrish)
- Sergeant – A. D. Pierrepoint/E. Furry
- Dufois (the Landlord of the Lion d'Or) – George Marler/Murray Woods
- Simon (a Waiter) – J. W. Bradbury/A.W. Maflin
- Henri – Stanley Betjeman
- Pierre – Lottie Leigh
- Chevalier de Brabazon (the Marquis' guest) – Percy Compton/Max Freeman
- Ravennes (a thief) – Frank Wyatt/W. S. Daboll (later DeWolf Hopper)
- Cadeaux (a thief) – Harry Paulton/Francis Wilson
- Cerise Marcel (Erminie's companion) – Violet Melnotte/Marion Manola
- Javotte (Erminie's maid) – K. Munroe, later Marie Jansen/Marie Jansen
- Marie – Edith Vane/Victoria Schilling
- Clementine – Delia Merton
- Princesse de Gramponeur – M. A. Victor/Jennie Weathersby
- Erminie de Pontvert – Florence St. John (later Marie Tempest)/Pauline Hall
- Mesdemoiselles St. Brice, D'Auvigne, De Nailles and de Sangres – Nellie Gordon, Kitty Graham, Marie Huntley and Violet Leigh
- Mesdames St. Brice, de Lage, de Brefchamp and de Chateauln – Lillie Teesdale, Ada Maxwell, Ethel Selwyn and Millie Gerard
- Antoinette, Charlotte, Jeanette, Mignon, Rosalie, Niniche, Nanine and Fanchette – Madge Bruce, Emilie Campbell, Anita Marzan, Florence Dudley, Carrie Solomon, Helen Gwynne, Mary Webb and Sylvia Southgate

== Synopsis ==
Act I

Erminie is the daughter of the Marquis de Pontvert. She has been promised, in an arranged marriage, to Ernest, Vicomte de Brissac. He is a young nobleman and the son of an old war comrade of Erminie's father. Erminie and Ernest have never met each other. Erminie, however, is secretly in love with her father's secretary, Eugène, and Ernest is secretly in love with Cerise Marcel, who is Eugene's sister and Erminie's friend. Eugène and Cerise are orphans who were taken into his household by Erminie's father. Eugene feels that his subservient position makes it impossible for him to ask the Marquis for Erminie's hand in marriage.

On his way to the betrothal ceremony, Ernest runs into a pair of crafty "philanthropists" (thieves), Ravennes and Cadeau, who steal his money and wardrobe and tie him to a tree. They disguise Ravennes as Ernest and Cadeau as a Baron and blunder into the Lion d'Or for the betrothal, saying that they were waylaid by thieves. Seeing the wealthy wedding guests, they scheme to make off with a lot of money. Cadeaux gets drunk, however, and his bad manners nearly spoil the scheme. Ernest eventually escapes his bonds and arrives late and in disordered attire at the Lion d'Or. Seeing Ernest, Ravennes cries "Seize the villain," claiming that Ernest is the thief who attacked them earlier in the day. Ernest is arrested and tossed in jail.

Act II

At the Chateau Pontvert that evening, Ravennes, still disguised as Ernest, pretends sympathy for Erminie's love for Eugene. He promises to help her to elope. At the same time, she unwittingly helps him to rob the house and the wedding guests. Eventually, however, in a farcical comedy of errors and mistaken identities, the plan fails, and the robbers are arrested. Nevertheless, their scheming inadvertently rescues Erminie from the arranged marriage, as both pairs – Eugene and Erminie, and Ernest and Cerise – are happily united.

== Musical numbers ==
Act I – The Village Fête in Pontvert, France.

- No. 1 – Chorus: "Around in a whirl we skip, dance and twirl"
- No. 2 – Chorus: "Vive le Marquis! ... welcome to the fête"
- No. 3 – Erminie & Chorus: "Ah, when love is young, all the world seems gay!"
- No. 4 – Erminie & Eugène: "There is a sweet remembrance of the past"
- No. 5 – Chorus: "All for glory the soldier's life"
- No. 6 – Marquis & Chorus: "Dull is the life of the soldier in peace"
- No. 6a – Exit (reprise): "All for glory the soldier's life"
- Nos. 7 & 7a – Ravennes & Cadeaux: "We're a philanthropic couple"
- No. 8 – Erminie: "At midnight on my pillow lying, by daily toil oppress'd"
- No. 9 – Concerted piece: "The blissful pleasure I profess of such a meeting"
- No. 10 – Finale Act I: "Away to the chateau, away from the throng, where bridegroom and bride will be plighted ere long"

Act II – The Ballroom in the Marquis de Pontvert's Chateau.

- No. 10a – Entr'acte
- No. 11 – Chorus & Marie: "Here on lord and lady waiting"
- No. 12 – Eugène: "Darkest the hour ere light of dawn beameth"
- No. 13 – Chorus & Erminie: "Joy attend our Erminie"
- No. 14 – Erminie: "A lover in his mirror gaz'd, with visage wan, and glare half-craz'd"
- No. 15 – Cadeaux & Whistling Chorus: "I'm not a free agent" ("What the Dicky Bird Says")
- No. 16 – Vocal Gavotte: "Join in pleasure, dance a measure"
- No. 17 – Erminie & Chorus: "Dear mother, in dreams I see her"
- Nos. 18 & 19 – Chorus: "Come to supper, let's repair"
- No. 20 – Concerted piece (unaccompanied): "'Tis growing late"
- No. 21 – Finale Act II: "Should we gain your favours, ev'ry heart is gay"

== Namesake ==
A minor planet, 705 Erminia, is named after the work.

== Gallery ==
From the 1885 production at the Comedy Theatre

From a British production c.1886

From the 1894 production in Edinburgh
