= Harry Monkhouse =

Monkhouse as Bartolo in The Mountebanks, 1892

Harry Monkhouse was the stage name of John Adolph McKie (18 May 1854 – 18 February 1901), a comic actor and singer. He appeared in the British provinces, the West End and featured in a round the world tour of A Gaiety Girl in 1893 to 1895.

== Life and career ==
Monkhouse was born in Newcastle-upon-Tyne and was educated at the local grammar school. He acted as an amateur before turning professional, aged 17. At the Grecian Theatre, London in 1879 he came to public notice in The Black Flag playing the comic role of Sim Lazarus in an otherwise serious drama. Having come to the attention of West End managers, he obtained engagements at the Alhambra and the Gaiety theatres, appearing in Arthur Matthison's burlesque melodrama More Than Ever in November 1882. The following March he appeared as Tête de Veau in Blue Beard by F. C. Burnand, with Nellie Farren and Frank Wyatt.

When Farren enlisted some of her colleagues at the Gaiety for a tour of the British provinces Monkhouse joined her, and subsequently he went on tour on his own account with a "farcical burlesque comedy" called Larks, first produced in Southport in February 1886. In 1889 Monkhouse again appeared in London, playing Bouillabaisse in Robert Planquette's Paul Jones for the Carl Rosa opera company at the Prince of Wales Theatre. In Marjorie (January 1890), he was Gosrie, and in Captain Therese (August 1890) he played M. Duvet. In The Rose and the Ring (December 1890) he was cast as Valoroso.

Monkhouse (left) as Sir Tristram Testy in Maid Marian, 1891, with Harry Parker and John Le Hay

In February 1891 Monkhouse played Sir Tristram Testy in Maid Marian by Harry B. Smith and Reginald De Koven. In June of that year he succeeded Lionel Brough as Vanderkoopen in La Cigale in a long run at the Lyric Theatre. After touring in his own production of Pat, he returned to the West End in 1892 to play Bartolo in The Mountebanks by W. S. Gilbert and Alfred Cellier; The Era said of his performance that it compelled the audience to hold their sides, "for we laugh until they ache".

In October 1892 Monkhouse played Don Pedro in Charles Lecocq's Incognita at the Lyric. The following January at the Shaftesbury Theatre he produced but did not appear in La Rosière, his own adaptation of Jaconde, an old French opéra comique with new music by Edward Jakobowski. After appearing as Carambollas in The Magic Opal at the Lyric and in the title role in Poor Jonathan he played the Rev Montagu Brierly in A Gaiety Girl in the West End in 1893–1894 and then on a world tour in 1894–1895. Back in the West End, he created the roles of Marquis Imar in The Geisha in April 1896, and Sir Titus Wemyss in The Circus Girl in December of that year. He then revived Larks for a provincial tour, before returning the cast of The Circus Girl.

In November 1900 Monkhouse, together with Decima Moore, joined the cast of the long-running Florodora at the Lyric. While he was in this run he was declared bankrupt, having sustained heavy losses with his touring company. He died the following February in St Thomas' Hospital, London, aged 46.
