= Horace Sedger =

British theatre manager (1853–1917)

Sedger in 1893

Horace Sedger (1853–1917) was an American-born British theatre manager and impresario. He was particularly associated with light opera, and presented works by composers including Isaac Albéniz, Edmond Audran, Ivan Caryll, Alfred Cellier, Charles Lecocq and André Messager and librettists including W. S. Gilbert, Arthur Law and B. C. Stephenson. His most successful productions were Cellier's Dorothy (1886), which ran for an unprecedented 931 performances, and an English adaptation of Audran's La cigale et la fourmi (1891). Sedger was later active in the fledgling cinema industry.

== Life and career ==
Sedger was born in Rochester, New York, the son of Joseph Sedger, a distiller, and was intended for a commercial career. He was sent to study in Paris at the Lycée Chaptal, where he was a schoolfellow of Augustus Harris. At the age of seventeen he went to work at the London Stock Exchange, quickly becoming a senior clerk to a leading firm, a post he held for five years. In 1878 he married Harris's sister Nelly, an actress. Their only child, Daisy, born in 1879, followed her mother into the acting profession. Compelled by illness to leave his job, Sedger took a long sea-voyage, which inspired him to go into the newly developing Canadian meat-shipping business. He also tried his hand as an auctioneer and estate agent, but failed and was bankrupt for a short time in 1880.

The Mountebanks, 1892: Sedger (right) and Gilbert caricatured

For the benefit of his wife Sedger secured a lease of the Novelty Theatre in Great Queen Street, London, in December 1883, and during his connection with it he made his debut as an actor. He then joined Edgar Bruce in producing André Messager's La Bearnaise at the Prince of Wales's Theatre. In November 1886 Bruce sold the twenty-one-year lease of the theatre to Sedger, who had a record-breaking hit with the light opera Dorothy by Alfred Cellier and B. C. Stephenson, which ran at the Prince of Wales's and two other West End theatres for an unprecedented 931 performances.

Like Harris, Sedger established a relationship with the Carl Rosa Opera Company; he presented their successful production of the light opera Marjorie by Walter Slaughter at the Prince of Wales's in 1890. In the same year he also took on the lease of the Lyric Theatre in Shaftesbury Avenue, where in 1891 he presented an English adaptation of Edmond Audran's opéra comique La cigale et la fourmi, which ran for 423 performances. Over the next few years he followed this with other light operas: The Mountebanks (1892) by W. S. Gilbert, Cellier and Ivan Caryll; Incognita (1892), an adaptation of Charles Lecocq's Le coeur et la main; The Magic Opal (1893) by Arthur Law and Isaac Albéniz; The Golden Web (1893) by Stephenson, Frederick Corder and Arthur Goring Thomas; and Caryll's Little Christopher Columbus (1893). Some of these were critical and artistic successes, but overall they lost money, and in 1896 Sedger was once again in the bankruptcy court.

Sedger continued in theatre management. In 1898, together with Arthur Eliot, he presented a revival of Slaughter's Alice in Wonderland at the Opera Comique and the following year he became embroiled in a dispute with Oscar Wilde. Wilde had agreed that Sedger should present his next play, but was angered when Sedger prematurely announced that the play (which was never written) would shortly be staged.

In the 20th century Sedger moved into film, in partnership with Edward Laurillard, opening a cinema at Marble Arch in 1909. They later opened the 2,000-seat Brixton Palladium Picture Playhouse (1913).

Sedger's wife died in 1897. The following year he married Ada Elizabeth Waltham; the groom was 45, the bride 25. She divorced him for desertion in 1904. In the 1911 census he is recorded as married to a third wife, Millicent, an opera singer. Sedger died at his home in Kenley, Surrey, on 2 July 1917, aged 64, after a long illness.

== References and sources ==
=== Sources ===
- Gaye, Freda, ed. (1967). Who's Who in the Theatre (fourteenth ed.). London: Sir Isaac Pitman and Sons. OCLC 5997224.
- Nelson, James G. (2010). Publisher to the Decadents. Pennsylvania: Penn State University Press. ISBN 978-0-271-01974-1.
- Traubner, Richard (2003). Operetta: A Theatrical History. London: Routledge. ISBN 978-0-415-96641-2.
