= J. G. Robertson =

British singer and actor (1859–1940)

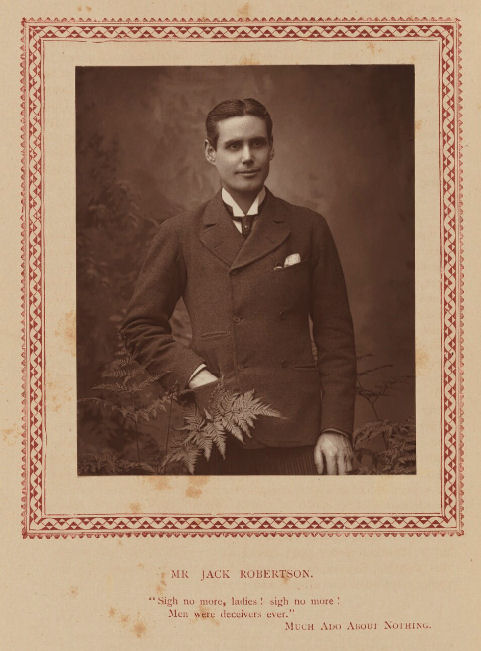
Jack Robertson in 1889

John Graham Robertson (14 February 1859 – 24 October 1940) was a Chilean-born British singer and actor. He began his career making London and New York appearances in Shakespeare with Henry Irving's company in the early 1880s. He served as principal tenor of the D'Oyly Carte Opera Company in several Gilbert and Sullivan operas at the Savoy Theatre during 1887 and 1888. Robertson produced, directed and starred in the opera Mignonette in 1889 before creating the role of Alfredo in the comic opera The Mountebanks in 1892. He concentrated on concert singing from the 1890s into the 20th century.

== Early life and career ==
Robertson was born in Valparaíso in Chile in 1859, the son of Fanny Adrienne nee Harrington (1826–1919) and William Parish Robertson (1823–1864), a merchant. A great-nephew of the merchant and author John Parish Robertson, he studied at the Royal Academy of Music.

Robertson made his London début as Balthasar in Henry Irving's production of Much Ado About Nothing at the Lyceum Theatre (1882) during which he sang "Sigh No More, Ladies". He played the same role for Irving in New York in 1884. On 16 November 1886 at Paddington in London he married Helena Wilson Woodward (1865–1947), who like him had been born in Valparaíso. and with her had four children: Olive Robertson (1888–1945); Elsie May Robertson (born 1889); Nancy Robertson (born 1896), and John Alexander Robertson (1904–1979). By 1901 at the latest the family had moved from London and were living at Ickham in Kent.

== D'Oyly Carte and later years ==
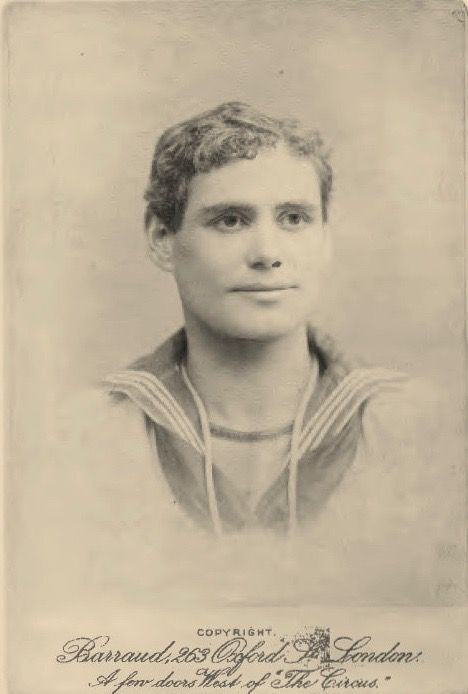
As Ralph Rackstraw in H.M.S. Pinafore (1887)

Robertson joined the D'Oyly Carte Opera Company in November 1887 in the principal tenor roles in a number of Gilbert and Sullivan revivals, playing Ralph Rackstraw in H.M.S. Pinafore (November 1887 – March 1888); Frederic in The Pirates of Penzance (March – June 1888), and Nanki-Poo in The Mikado (June – September 1888). Of Robertson in the latter role the critic of The Times wrote, "Mr. J. G. Robertson sang the music of Nanki-Poo ... with neatness and in an agreeable voice, although as an actor he still has much to learn. He does not as yet, to paraphrase a French expression, 'feel the stage'."

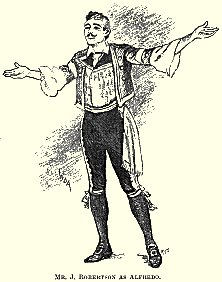
As Alfredo in The Mountebanks, The Illustrated London News (1892)

In 1889 Robertson joined the composer Henry S. Parker in a partnership to produce Parker and Oswald Brand's romantic opera Mignonette at the Royalty Theatre, and then on a tour of the provinces, with Robertson starring as Vandyke and directing the production. Other appearances in London included creating the role of Alfredo in the comic opera The Mountebanks with words by W. S. Gilbert and music by Alfred Cellier and Ivan Caryll at the Lyric Theatre (1892); the critic of The Illustrated London News described him as "a good-looking and interesting Alfredo".

Robertson then began a series of appearances on the concert stage from the 1890s into the 20th century; in 1899 he made a Berliner recording of "Sigh No More, Ladies". He made one last appearance on the London stage as Balthasar in a single matineé performance of Much Ado About Nothing at the Garrick Theatre in October 1909.

In 1939 Robertson and his wife Helena were living in Ickham in Kent, where he was listed on the register as a "Retired Professional Singer". He died there in 1940.
