= Haste to the Wedding =

Comic opera by W. S. Gilbert and George Grossmith

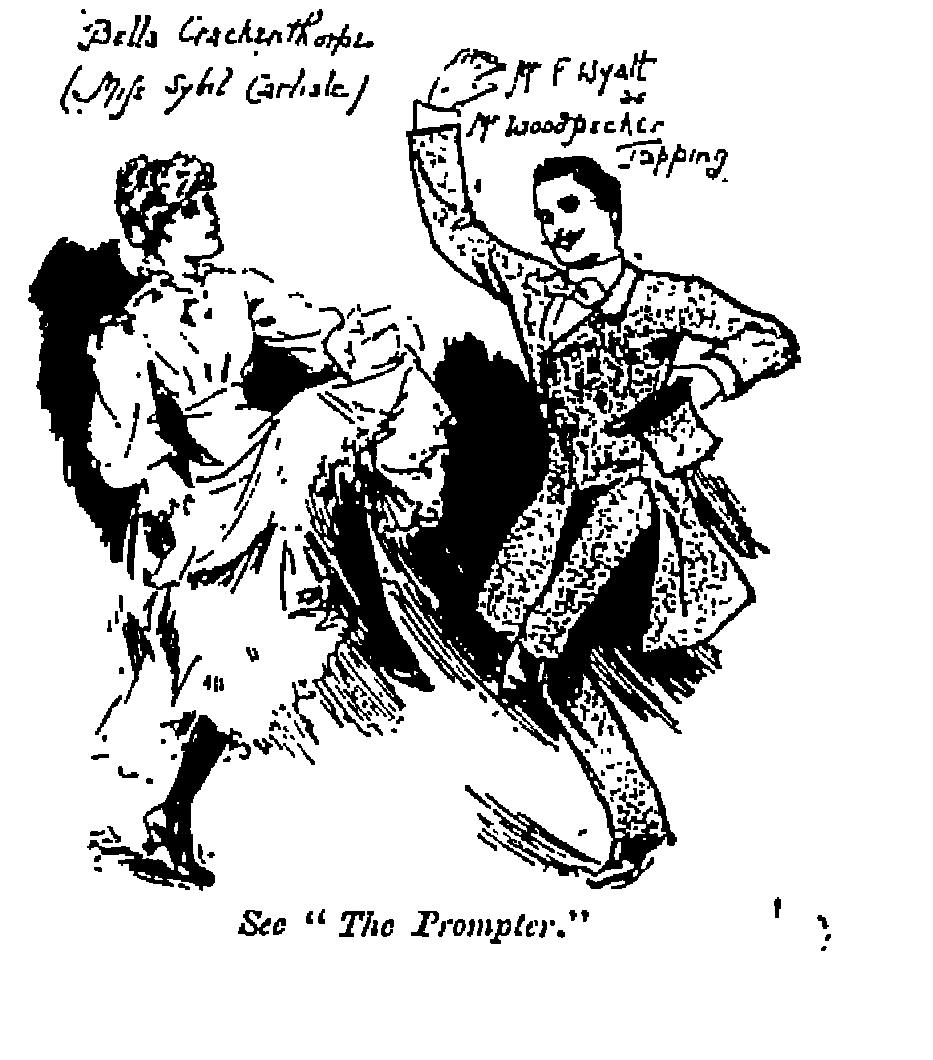
Woodpecker Tapping (Frank Wyatt) dancing with Bella Crackenthorpe (Sybil Carlisle)

Haste to the Wedding is a three-act comic opera with a libretto by W. S. Gilbert and music by George Grossmith, based on Gilbert's 1873 play, The Wedding March. The opera was the most ambitious piece of composition undertaken by Grossmith.

The piece was produced under the management of Charles Wyndham at the Criterion Theatre, London, opening on 27 July 1892. It closed on 20 August 1892, after a run of just 22 performances. Although a failure, the opera introduced the 18-year-old George Grossmith Jr., the composer's son, to the London stage. He would go on to a long career in the theatre.

== Background ==
=== The Wedding March ===
On 15 November 1873, Gilbert's play The Wedding March debuted at the Court Theatre, written under his pseudonym F. Latour Tomline. It was a free adaptation of Eugène Marin Labiche's Un chapeau de paille d'Italie ("The Italian Straw Hat"). The play was first to have been called Hunting a Hat, but the title was changed to capitalise on the popularity of the wedding march from Wagner's Lohengrin. The name of the hero, Woodpecker Tapping, was taken from Thomas Moore's ballad, "The woodpecker tapping the hollow beech tree." The play ran for about 92 performances, until 3 March 1874, a good run for the time. On the play's success, Stedman notes:

Gilbert's adaptation is a model of how a French farce could be intelligently suited to the English stage.... It depended on split-second timing, on rapid intrusions and concealments, on frantically invented expedients and mistaken identities, and on the pursuit of a crucial object: a hat of Italian straw.

The Era commented that there was "enough fun... to make half-a-dozen ordinary farces." The piece was "one of Gilbert's most frequently played successes and brought him £2,500". He told the critic William Archer, in 1904, that he had written it in just a day and a half. The play was given as part of a benefit matinee at the Gaiety Theatre, London, on 4 December 1884 with a cast starring Lionel Brough and Lydia Thompson.

The idea of turning The Wedding March into an opera was on Gilbert's mind for many years. The project was mooted in 1876 as a successor to Trial by Jury. Arthur Sullivan would have composed the score, and the composer's brother Fred (Trial's Learned Judge) would have played the bridegroom, Woodpecker Tapping, but the opera didn't materialise, perhaps due to the illness that ultimately led to Fred's early death. The script of The Wedding March makes several references to an Irish song called "Haste to the Wedding", which became the title of the later version.

=== Creation of the opera; subsequent adaptation ===
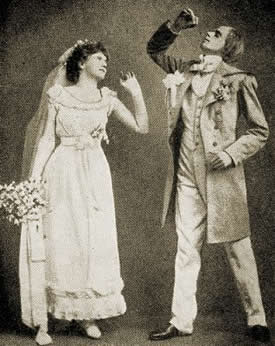
Marie Studholme and George Grossmith Jr.

By the 1890s, Gilbert's partnership with Sullivan had unravelled, and Gilbert had to find other partners. He wrote The Mountebanks with Alfred Cellier, and then turned to George Grossmith, the comic baritone of the Gilbert and Sullivan pieces from The Sorcerer (1877) through to The Yeomen of the Guard (1888). Grossmith had composed hundreds of songs and duets for his own private drawing-room entertainments, as well as a few short comic operas, but never a full-length work as ambitious as Haste to the Wedding.

By opening night, 27 July 1892, Gilbert was approaching a reconciliation with Sullivan, who was in attendance. Notable among the cast were Frank Wyatt as Woodpecker Tapping, veteran actor Lionel Brough (Pietro in The Mountebanks) as Maguire, and George Grossmith Jr., the composer's son, in his stage debut as Foodle. The opera was not a success, however, playing only 22 performances. Stedman suggests that the timing of the premiere in July, traditionally a slow season, worked against it.

The writer Kurt Gänzl sums up the failure:

...the setting of the lyrics proved rather too much for Grossmith, whose musical talent, though tuneful and amusing, was definitely on the small scale. The songs added nothing to the play and indeed, by breaking down the plot and slowing the pell-mell pace of the action, exposed the improbability of the situations. After a first night which evoked some wrathful comments from a disappointed audience, Haste to the Wedding survived only twenty-two performances.

At Chichester (1975) and Exeter (1976), an adaptation was created using Gilbert's The Wedding March as a starting point, adding the lyrics and music from Haste to the Wedding, as well as additional original lyrics written to music adapted from Jacques Offenbach’s Barbe-Bleue. This piece was called The Italian Straw Hat and played strongly for limited seasons.

== Roles and 1892 cast ==
- Woodpecker Tapping, a Bridegroom – Frank Wyatt
- Mr. Maguire, a Market Gardener – Lionel Brough
- Uncle Bopaddy – William Blakely
- Cousin Foodle – George Grossmith Jr.
- The Duke of Turniptopshire, an Emotional Peer – David James
- Major-General Bunthunder – Sidney Valentine
- Captain Bapp – Frank Atherley
- Cripps, a Milliner's Bookkeeper – Welton Dale
- Wilkinson, a Policeman – Percy Brough
- Barns, a Family Retainer – Fred Bond
- Jackson, a Valet – W. R. Shirley
- The Marchioness of Market Harborough, an Emotional Peeress – Ellis Jeffreys
- Maria Maguire, a Bride – Marie Studholme
- Leonora – Day Ford
- Bella Crackenthorpe, a Milliner – Sybil Carlisle
- Patty Parker, a Lady's Maid – Haidee Crofton

Chorus of Wedding Guests and Members of the Upper Aristocracy

Note: Captain Bapp and Leonora are omitted in the dramatis personæ of the published libretto, although they appear in the text itself.

== Synopsis ==
=== Act I ===
==== Scene 1: A room in Woodpecker Tapping's house. ====
It is Woodpecker Tapping's wedding day. Jackson, the valet, explains to Patty that the bride, Miss Maria Maguire, lives in a remote corner of Wales, and as Woodpecker cannot get leave to travel that far, Maria and her family must come to him. Woodpecker's Uncle Bopaddy arrives with a wedding gift, which he gives to Patty for safekeeping. Woodpecker comes in to tell his uncle about a strange incident that had happened in Hyde Park. His horse bolted, and when he caught up with the animal, it was chewing on a lady's straw hat. Woodpecker paid the lady a shilling for her damaged hat. Uncle Bopaddy remarks that the hat is curiously similar to his wedding gift.

Left alone, Woodpecker remarks that he is delighted with his bride-to-be, but that her father is a "human porcupine." He is also exasperated with her foppish cousin Foodle, who is allowed to kiss her, even though Woodpecker may not. Leonora, the lady whose hat Woodpecker's horse had chewed up, arrives with Captain Bapp, her cousin. Woodpecker apologises to them, and offers more money, but they insist he must replace the hat, as Leonora's husband is insanely jealous and won't forgive her if she returns without it. Woodpecker promises to find a replacement from a local milliner. In the meantime, he insists they hide, as it would be awkward if his bride and father-in-law discover another woman in the house.

The rest of the wedding party arrive. Maguire says that the wedding is off, because Woodpecker has kept them waiting outside, and he declares that Maria will marry Foodle. After Woodpecker apologises, Maguire says that he can marry Maria after all. Woodpecker needs an excuse to stop at a milliner's shop on the way to the registrar, so he tells them that he's lost the marriage license. Maguire once again calls the wedding off but is pacified when Woodpecker says that they'll stop off at a Doctor's Commons and get a new license. Woodpecker observes that the bride's family are country people and won't know the difference between a Doctor's Commons and a milliner's shop.

==== Scene 2: A Milliner's Show-room ====
Bella, the milliner, recognises Woodpecker, who had once proposed marriage and then abandoned her; he insists that he still intends to abide by his promise. Bella agrees to give him a fine straw hat, provided that he takes her to lunch that afternoon and to the theatre that evening. He agrees, and she leaves to go fetch the hat.

The wedding party enters, having grown impatient. They believe they are in a Doctor's Commons. When Cripps, the milliner's bookkeeper, enters, they mistake him for the Registrar, and confusion ensues as they try to dictate their names to him as if to obtain a marriage license. Foodle observes Woodpecker embracing Bella in an adjoining room. Maguire again cancels the wedding, and gives Maria to Foodle. Woodpecker says that Bella is his cousin, and the wedding is on again. Cripps leaves, and the wedding party pursue him. Bella tells Woodpecker that she can't match the kind of straw hat that he is looking for, and she cannot get another one like it for three weeks. The only matching hat she's seen in London is a specimen she sold to the Marchioness of Market Harborough. Woodpecker resolves that he must visit the Marchioness to persuade her to part with her hat. Cripps re-enters, breathless, followed by the wedding party, who still believe he is the Registrar.

=== Act II ===
==== Scene 1: A handsomely furnished drawing-room ====
The Duke of Turniptopshire arrives at the Marchioness of Market Harborough's home for a concert by the Italian falsetto singer, Nisnardi. The Duke remarks that he would far prefer to be a commonplace man than a "highly-strung sensitive Duke". Woodpecker arrives. He and Maria are now married, and the wedding party are waiting in carriages outside. He has told them that the Marchioness's home is St. James's Hall, and that he is inside making arrangements for the wedding breakfast. The Duke mistakes Woodpecker for the Italian singer and goes off to tell her that Nisnardi has arrived.

The Marchioness enters, and likewise assumes that Woodpecker is Nisnardi. He asks if she received his note. She replies that she did, and presents Woodpecker with a flower. He says that it is not a flower, but an article of her attire that he wants. When she quotes from Nisnardi's note, Woodpecker realises the confusion, but before he can explain, the Marchioness's guests arrive for the concert. Playing along, Woodpecker tells them that his voice has deserted him, but he will be able to sing if the Marchioness indulges his whim – he wants her straw hat. Maguire enters, rather tipsy. The Marchioness takes him to be Nisnardi's accompanist. She escorts him to meet her guests. Her maid enters with a hat-box, but when Woodpecker opens it, he finds it is a black hat. The maid explains that the Marchioness gave her white straw hat to her niece, Mrs. Major-General Bunthunder.

Woodpecker resolves to visit the Major-General's home at once, but the Duke stops him before he can leave. Woodpecker claims that he had left his tuning fork behind and was going home to fetch it. The Marchioness's guests insist that he start singing. Maguire tries to play the piano. The rest of the wedding party burst in and start eating the Marchioness's food. The Marchioness faints into the Duke's arms, and Woodpecker escapes.

=== Act III ===
==== Scene 1: Dressing-room in Major-General Bunthunder's House ====
The Major-General is soaking his feet in a hot bath. He has never fought in battle, but remarks that he would perform heroic deeds if he were asked to do so. His wife, Leonora, has been gone all day, and he wonders if she is deceiving him. Woodpecker arrives and explains the aftermath of the Marchioness's concert. Bunthunder wonders why Woodpecker is telling him this irrelevant story. Woodpecker asks to see Bunthunder's wife. He says that she is "not at home", but Woodpecker goes downstairs looking for her, putting up a screen around Bunthunder and his foot bath. Bunthunder shouts that he will go after Woodpecker as soon as he is dressed.

Maguire enters, believing the house to be Woodpecker's. His boots are hurting him, and when he sees Bunthunder's boots, he switches them with his own. He then goes to let in the wedding party. Uncle Bopaddy enters, and Bunthunder assumes that his home is under assault. He hears the tumult and rushes downstairs, wearing Maguire's ill-fitting boots. Maguire returns with the wedding party. Maguire assumes that Woodpecker is getting dressed behind the screen and advises him that if he wants a happy marriage, "In all things give into your wife." They leave.

Woodpecker has found several hats, but none matching the damaged one. Bunthunder confronts him, assuming he is a burglar. Woodpecker explains the need for the hat. Bunthunder is at first amused, until he realises that it is his own wife's straw hat that Woodpecker's horse had ruined. He vows to take his case to court.

==== Scene 2: A street near Woodpecker's house ====
Maguire and Maria wonder why Woodpecker keeps giving them the slip. Having finally ascertained that they've found Woodpecker's house, they knock on the door. Jackson, the valet, tells them that they cannot come in, because "the lady without a hat" is still inside. Maguire is astonished to hear that another lady is in the house. Vowing to get Maria a divorce and marry her to Foodle, he orders Jackson to retrieve all the wedding gifts. Woodpecker arrives and admits that Leonora is in the house. Jackson returns with the presents. Maguire tells everyone to grab a present and head for the train station. Uncle Bopaddy urges them to be careful, because his gift is a delicate straw hat. Woodpecker frantically opens the hat-box; the hat is identical to the one his horse had eaten. He rushes inside to find Leonora.

Police Officer Wilkinson enters and assumes that all of the presents are stolen property. He arrests the whole wedding party and ushers them into the station-house. Woodpecker returns with Leonora and Captain Bapp, but the hat is gone. Bunthunder is fast approaching, and Leonora does not want him to find her with Woodpecker. Thinking quickly, Woodpecker tells Officer Wilkinson that Leonora is drunk and disorderly. She and Bapp are arrested and taken to the station-house. Bunthunder arrives at Woodpecker's house in a fury. Captain Bapp tosses the hat out of a window of the station-house, but it lands on a lamp-post, just out of reach. Bunthunder, not finding Leonora, concludes that his accusation of Woodpecker was unjust. Woodpecker tries to use his umbrella to dislodge the hat without arousing Bunthunder's suspicions.

Leonora and the wedding party return from the police station. Maguire has bribed the Chief Inspector, and they are cleared of wrongdoing. One of the wedding guests manages to retrieve the hat, and Leonora claims it. She tells her husband that she had been waiting for him all day at her aunt's. Everyone is reconciled. Woodpecker and Maria go into the house together.

== Musical numbers ==
Act I

- No.1. Patty and Jackson (Today, at eleven)
- No.2. Woodpecker (Maria is simple and chaste)
- No.3. Chorus and Maguire (Ring, ye joybells, long and loudly... You've kept us all waiting outside!)
- No.4. Bella (By dreams of ample profit lured)
- No.5. Bella and Woodpecker (I want a hat of finest straw)
- No.6. Cripps and Maguire with Chorus (Gracious, how I have been running)

Act II

- No.7. Duke (Oh butcher, oh baker, oh candlestick-maker)
- No.8. Woodpecker and Marchioness (The slave of impulse I)
- No.9. Maguire with Chorus (Now, Woodpecker!... Why, we're all making merry)
- No.10. Finale: (Hurrah for the bride with a right good will)

Act III

- No.11. Bunthunder (Though called upon I've never been)
- No.12. Woodpecker and Bunthunder (Your pardon, sir... From the Marchionesses)
- No.13. Maguire with Chorus (If you value a peaceable life)
- No.14. Woodpecker and Bunthunder (I've come across hats of all colours and sorts)
- No.15. Finale: (Free, free! Hurrah!)
