= Marguerite Vaillant-Couturier =

French soprano (1855–1930)

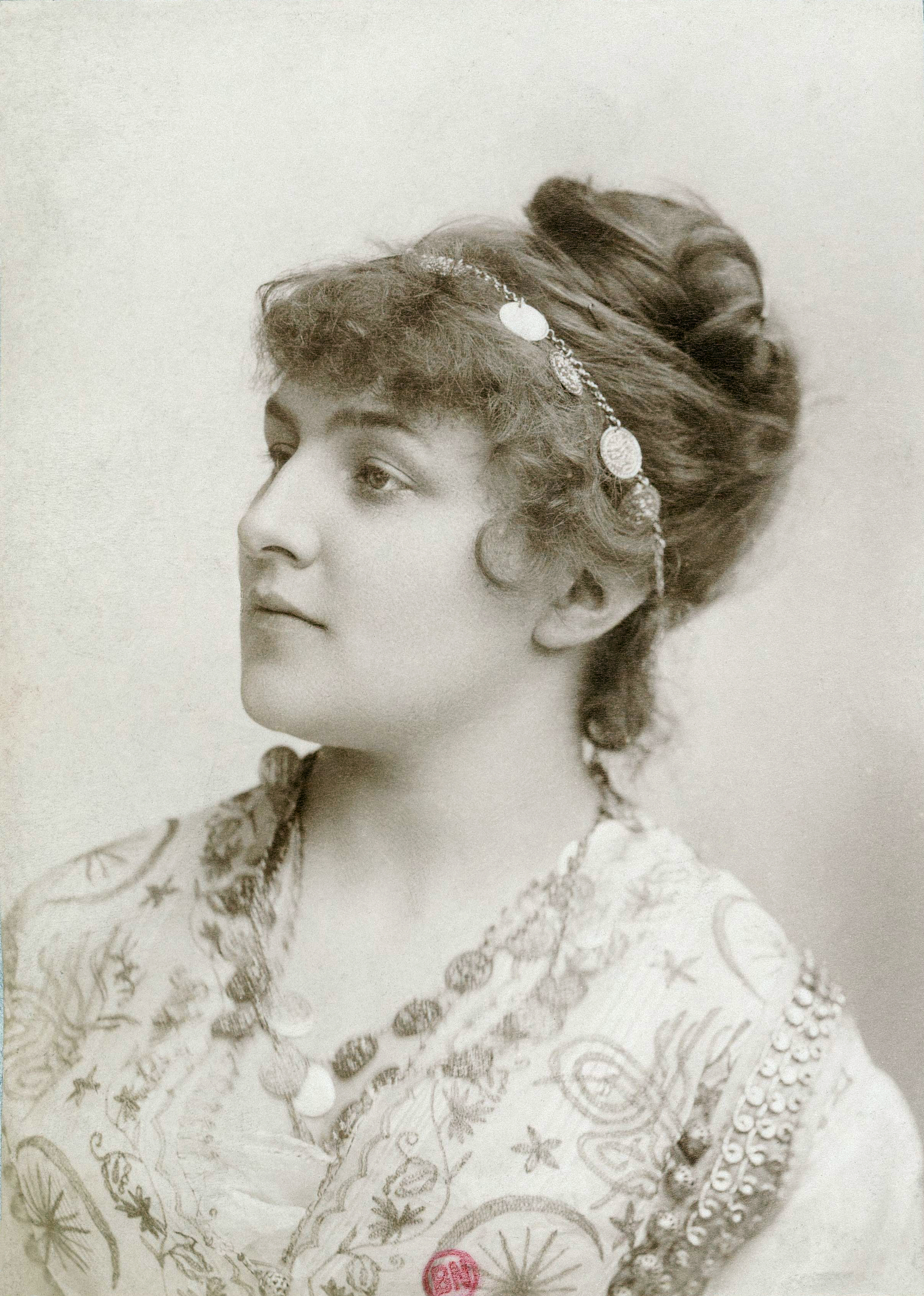
- Marguerite Vaillant-Couturier ca. 1875-1895
- Born: Marguerite Vaillant; 12 May 1855; Paris, French Empire
- Died: 1 May 1930 (aged 74); Paris, France
- Education: Conservatoire de Paris
- Occupation: Operatic soprano

Marguerite Vaillant-Couturier (12 May 1855 – 5 May 1930) was a French soprano who made her debut in Brussels at La Monnaie in 1880 in the title role of Gounod's Mireille. After appearing in Marseille the following year, she sang in operettas in Paris in the early 1880s. On 19 October 1882, she created the role of Micaëla in Lecocq's Le cœur et la main at the Théâtre des Nouveautés in Paris. In 1888, she gained success in the title role of Bizet's Carmen at the Opéra-Comique. She also appeared in Buenos Aires and Saint Petersburg.

== Early life, family and education ==
Born in Paris on 12 May 1855, Marguerite Vaillant was the daughter of the civil engineer Paul Louis Vaillant (1818–74) and his wife Caroline Adèle Emma née Isot (1829–97). One of the family's four children, she attended the Conservatoire de Paris where in 1878 she was awarded first prizes in singing for both opera and comic opera. On 22 February 1879 in Brussels, Marguerite Vaillant married the baritone Félix Couturier (1854–1914) with whom she had a son, Paul, who became a politician.

== Career ==
Vaillant made her debut in September 1878 at the Théâtre de la Monnaie in Brussels in the title role of Gounod's Mireille. As she had not made herself available to the Paris theatres under the terms of her conservatory prizes, she had to pay a fine of 20,000 francs to the French authorities. In Brussels, she appeared as Juliette in Roméo et Juliette, Catharina in Meyerbeer's L'étoile du nord and the title role of Victor Massé's Galathée before moving to Marseille where she was particularly successful in Offenbach's Madame Favart. She went on to sing in Nantes and Geneva.

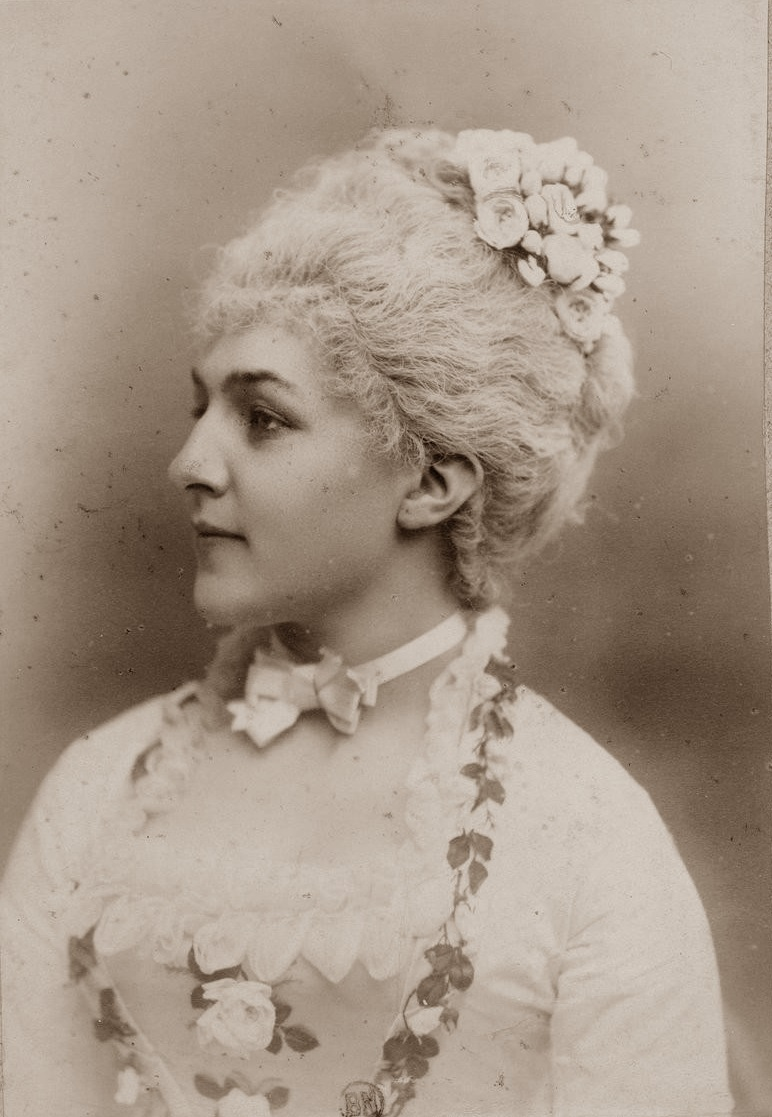
Marguerite Vaillant-Couturier as Micaëla in Le cœur et la main, 1882

On 19 October 1882 at the Théâtre des Nouveautés in Paris, she created the role of Micaëla in the world premiere of Lecocq's Le cœur et la main. Other roles created there included Benvenuta in Théodore Lajarte's Roi de Carreau (23 October 1883), and Elvérine in Louis Varney's operetta Babolin (19 March 1884). She returned to Brussels to sing the title role in the Belgian premiere of Massenet's Manon. While there, she appeared in Gounod's Faust and Hamlet by Ambroise Thomas.

In 1886, she appeared as a guest singer in Buenos Aires and in 1887 in Saint Petersburg. She returned to Paris to sing the title role in Bizet's Carmen in June 1888 at the Opéra-Comique where she went on to create the role of Thisbé de Montéfiori in the premiere of Henry Litolff's L'Escadron volant de la reine on 14 December 1888. The following year, she moved to Antwerp where she appeared as Baucis in Gounod's Philémon et Baucis, and again as Catharina and Galathée. In 1889, she appeared at the Monte-Carlo Opera as Philine in Thomas' Mignon and in the title role of Mireille.

Marguerite Vaillant-Couturier died in Paris on 1 May 1930 at the age of 74.
