= Geraldine Ulmar =

American opera singer and actress (1862–1932)

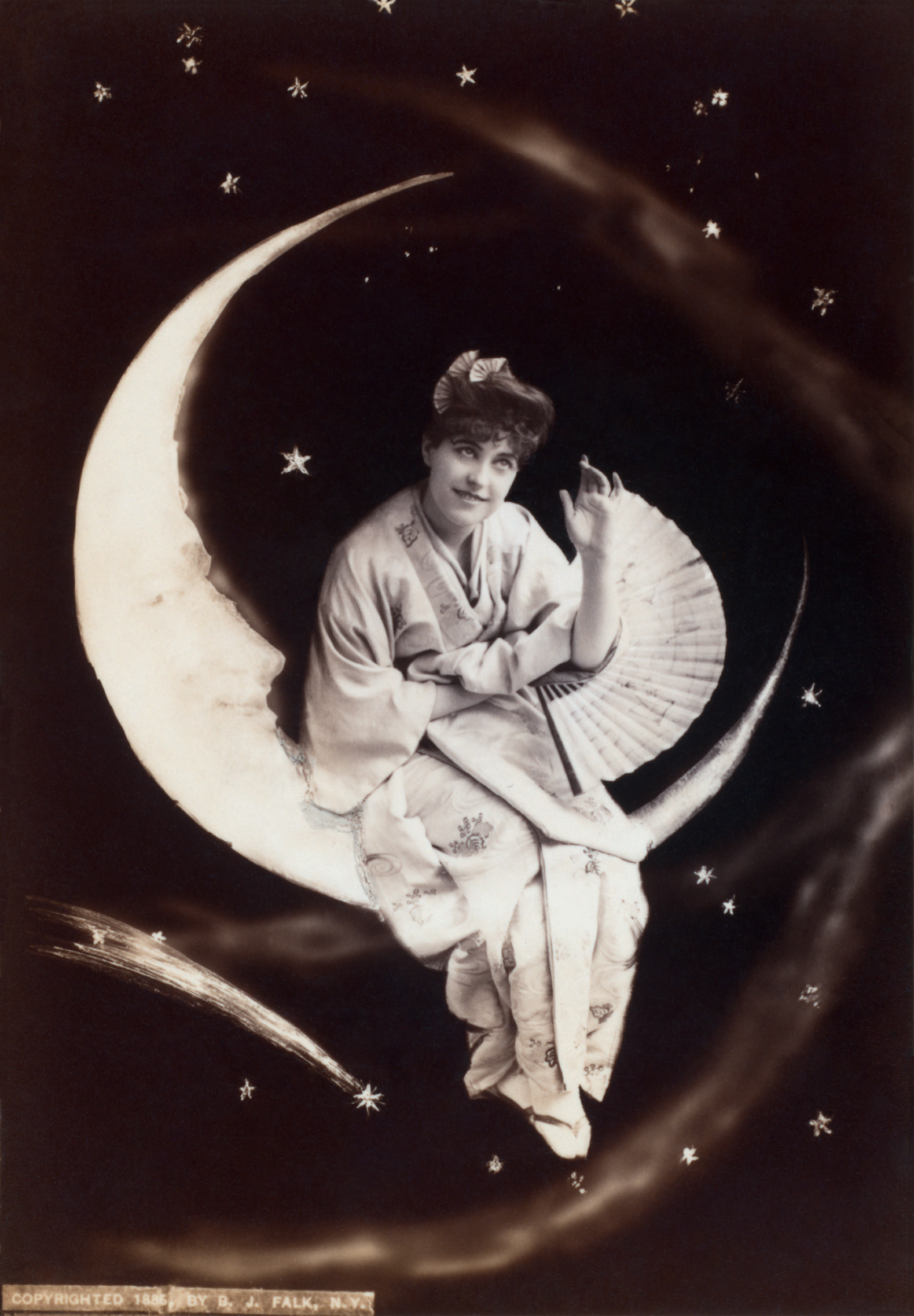
Ulmar as Yum-Yum in The Mikado, captioned "We're very wide awake, the moon and I."

Geraldine Ulmar (June 23, 1862 – August 13, 1932) was an American singer and actress best known for her performances in soprano roles of the Gilbert and Sullivan operas with the D'Oyly Carte Opera Company.

In 1879, Ulmar made her debut as Josephine in Gilbert and Sullivan's H.M.S. Pinafore in Boston and soon joined the Boston Ideal Opera Company, where she remained as leading soprano for six years. She next played Yum-Yum in the D'Oyly Carte Opera Company's first American production of The Mikado in New York, from 1885 to 1886 and the first Rose Maybud in Ruddigore in New York in 1887. She continued to play more Gilbert and Sullivan roles in New York, Germany and England. In London at the Savoy Theatre, Ulmar originated the leading characters of Elsie Maynard in The Yeomen of the Guard (1888) and Gianetta in The Gondoliers (1889) before leaving D'Oyly Carte in 1890. She remained in Britain to play leading roles in other works, such as O Mimosa San in the musical comedy The Geisha. She retired from the stage in 1904 and taught singing. Ulmar was married for a time to composer Ivan Caryll.

== Life and career ==
Annie Geraldine Ulmar was born in Charlestown, Massachusetts. She began singing in amateur concerts as a child.

=== Ideal Opera and D'Oyly Carte years ===
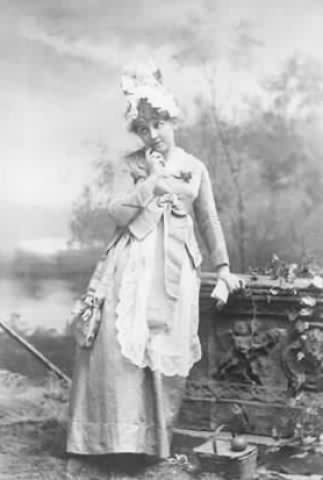
Ulmar as Rose in Ruddigore

In 1879, she made her professional debut in the role of Josephine in Gilbert and Sullivan's H.M.S. Pinafore, aboard a ship in a lake in Boston's Oakland Garden. She soon joined the Boston Ideal Opera Company and remained with the company as leading soprano for the next six years, singing roles in The Marriage of Figaro, The Bohemian Girl, Fra Diavolo, Giralda ou La nouvelle psyché by Adolphe Adam, The Chimes of Normandy, Fatinitza, Giroflé-Girofla, Czar and Carpenter, and in Gilbert and Sullivan operas.

Ulmar next was hired to play Yum-Yum in the D'Oyly Carte Opera Company's first American production of The Mikado, at the Fifth Avenue Theatre in New York, from 1885 to 1886, in a cast that included George Thorne (Ko-Ko), Courtice Pounds (Nanki-Poo), and Fred Billington (Pooh-Bah). She joined a D'Oyly Carte touring company in England, singing Yum-Yum and Josephine for a few months, then Yum-Yum in the German company, before returning to America in the summer of 1886. D'Oyly Carte released her to play for an American manager, John Stetson, at the end of 1886, for whom she played in Carte-approved productions in New York of Princess Ida (in the title role) and The Mikado (as Yum-Yum) and then in Boston in the title role of Patience.

In early 1887, Ulmar rejoined the D'Oyly Carte Opera Company in England, where she rehearsed the new Gilbert and Sullivan opera, Ruddygore (later renamed Ruddigore), played Rose Maybud in two matinee performances at the Savoy Theatre, and then returned to New York to play Rose in the American production. In May 1887, she returned to London to play Rose at the Savoy and remained there to play the soprano roles in the 1888 London revivals of Pinafore, The Pirates of Penzance (Mabel) and The Mikado. The Times wrote, in 1887, that

"[S]he is born to the manner of the peculiar form of art invented by [Gilbert and Sullivan]. Her voice, although not very powerful, is quite capable of dealing with the composer's short-skirted airs, and the occasional dose of sentiment ... is quite within her reach.... Miss Ulmar’s style must be called a little prononcé. Her accents in the music, her treatment of the dialogue, and most of all, her by-play, are coloured a trifle more highly than is altogether compatible with the very subdued and refined tone of the general picture, which forms one of the most attractive features of the genre. At the same time she eschews any approach to vulgarity".

Ulmar originated the leading soprano roles of Elsie Maynard in The Yeomen of the Guard (1888), and Gianetta in The Gondoliers (1889) before leaving D'Oyly Carte in 1890.

=== Later years ===
as Elsie in The Yeomen of the Guard

She remained in London to play Marton in La Cigale (1890–1891) by Edmond Audran and F. C. Burnand, and next appeared as Teresa in W. S. Gilbert and Alfred Cellier's The Mountebanks (1892) and Guinevere Block in Little Christopher Columbus (1893–1894). Beginning in 1896, she toured as O Mimosa San in The Geisha with George Edwardes's touring company. Her last stage role was Jane Jingle in Ladyland (1904). Ulmar then turned to teaching singing. Some of her students became well known, including José Collins and Evelyn Laye.

For part of the 1890s, she was married to composer Ivan Caryll. She died in Merstham, Surrey, England, in 1932, at the age of 70.
