= Violet Melnotte =

British stage performer, actress-manager and theatre owner

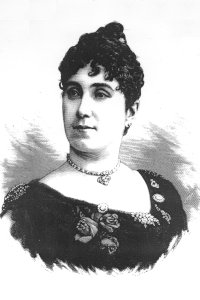
Violet Melnotte in about 1892

Violet Melnotte (2 May 1855 – 17 September 1935), was a British stage performer, actress-manager and theatre owner of the late 19th century and early 20th century. She was the wife of Gilbert and Sullivan performer Frank Wyatt, whom she met when they both appeared in the hit operetta Erminie.

Melnotte performed in comic opera and pantomime in London and the British provinces for eight years before venturing into theatre management in 1885. After this, she continued to perform while managing several West End theatres. She and her husband built the Duke of York's Theatre in 1892, and she owned the theatre for four decades. In 1910 she built the Duke of York's Picture House in Brighton, a state-of-the-art facility.

== Early life and career ==
Born in Birmingham in 1855 as Emma Solomon, the daughter of Henry Solomon (born 1831), a general dealer, and later a traveller in jewellery, and his wife Ellen (née Coley), in 1872 she married Thomas Hopkins in Birmingham and had a daughter, Ellen 'Nellie' (born c. 1876).

Melnotte made her professional debut in a pantomime at the Theatre Royal in Hull in the mid-1870s. She made her London debut in October 1876 as Fezz in Bluebeard at the Folly Theatre. In early 1877 Melnotte appeared as a Tittlebat-fisher in Richard D'Oyly Carte's operetta Happy Hampstead at the Royalty Theatre.

She performed in comic opera and pantomime in London and the British provinces for eight years before venturing into theatre management with the Avenue Theatre in 1885. She was manager of the Comedy Theatre when her Miss Violet Melnotte's Comic Opera Company launched the original British production of Edward Jakobowski's comic opera Erminie (1885), which went on to become an international sensation. Melnotte played the role of Cerise Marcel in the production.

In 1886 she secured the British rights to Ivan Caryll's first theatre piece, Lily of Léoville, which she also presented at the Comedy Theatre and appeared in as Turlurette. In the same year she married the future D'Oyly Carte Opera Company actor Frank Wyatt.

== Later years ==
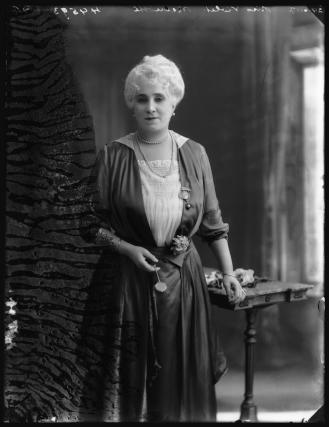
Violet Melnotte in 1918

Melnotte managed Toole's Theatre and produced plays at the Royalty Theatre, while at the same time she and Wyatt were building the Duke of York's Theatre in London. It opened on 10 September 1892 as the Trafalgar Square Theatre, with Wedding Eve, and Melnotte retained ownership of this theatre until her death in 1935, with the exception of a five-year gap from 1928 to 1933. The theatre became known as the Trafalgar Theatre in 1894 and the following year became the Duke of York's to honour the future King George V.

In 1910 she built the Duke of York's Picture House in Brighton, at a cost of £3000; it boasted all the latest amenities and comforts. In April 1918 she sold the cinema to Jack Channon, the director of Sussex Picturedromes Ltd. With Wyatt she had a son, Nevill Francis Gunning Wyatt (1890–1933), and a daughter, Rita Dagmar Wyatt (born 1891).

In 1934, aged 79, she was briefly engaged to the 31-year-old Archibald Patrick Moore, the general manager at the Duke of York's Theatre. There was such a public outcry over the difference in their ages she considered adopting him instead so that he could inherit the theatre on her death, all her children having predeceased her. Eventually, neither marriage nor adoption went ahead.

In her final years, Melnotte lived at the Piccadilly Hotel in London and the Hotel Metropole in Brighton. She died in London in 1935 aged 80.
