= Frank Wyatt =

English actor, singer, theatre manager and playwright (1852–1926)

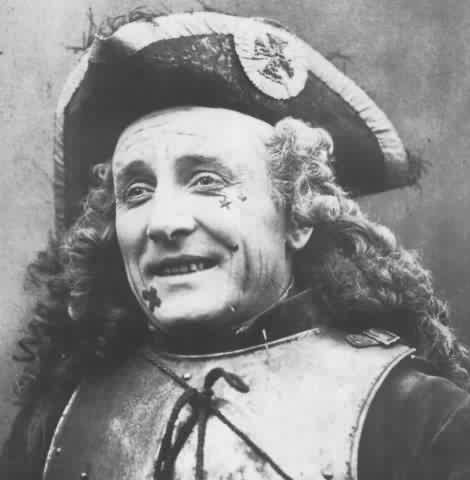
Wyatt as the Duke of Plaza-Toro in The Gondoliers (1889)

Frank Wyatt (7 November 1852 – 5 October 1926) was an English actor, singer, theatre manager and playwright.

After beginning his career as an illustrator and painter, in 1877 Wyatt began a stage career in comedy, Victorian burlesque, pantomime and operetta. In 1884 he had success in a Shakespeare role in Henry Irving's company, and in 1885 he created the role of Ravennes in the comic opera Erminie, which went on to become an international sensation. In this production he met Violet Melnotte, who also appeared in Erminie and who managed the theatre where it premiered; they married in 1886.

In his more than two-decade career on stage Wyatt is best remembered for his roles with the D'Oyly Carte Opera Company from 1889 to 1891, and in particular for creating the role of the Duke of Plaza-Toro in Gilbert and Sullivan's hit comic opera The Gondoliers. Wyatt continued to perform in comic operas and comedies until about 1900. From the 1890s Wyatt and his wife owned and managed the Trafalgar Square Theatre, known after 1895 as the Duke of York's Theatre. He also wrote plays and a grand opera.

== Early life and career ==
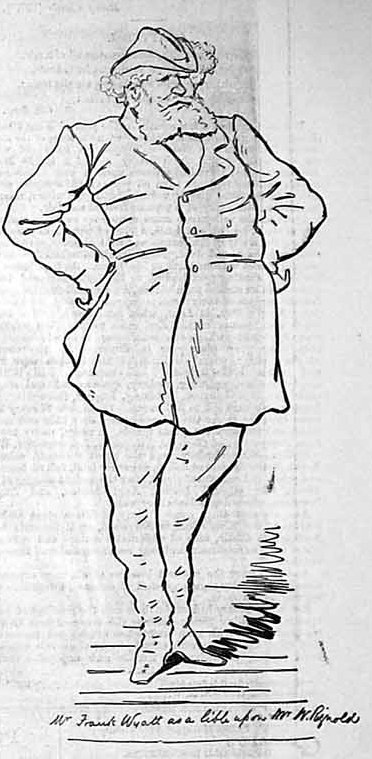
Wyatt as William Rignold in Another Drink (1879)

Wyatt was born Francis Nevill Gunning in Greenwich in London, the son of Thomas Wyatt Gunning (1813–1884), a barrister, and Lucy Latour (née Jenkins; 1819–1858). He was christened on 29 December 1852 in St Alfege church in Greenwich. His sisters were Charlotte Augusta Gunning (1851–1927) and Lucy Matilda Constance Gunning (1858–1871). He studied art at the Royal Academy, became an illustrator on the Illustrated Sporting and Dramatic News and successfully exhibited and sold paintings.

In 1877 Wyatt began a stage career in a one-line part in the farce On Bail by W. S. Gilbert at the Criterion Theatre, where he continued to play in farces for three years under the management of Charles Wyndham. Over the next two decades, Wyatt appeared regularly before London audiences in burlesques at the Gaiety Theatre, London, and character roles in plays and operettas in various West End theatres. In 1879 he appeared with Selina Dolaro in the "melodramatic burlesque" Another Drink at the Folly Theatre, caricaturing William Rignold and dancing a can-can with Dolaro.

In 1880 he played Punch in the pantomime Mother Goose and the Enchanted Beauty at Drury Lane Theatre with Arthur Roberts and Kate Santley. In 1884 he was praised for "by far the best piece of comic character-drawing" in creating his role of Captaine Coqueluche in H. B. Farnie's adaptation of Edmond Audran's opéra bouffe The Grand Mogul, starring Florence St. John, Fred Leslie and Roberts. Also in 1884 he had a success in a Shakespeare role in Henry Irving's company, playing Andrew Aguecheek in Twelfth Night at the Lyceum Theatre, London.

In 1885 he created the role of Ravennes in the popular comic opera Erminie, with music by Edward Jakobowski, at the Comedy Theatre in London, then under the management of Violet Melnotte, whom Wyatt married in London the following year. He appeared in the 1888 burlesque of Atalanta at the Strand Theatre with Willie Warde and Tom Squire.

== D'Oyly Carte and later theatre career ==
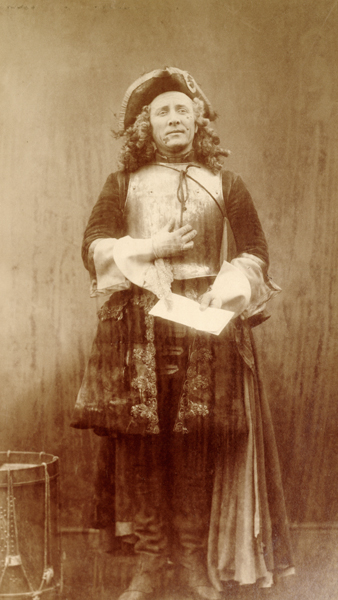
Wyatt as the Duke of Plaza-Toro in The Gondoliers 1889

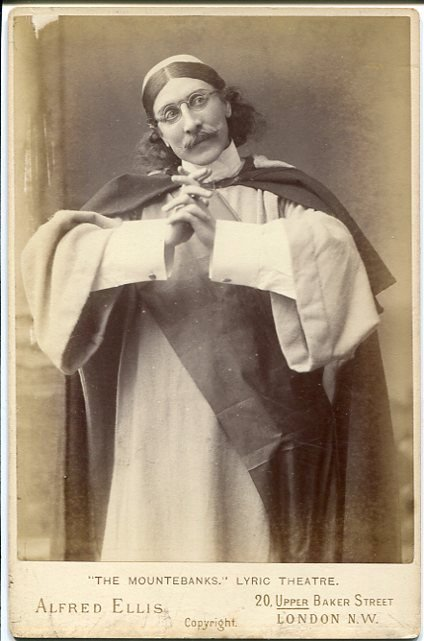
Wyatt as Arrostino Annegato in The Mountebanks 1892

On 8 June 1889, W. S. Gilbert visited Arthur Sullivan at his home in London to read through the draft of their new opera, The Gondoliers. In the evening they both went to see Wyatt performing the role of Don Trocadero in the opéra comique Paul Jones, in which he had received good notices, as they were looking for a replacement for their long-time leading comedian, George Grossmith, who was leaving the D'Oyly Carte Opera Company in August. Satisfied by what they had seen, they invited Wyatt to join the D'Oyly Carte company on a two-year contract to create the role of the Duke of Plaza-Toro at the Savoy Theatre in The Gondoliers. Wyatt appeared in the role throughout the run of 554 performances, from December 1889 to June 1891. Punch said of his performance: "Mr. Frank Wyatt, as 'the new boy' at the Savoy School, doesn't, as yet, seem quite happy; but it cannot be expected that he should feel 'quite at home', when he has only recently arrived at a new school." H. M. Walbrook recalled, however, that Wyatt was "a tall, handsome, nimble and very polished comedian, who immediately acted, sang and danced the part of the Duke of Plaza Toro as it has never been rendered since."

Wyatt next created the role of Baboo Currie in The Nautch Girl by Dance and Solomon, playing the part from June to December 1891, when his contract with D'Oyly Carte ended. From January to July 1892 he appeared at the Lyric Theatre as Arrostino Annegato in The Mountebanks by Gilbert and Alfred Cellier. Wyatt's reviews describe his effectiveness in the songs allotted to him. He then played Woodpecker Tapping in Haste to the Wedding, a short-lived comic opera by Gilbert and George Grossmith at the Criterion Theatre. Also in 1892, he appeared in London in Ma mie Rosette, together with Jessie Bond and Courtice Pounds. On tour, Wyatt appeared in Mam'zelle Nitouche in 1893. Later that year, he returned to London in a farce called A Screw Loose at the Vaudeville Theatre. In 1896, Wyatt was seen in The Star of India at Princess's Theatre, London. He appeared in The Mermaids and other pieces in 1897 at the Avenue Theatre. His appearances became fewer after this, although he performed in new works as late as 1900 in The Gay Pretenders by George Grossmith, Jr. at the Globe Theatre.

== Writing and theatre management ==
Wyatt also wrote a number of plays, the best known being The Two Recruits (1890) and Our Regiment, both of which were produced at Toole's Theatre under the management of his wife. He also wrote a grand opera called Galatea that was produced by the Carl Rosa Opera Company. In 1892, the Trafalgar Square Theatre (renamed the Duke of York's Theatre in 1895) was built for Melnotte and Wyatt and was managed by them thereafter (except for a few years after Wyatt's death) until her death in 1935. Wyatt and Melnotte had a son, Nevill Francis Gunning Wyatt (1890–1933), and a daughter, Rita Dagmar Wyatt (born 1891).

Wyatt's half sister was Ivy Bonheur, a principal soprano with D'Oyly Carte touring companies in 1887–88, whose birth name was Eveline Medora Gunning.

Wyatt died in St. Peter's Nursing Home in Streatham in 1926 at the age of 73. In his will he left £6406 6s 3d to his son Nevill.
