= The Mountebanks =

Comic opera by W. S. Gilbert, Alfred Cellier and Ivan Caryll

Poster for The Mountebanks

The Mountebanks is a comic opera in two acts with music by Alfred Cellier and Ivan Caryll and a libretto by W. S. Gilbert. The story concerns a magic potion that causes the person to whom it is administered to become what he or she has pretended to be. It is similar to several "magic lozenge" plots that Gilbert had proposed to the composer Arthur Sullivan, but that Sullivan had rejected, earlier in their careers. To set his libretto to music, Gilbert turned to Cellier, who had previously been a musical director for Gilbert and Sullivan and had since become a successful composer. During the composition of the piece Cellier died, and the score was finished by the original production's musical director, Ivan Caryll, who became a successful composer of Edwardian Musical Comedy.

The opera was first produced at the Lyric Theatre, London, on 4 January 1892, for a run of 229 performances. It also toured extensively, had a short Broadway run, in 1893, American tours and Australian productions. The original cast included Geraldine Ulmar, Frank Wyatt, Lionel Brough, Eva Moore and Furneaux Cook. The American cast included Hayden Coffin and Lillian Russell. A professional recording of the work was released in 2018.

== Background ==
The story of the opera revolves around a magic potion that transforms those who drink it into whoever, or whatever, they pretend to be. The idea was clearly important to Gilbert, as he repeatedly urged his famous collaborator, Arthur Sullivan, to set this story, or a similar one, to music. For example, he had written a treatment of the opera in 1884, which Sullivan rejected, both because of the story's mechanical contrivance, and because they had already produced an opera concerning a magic potion, The Sorcerer (1877); Sullivan felt that the story lacked "human emotion". The idea of a magic potion that changes human behaviour has long been a common theme of literature and opera. The device allows Gilbert to explore "how people behave when they are forced to live with the consequences of their own actions", and how much control people really have over their own thoughts and feelings.

The Gilbert and Sullivan partnership and their Savoy operas dominated the London musical stage from the late 1870s to 1890. When that partnership temporarily disbanded, due to a quarrel over finances after the production of The Gondoliers, Gilbert sought another composer who would collaborate on the "magic lozenge" idea that Sullivan had rejected. He eventually found a willing partner in Alfred Cellier, a logical choice for Gilbert. The two had collaborated once before (Topsyturveydom, 1874), and Cellier had been the musical director for Gilbert and Sullivan's early operas. Cellier had also achieved much success apart from Gilbert and Sullivan, particularly with his comic opera Dorothy (1886), a smash hit. It played for over 900 performances, considerably more than The Mikado, Gilbert and Sullivan's most successful piece. Dorothy set and held the record for longest-running piece of musical theatre in history until the turn of the century.

=== Composition ===
Gilbert and Cellier agreed to collaborate on The Mountebanks in July 1890, and Gilbert began fleshing out the libretto, but unlike his usual daily interactions with Sullivan during development of a libretto, he found Cellier to be far less responsive. He was annoyed when Cellier sailed for Australia in mid-December without having responded to Gilbert's repeated queries about potential conflicts between some plot changes that he had suggested and an opera that Cellier was planning with the librettist B. C. Stephenson, The Black Mask, including a Spanish setting involving guerillas during the Peninsular War. Gilbert then completed the first act assuming that there were no conflicts. He finally received a response from Cellier by early January, stating that Gilbert's change in the setting of The Mountebanks from Sicily to Spain would indeed conflict with The Black Mask; Gilbert replied that he was ending the collaboration, and that Horace Sedger, the manager and lessee of London's Lyric Theatre, where the piece was to be produced, agreed with this. In early February, Gilbert approached the composer Arthur Goring Thomas to set the libretto to music, and Thomas sketched out music to four musical numbers. For unknown reasons, possibly Thomas's poor health, he never set the opera; when Cellier returned to England in April 1891, he sought, through his and Gilbert's mutual friend, Edward Chappell, to mend fences with Gilbert, and, after some flattery, succeeded. Gilbert changed his setting back to Sicily, and the guerillas again became brigands; it turned out that The Black Mask was never produced.

Cellier suffered from tuberculosis for most of his adult life, but during the composition of The Mountebanks he deteriorated rapidly and died, at the age of 47, while the opera was still in rehearsals. All of the melodies and vocal lines in the opera were composed by Cellier, but the orchestration was incomplete when he died. The score was completed by the Lyric Theatre's musical director, Ivan Caryll, a successful composer who became one of the best-known composers of Edwardian Musical Comedy. Caryll composed the entr'acte, using the melody from Number 16, and he wrote or modified the orchestration for more than half a dozen of the songs. He chose the 4th movement of Cellier's 1878 orchestral piece, the Suite Symphonique, to use as the opera's overture. One song whose lyrics were printed in the libretto available on the first night were never set to music, and another was cut before the opening night. After Cellier's illness prevented him from finishing the score, Gilbert modified the libretto around the gaps, and the order of some of the music was changed.

== Productions and recordings ==
"Put a penny in the slot" – Harry Monkhouse and Aida Jenoure in the original production

The Mountebanks's initial run of 229 performances surpassed most of Gilbert's later works and even a few of his collaborations with Sullivan. Gilbert engaged his old friends John D'Auban, to choreograph the piece, and Percy Anderson, to design costumes. The initial run closed on 5 August 1892. Despite the opera's warm reception, Gilbert wrote on 7 January 1892, shortly after the premiere, "I had to make rough & ready alterations to supply gaps – musical gaps – caused by poor Cellier's inability to complete his work. It follows that Act 2 stands out as a very poor piece of dramatic construction ... this is the worst libretto I have written. Perhaps I am growing old."

The success of the London production led its producer, Sedger, to establish at least three touring companies, which visited major towns and cities in Britain for a year and a half, from March 1892 to mid-November 1893. Louie René played Ultrice on one tour in 1893. While playing in Manchester, one touring company found itself competing with a D'Oyly Carte Opera Company touring company at a nearby theatre. The strained relations between Carte and Gilbert after The Gondoliers did not prevent the two companies from playing a cricket match in May 1892. Relations between Gilbert and his new producer had also deteriorated, and the author unsuccessfully sued Sedger for cutting the size of the chorus in the London production without his approval. It was toured for a year in America by the Lillian Russell Opera Company, starring Lillian Russell and C. Hayden Coffin, including a run of a month and a half at the Garden Theatre on Broadway, opening on 11 January 1893. It was also produced in Australia and New Zealand by the J. C. Williamson company until 1900.

Gilbert and Cellier's widow later sold the performing and score rental rights to the D'Oyly Carte Opera Company. Occasional amateur performances were staged in Britain, America and Australia until the Second World War, and the professional J. C. Williamson company continued to perform it occasionally in Australia and New Zealand. After that, the first known staging was in New York City, in 1955, in a small-scale production at the St. John's Theater, in Greenwich Village, by the Chamber Opera Players, accompanied only by a piano. It was produced in 1964 by the Washington, D.C., Lyric Theatre Company, with orchestra, and the company recorded the score. The Lyric Theatre company so damaged the orchestra parts that D'Oyly Carte stopped renting them out, and all further amateur performances could be accompanied only by piano until James Gillespie's Ramsgate production in 1982, which used orchestra parts that he copied from Australia.

A critical edition of the full score of the opera was published in 2014 by Robin Gordon-Powell, followed by a piano/vocal score. A 2015 production was staged in Palo Alto, California by Lyric Theatre, directed by John Hart, using Gordon-Powell's score. The score was finally recorded professionally and released in 2018 with the BBC Concert Orchestra conducted by John Andrews, garnering warm reviews for the conducting and performances. One reviewer noted Cellier's "fine lyrical detail and sumptuous orchestration with which he provides a wide variety of musical effects. … [O]ne is aware of the growing sophistication in Gilbert's choice of words in his lyrics during this mature period of his writing. Clever as some of the lyrics are they may well have gone over the heads of the 'comedy opera' orientated audiences."

== Roles and original cast ==
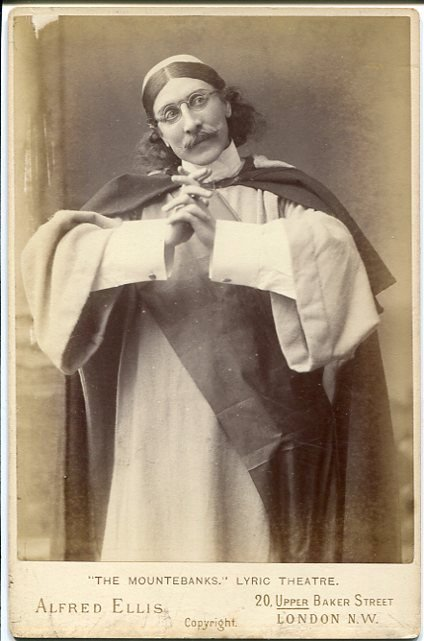
Frank Wyatt as Arrostino (1892)

- Arrostino Annegato, Captain of the Tamorras – a Secret Society (baritone) – Frank Wyatt
- Giorgio Raviolo, a Member of his Band (baritone) – Arthur Playfair
- Luigi Spaghetti, a Member of his Band (baritone) – Charles Gilbert
- Alfredo, a Young Peasant, loved by Ultrice, but in love with Teresa (tenor) – J. G. Robertson
- Pietro, Proprietor of a Troupe of Mountebanks (comic baritone) – Lionel Brough (later Cairns James)
- Bartolo, his Clown (baritone) – Harry Monkhouse
- Elvino di Pasta, an Innkeeper (bass-baritone) – Furneaux Cook
- Risotto, one of the Tamorras – just married to Minestra (tenor) – Cecil Burt
- Beppo – A member of the Mountebanks' crew (speaking) – Gilbert Porteous
- Teresa, a Village Beauty, loved by Alfredo, and in love with herself (soprano) – Geraldine Ulmar
- Ultrice, Elvino's niece, in love with, and detested by, Alfredo (contralto) – Lucille Saunders
- Nita, a Dancing Girl (mezzo-soprano or soprano) – Aida Jenoure
- Minestra, Risotto's Bride (mezzo-soprano) – Eva Moore
- Tamorras, Monks, Village Girls.

== Synopsis ==
=== Act I ===
Outside a mountain Inn on a picturesque Sicilian pass, a procession of Dominican monks sings a chorus (in Latin) about the inconveniences of monastic life. As soon as the coast is clear, the Tamorras appear. They are a secret society of bandits bent on revenge against the descendants of those who wrongly imprisoned an ancestor's friend five hundred years previously. The Tamorras tell Elvino, the innkeeper, that they are planning to get married – one man each day for the next three weeks. The first is Risotto, who is marrying Minestra later that day. Elvino asks them to conduct their revels in a whisper, so as not to disturb the poor old dying alchemist who occupies the second floor of the inn. Arrostino, the Tamorras's leader, has learned that the Duke and Duchess of Pallavicini will be passing through the village. He suggests that the Tamorras capture the monastery and disguise themselves as monks. Minestra will dress as an old woman and lure the Duke into the monastery, where he will be taken |captive and held for ransom.

Alfredo, a young peasant, is in love with Teresa, the village beauty. He sings a ballad about her, but it is clear that she does not love him in return. She suggests that he marry Elvino's niece, Ultrice, who follows Alfredo everywhere, but Alfredo wants nothing to do with Ultrice. Elvino is concerned that he does not know the proper protocol for entertaining a Duke and Duchess. He suggests that Alfredo impersonate a Duke, so that he can practice his manners. Alfredo implores Teresa to impersonate the Duchess, but Teresa insists that Ultrice play the role.

J. G. Robertson, Alfredo, as the Duke (1892)

A troupe of strolling players arrives. Their leader, Pietro, offers the villagers a dress rehearsal of a performance to be given later to the Duke and Duchess. Among the novelties to be presented, he promises "two world-renowned life-size clock-work automata, representing Hamlet and Ophelia". Nita and Bartolo, two of the troupe's members, were formerly engaged, but Nita became disenchanted with Bartolo's inability to play tragedy, and she is now engaged to Pietro. While they are discussing this, Beppo rushes in to tell Pietro that the clock-work automata have been detained at the border. Pietro wonders how his troupe will deliver the promised performance.

Elvino and Ultrice have a problem of their own. Their alchemist tenant has blown himself up while searching for the philosopher's stone, leaving six weeks' rent unpaid. All he has left behind is a bottle of "medicine" with a label on it. Believing the medicine to be useless, Elvino gives it to Pietro. Pietro reads the label and learns that the mysterious liquid "has the effect of making every one who drinks it exactly what he pretends to be". Pietro hatches the idea of administering the potion to Bartolo and Nita, who will pretend to be the clock-work Hamlet and Ophelia when the Duke and Duchess arrive. After the performance, Pietro can reverse the potion by burning the label. While preparing for the performance, Pietro accidentally drops the label, which Ultrice retrieves. Ultrice realises that if she and Alfredo drink the potion while they are pretending to be the Duke and Duchess, Alfredo's feigned love for her will become a reality.

Teresa, meanwhile, decides that, to taunt Alfredo, she will pretend to be in love with him, only to dash his hopes later on. Alfredo, who overhears this, declares that he will pretend to reject Teresa. When she learns this, Teresa says that she will feign insanity. By this point, all of the major characters are pretending to be something they are not. Alfredo pretends to be a Duke married to Ultrice and indifferent to Teresa. Ultrice pretends to be Duchess, married to Alfredo. Teresa pretends to be insane with love for Alfredo. Bartolo and Nita pretend to be clock-work Hamlet and Ophelia. The Tamorras pretend to be monks. Minestra pretends to be an old lady.

Alfredo and Ultrice appear in their guise as the faux Duke and Duchess. He proposes a toast, drawing wine from Pietro's wine-skin. Pietro, who has put the Alchemist's potion into the wine-skin, implores Alfredo to stop, telling him that it contains poison from which he is already dying. Alfredo ignores the warning and distributes the wine to everyone assembled.

=== Act II ===
The bandits, now monks, attempt to greet the Duke and Duchess (actually Alfredo and Ultrice) in song.

It is night-time outside the monastery. As the potion's label had foretold, everyone is now what they had pretended to be. Although Risotto and Minestra are married, he is disappointed to find that she is now an old woman of seventy-four (though her thoughts and feelings are unchanged). Teresa has gone completely mad with love for Alfredo. Bartolo and Nita are waxwork Hamlet and Ophelia, walking with mechanical gestures as if controlled by clockwork. Pietro, because he had pretended the wine was poisonous, is now dying slowly.

The Tamorras, who had pretended to be monks, have renounced their life of crime, and they no longer find the village girls attractive. They demand an explanation of Pietro, who explains that the wine was spiked. He promises to administer the antidote in an hour or two – as soon as Bartolo and Nita have performed for the Duke and Duchess. Alfredo, now pretending to be a Duke, greets the monks. They tell him that he has chosen a fortunate time for his arrival, as the Tamorras had planned to kidnap him. But now he is safe, as they are all virtuous monks.

Teresa is still crazed with love for Alfredo. He replies that, although he used to love her, he is now "married" to Ultrice and is blind to her charms. They are grateful that the charm will last for only another hour or so. Left alone, Ultrice admits that she alone has the antidote, and she has no intention of administering it. Pietro brings on Bartolo and Nita to entertain the Duke and Duchess, but he quickly recognises that his audience is only Alfredo and Ultrice. They explain that they are victims of a potion, and Pietro realises that the only solution to the mess is to administer the antidote. When he realises he has lost it, everyone accuses him of being a sorcerer. Bartolo and Nita discuss what it will be like to be Hamlet and Ophelia for the rest of their lives (her enchantment will compel her to drown herself, even though she doesn't want to do that). Pietro steals the keys, so that neither one can touch the other's clockwork.

Ultrice confronts Teresa and gloats over her triumph. However, when Teresa threatens to jump off a parapet, Ultrice relents and admits that she has stolen the antidote. Pietro seizes the label and burns it. The potion's effects expire, and the characters resume their original personalities, although some seem to have learned a lesson.

== Musical numbers ==
Overture: Fourth Movement of Cellier's Suite Symphonique

Act I

Lillian Russell as Teresa (1893)

- No. 1. "The chaunt of the Monks" and "We are members of a secret society" (Men's Chorus and Giorgio)
- No. 2. "Come, all the Maidens" (Chorus)
- No. 3. "If you Please" (Minestra and Risotto)
- No. 4. "Only think, a Duke and Duchess!" (Chorus and Minestra)
- No. 5. "High Jerry Ho!" (Arrostino and Male Chorus)
- No. 6. "Teresa, little Word" and "Bedecked in fashion Trim" (Alfredo)
- No. 7. "It's my Opinion" (Teresa)
- No. 8. "Upon my word, Miss" (Ultrice, Teresa, Alfredo and Elvino)
- No. 9. "Fair maid, take Pity" (Alfredo, Teresa, Ultrice and Elvino)
- No. 10. "Tabor and Drum" (Female Chorus, Pietro, Bartolo and Nita)
- No. 11. "Those days of Old" and "Allow that the plan I Devise" (Nita, with Bartolo and Pietro)
- No. 12. "Oh luck unequalled" ... "Alfredo Hers?" ... "When man in lovesick Passion" (Ultrice, Teresa and Alfredo)
- No. 13. "Finale Act I" (Ensemble)

Act II

- No. 14. "Entr'acte" (By Ivan Caryll)
- No. 15, "I'd be a young girl if I Could" (Minestra and Risotto)
- No. 16. "All alone to my Eerie" (Teresa)
- No. 17. "If I can catch this jolly Jack-Patch" (Teresa and Minestra)
- No. 18. "If our action's stiff and Crude" ... "Put a penny in the Slot" (Bartolo and Nita)
- No. 19. "Where gentlemen are eaten up with Jealousy ... Tic, Tic" (Bartolo, Nita and Pietro)
- No. 20. "Time there was when earthly Joy" (Chorus (with Soprano and Contralto solos), Arrostino and Pietro)
- No. 20a. OPTIONAL SONG: "When your clothes, from your hat to your Socks" (Pietro)^{1}
- No. 21. "The Duke and Duchess hither wend their Way" (Luigi, Arrostino, Alfredo and Chorus)
- No. 22. "Willow, willow, where's my Love?" (Teresa)
- No. 23. "In days gone By" (Alfredo, Teresa, and Ultrice)
- No. 24. "An hour? Nay, Nay." (Ultrice; this recit. – Ultrice's confession – was later moved to after No. 25)
- No. 25. "Oh, please you not to go Away" (Chorus, Pietro, Elvino, Alfredo, Ultrice, Bartolo, Nita)
- No. 26. "Ophelia was a dainty little Maid" (Pietro, Bartolo and Nita)
- No. 27. "Finale" (Ensemble)

^{1} The placement of this song changed within the act before it was cut from the original production. It is included on the only commercial recording of The Mountebanks. A revised version of the lyric was re-set by Sullivan for The Grand Duke by Gilbert and Sullivan as "When you find you’re a broken-down critter".

Gilbert (left) and Sedger caricatured, 1892

== Critical reception ==
At the first night, the audience's response was enthusiastic. The producer, Horace Sedger, came before the curtain at the end of the performance to explain that Gilbert preferred, because of the death of Cellier, not to take a curtain call.

Reviews for the libretto were consistently excellent. Cellier's music received mixed reviews. The Times noted with approval that Gilbert had returned to his favourite device of a magic potion, already seen in The Palace of Truth and The Sorcerer, and found the dialogue "crammed with quips of the true Gilbertian ring." The reviewer was more cautious about the score, attempting to balance respect for the recently dead Cellier with a clear conclusion that the music was derivative of the composer's earlier works and also of the Savoy operas. The Pall Mall Gazette thought the libretto so good that it "places Mr Gilbert so very far in advance of any living English librettist." The paper's critic was more emphatic about the score than his Times colleague, saying, "Mr Cellier's portion of the work is disappointing," adding that the composer never rose in this piece "to within measurable distance of his predecessor. ... If we judge the late Alfred Cellier's score by a somewhat high standard it is all Sir Arthur Sullivan's fault." The Era also noted Gilbert's reuse of old ideas, but asked, "who would wish Mr Gilbert to adopt a new style?" The paper thought equally well of the score, rating it as highly as Cellier's best-known piece, Dorothy. The Daily Telegraph called the music "accompaniment merely" but found it "completely satisfactory" as such. The Manchester Guardian considered the music "a triumph." All the reviewers singled out for particular praise the duet for the automata, "Put a penny in the Slot".

A later critic, Hesketh Pearson, rated the libretto of The Mountebanks "as good as any but the best Savoy pieces".
