= Lyric Theatre, London =

West End theatre in London

Lyric Theatre
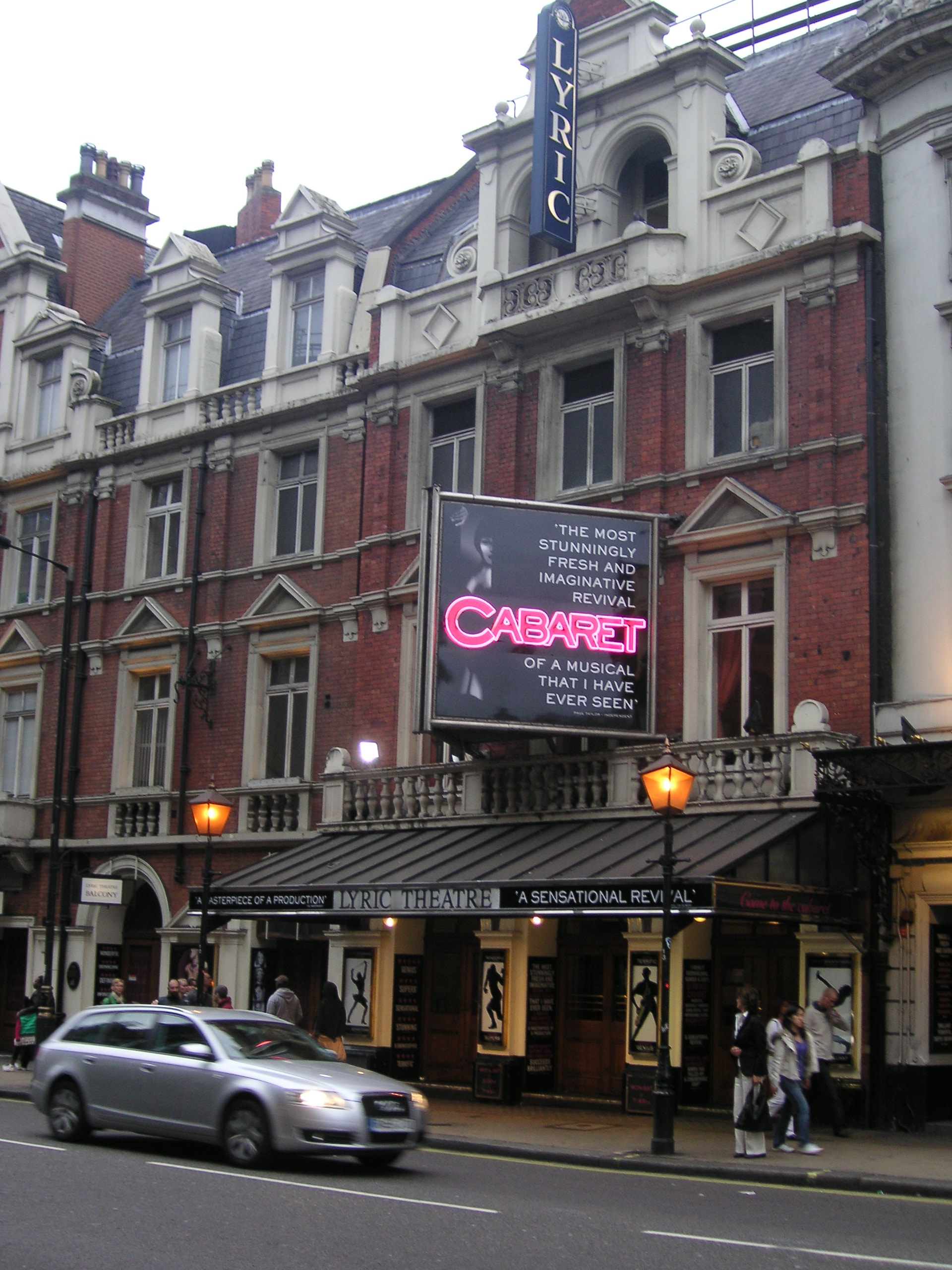
- The Lyric Theatre in April 2007
- Interactive map of Lyric Theatre
- Address: Shaftesbury Avenue; London, W1; United Kingdom
- Coordinates: 51°30′41″N 0°08′01″W
- Owner: Nimax Theatres
- Capacity: 915 on four levels (1,306 originally)
- Type: West End theatre
- Designation: Grade II
- Production: Hadestown
- Public transit: Piccadilly Circus

Construction
- Opened: 17 December 1888; 137 years ago
- Architect: C. J. Phipps

Website
- http://www.nimaxtheatres.com/lyric-theatre/

The Lyric Theatre is a West End theatre in Shaftesbury Avenue in the City of Westminster. It was built for the producer Henry Leslie, who financed it from the profits of the light opera hit, Dorothy, which he transferred from its original venue to open the new theatre on 17 December 1888.

Under Leslie and his early successors the house specialised in musical theatre, and that tradition has continued intermittently throughout the theatre's existence. Musical productions in the theatre's first four decades included The Mountebanks (1892), His Excellency (1894), The Duchess of Dantzig (1903), The Chocolate Soldier (1910) and Lilac Time (1922). Later musical shows included Irma La Douce (1958), Robert and Elizabeth (1964), John, Paul, George, Ringo ... and Bert (1974), Blood Brothers (1983), Five Guys Named Moe (1990) and Thriller – Live (2009).

Many non-musical productions have been staged at the Lyric, from Shakespeare to O'Neill and Strindberg, as well as new pieces by Noël Coward, Terence Rattigan, Alan Ayckbourn, Alan Bennett and others. Stars appearing at the theatre included, in the early years, Marie Tempest, Johnston Forbes-Robertson, Eleonora Duse, Ellen Terry and Tallulah Bankhead, and in the mid-20th-century Alfred Lunt and Lynn Fontanne, Laurence Olivier, Ralph Richardson and Vivien Leigh. More recently Alec Guinness, Joan Plowright, Glenda Jackson, John Malkovich, Woody Harrelson and Ian McKellen have starred.

== History ==
In a 2017 survey of London's theatres, Michael Coveney observes that the 1880s marked the beginning of "a building boom … that signals the true making of the West End". The Lyric was one of twelve new or wholly rebuilt theatres of that decade. (Note: New theatres were the Comedy (1881); Savoy (1881); Novelty (1882); Avenue (1882); Empire (1884); Prince of Wales (1884); Terry's (1887); Shaftesbury; and Lyric (1888). Three theatres were completely rebuilt: the Princess's (1880); Alhambra (1882); and Strand (1882).) It was the second theatre to be constructed in Shaftesbury Avenue and is the oldest still surviving. (Note: The first, the Shaftesbury, was bombed during the Second World War.) It was commissioned by the producer Henry Leslie with profits from the Alfred Cellier and B. C. Stephenson hit, Dorothy; Leslie was said to have made £100,000 from the show. The architect was C. J. Phipps, who also designed the Savoy, Lyceum and Her Majesty's theatres.

The theatre is on four levels, and originally had a capacity of 1,306, later reduced to about 900. A contemporary description of the new theatre said, "The façade is of the Renaissance style in red brick and Portland stone, divided in the centre and two wings, each surmounted with a high pitched gable with recessed arcades" and "The frame of the proscenium is of brown and white alabaster: the sides of the stalls and pit are lined with walnut and sycamore panelling, with handsome carved mouldings". The theatre retains many of its original features, including an original 1767 house front, incorporated into the rear of the building, the former house and museum of Sir William Hunter. (Note: The Lyric was Grade II listed by English Heritage in September 1960.)

The theatre opened on 17 December 1888 with the 817th performance of Dorothy, transferred from the Prince of Wales Theatre. The piece starred Marie Tempest in the title role, with Amy Augarde, Florence Perry and Hayden Coffin. In a short speech after the performance Leslie told the audience he hoped "to follow the plan of the Paris Opéra-Comique in producing works by native composers". Dorothy was followed in April 1889 by Doris, by the same author and composer, which failed to emulate its predecessor's record-breaking success and closed after a modest run of 202 performances. Leslie's third offering, The Red Hussar by Henry Pottinger Stephens and Edward Solomon, ran for 175 performances from November 1889, after which Leslie gave up the Lyric. Horace Sedger became the licensee, manager and sole lessee, at the then enormous rent of £6,500 a year.

=== 1890s ===
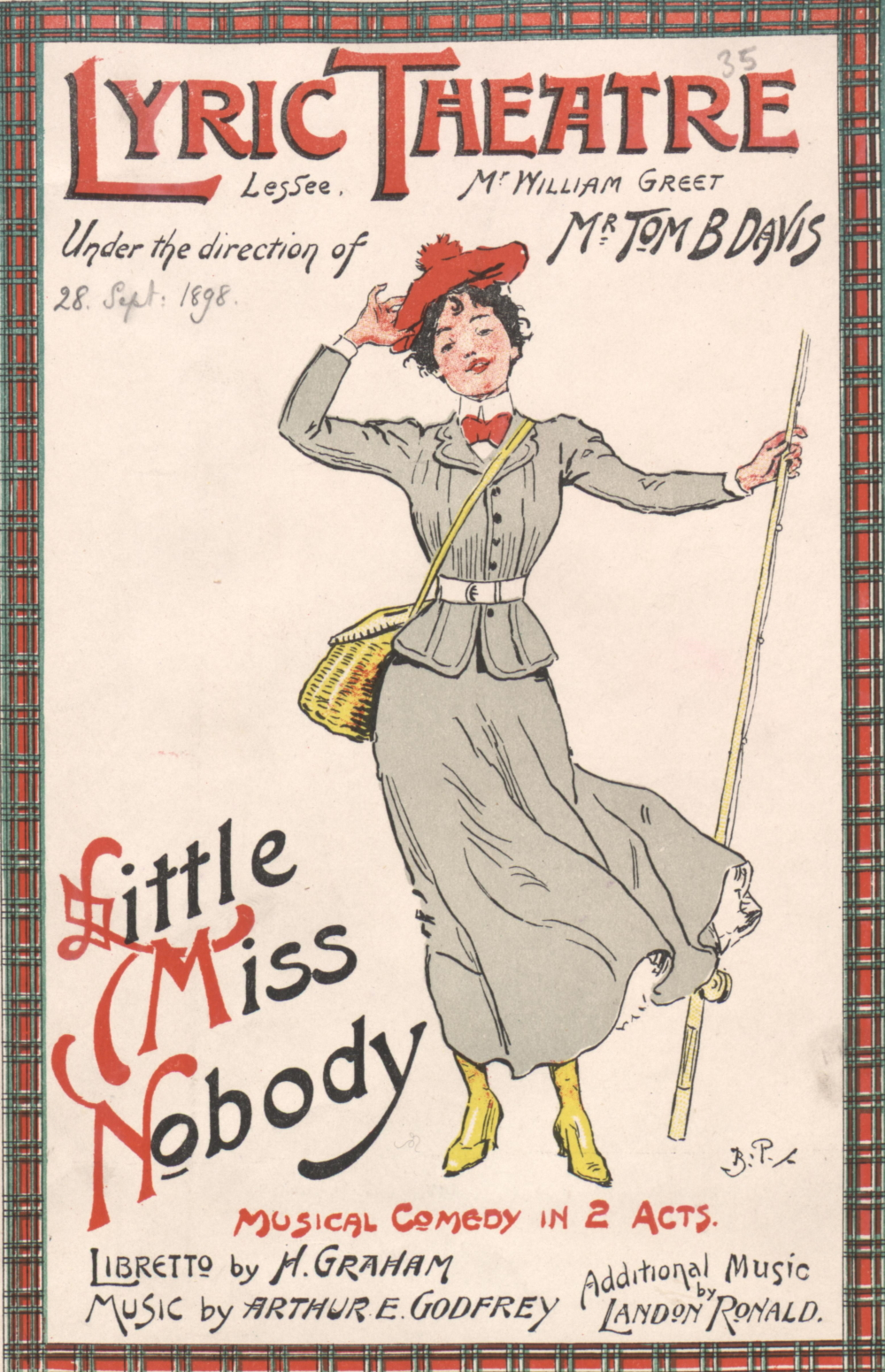
1898 Lyric poster

Sedger had an early success with his production of Edmond Audran's La cigale, in an English adaptation by F. C. Burnand with additional music by Ivan Caryll; it ran for 423 performances from October 1890. Apart from a short season by the celebrated Italian actress Eleonora Duse in her first appearance in Britain, Sedger continued with musical works: The Mountebanks by W. S. Gilbert and Alfred Cellier (1892), Incognita (1892), an adaptation of Charles Lecocq's Le coeur et la main; The Magic Opal (1893) by Arthur Law and Isaac Albéniz; The Golden Web (1893) by Stephenson, Frederick Corder and Arthur Thomas; and Little Christopher Columbus (1893) by G. R. Sims, Cecil Raleigh and Caryll. Some of these were critical and artistic successes, but overall they lost money, and Sedger went bankrupt.

In 1894 George Edwardes produced His Excellency, a comic opera with a libretto by Gilbert and music by F. Osmond Carr. It closed after 162 performances, victim of an influenza epidemic that kept audiences away from theatres. William Greet then took the theatre, presenting The Sign of the Cross, written by and starring Wilson Barrett. This play, about a Roman patrician converted to Christianity by his love for a Christian girl, brought people to the Lyric who had never before entered a theatre, and it ran for 435 performances from January 1896. Greet and Barrett followed this with the latter's Daughters of Babylon, co-starring Maud Jeffries; among the junior members of the enormous cast was the young Constance Collier. In 1897 and 1898 two French actresses played seasons at the Lyric, first Gabrielle Réjane and then Sarah Bernhardt. For the rest of the 1890s musical pieces returned: Little Miss Nobody by Harry Graham with music by Arthur E. Godfrey and Landon Ronald (1898), L'amour mouille by Louis Varney (1899), and most successful, Florodora (1899), starring Evie Greene, which ran for 455 performances and was also a hit in New York.

=== 1900–1914 ===
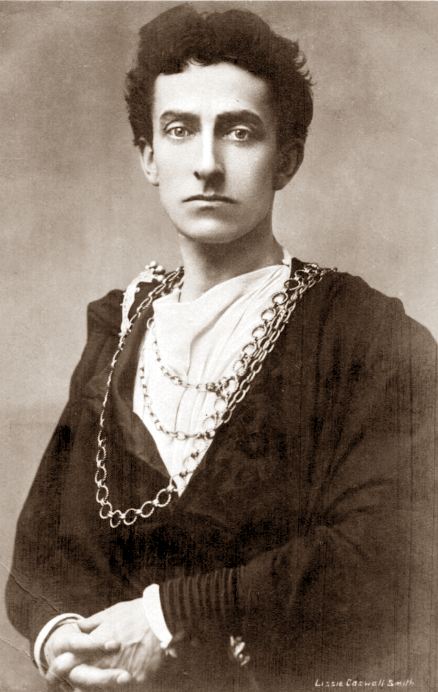
Johnston Forbes-Robertson as Hamlet

In 1902 Johnston Forbes-Robertson starred in a season; his repertory included Othello and Hamlet, with Gertrude Elliott as his co-star. His Hamlet was described in the press as "the most refined and beautiful embodiment of Hamlet vouchsafed to our generation", and "a revelation". Max Beerbohm said, "He shows us, for the first time, Hamlet as a quite definite and intelligible being".

Musical comedy returned to the Lyric at the end of Forbes-Robertson's season, with The Medal and the Maid (1903), by Owen Hall and Sidney Jones, with Ada Reeve and Ruth Vincent, and The Duchess of Dantzig (1903), by Henry Hamilton and Caryll, with Evie Greene and Courtice Pounds. The Talk of the Town (1904) by Seymour Hicks and several composers, starred Agnes Fraser, her husband Walter Passmore, and Henry Lytton. It was followed by The Blue Moon, with music by Howard Talbot and Paul Rubens, in which Florence Smithson made her London debut. From 1906 to 1910 Lewis Waller was based at the Lyric, in plays ranging from Shakespeare to romantic costume drama and classic comedy in The Rivals with Kate Cutler as Lydia and Lottie Venne as Mrs Malaprop.

In 1910 the Lyric presented The Chocolate Soldier, a musical version of Bernard Shaw's Arms and the Man, with music by Oscar Straus; Shaw detested the piece and called it "that degradation of a decent comedy into a dirty farce", but the public liked it, and it ran for 500 performances. Philip Michael Faraday, co-producer of this success, became sole director of the Lyric in 1911 and presented Nightbirds (an adaptation of Die Fledermaus, 1912), The Five Frankforters (described as a "Viennese banking comedy", 1912), The Girl in the Taxi (1912), The Girl Who Didn't (1913), and Mamzelle Tralala (1914).

=== 1914–1929 ===
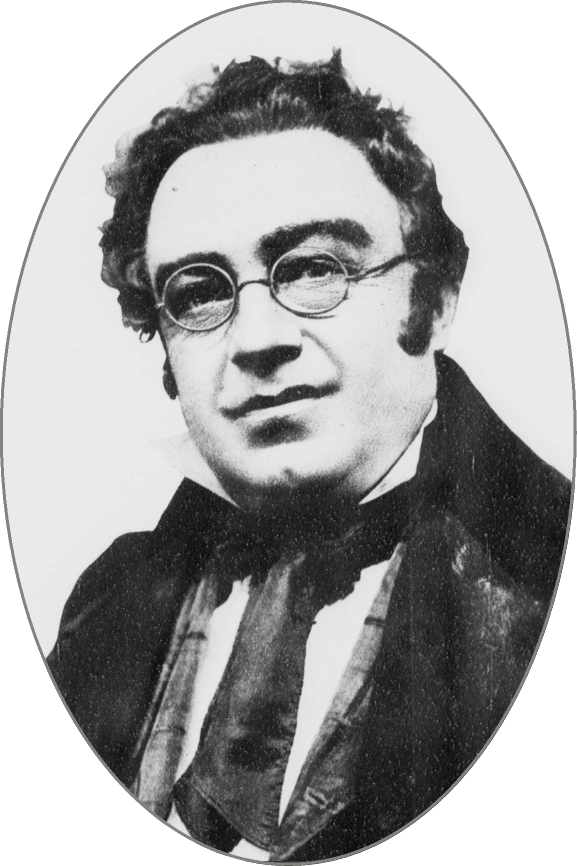
Courtice Pounds as Schubert in Lilac Time, 1922

William Greet was succeeded as lessee by Edward Engelbach in 1914. For a while, musical productions were not seen at the Lyric, and non-musical drama prevailed, including On Trial, an unusual melodrama that opened with the end of the story and worked backwards to the beginning. It had a satisfactory run of 174 performances. Romance, starring Doris Keane and Owen Nares, transferred from the Duke of York's Theatre to the Lyric, where it finished its run of 1,049 performances. Keane then starred in the comedy Roxana (1918); the reviews were excellent. In 1919 she played Juliet opposite the Romeo of her husband, Basil Sydney; this time the reviews were dreadful. The Nurse, played by Ellen Terry, was seen as the saving grace of the production.

Musical comedy resumed its place at the Lyric in the early 1920s. Whirled into Happiness (1922), a musical farce with music by Robert Stolz and words by Harry Graham, had a run of 244 performances; Lilac Time, with Courtice Pounds in the lead as Franz Schubert, opened in December 1922 and had 626 performances. The Street Singer, by Frederick Lonsdale, with music by Harold Fraser-Simson, starring Phyllis Dare and Harry Welchman, ran for 360 performances from June 1924.

Non-musical plays dominated the Lyric's programmes in the rest of the 1920s. The theatre historians Mander and Mitchenson write that in 1926 and 1927 two names became closely associated with the theatre: "Three plays by Avery Hopwood had outstanding runs: The Best People, written in collaboration with David Grey (1926), 309 performances; The Gold Diggers (1926), 180 performances; and The Garden of Eden (1927), 232 performances". The last two featured the actress Tallulah Bankhead, then a considerable box-office draw among the "bright young things" of the 1920s. She appeared again at the Lyric in Her Cardboard Lover (1928) and Let Us Be Gay (1929).

=== 1930–1945 ===
From 1930 to the Second World War the Lyric staged a succession of non-musical plays. Those of the early 1930s included Eugene O'Neill's six-hour-long Strange Interlude (1931); Dodie Smith's Autumn Crocus (1931), with Fay Compton, Martita Hunt and Jessica Tandy, which ran for 317 performances; J. B. Priestley's Dangerous Corner (1932) with Flora Robson; Rose Franken's Another Language (1932) with Edna Best and Herbert Marshall; and Rachel Crothers's When Ladies Meet (1933).

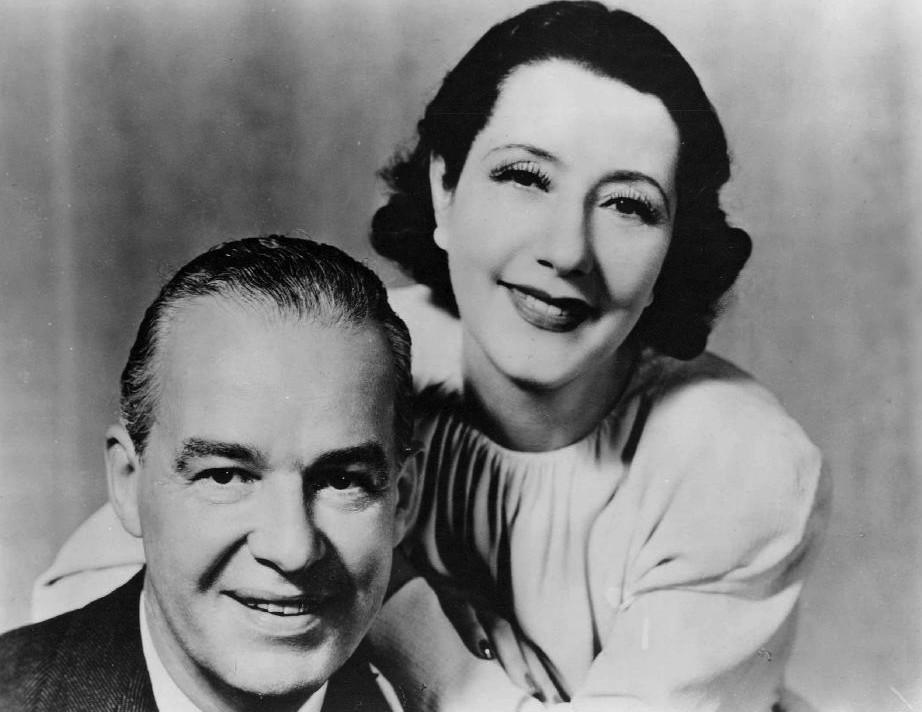
Alfred Lunt and Lynn Fontanne (1950)

In 1933 Thomas Bostock became proprietor of the theatre and had it renovated. The following year Alfred Lunt and his wife Lynn Fontanne had a success with Robert E. Sherwood's Reunion in Vienna, in which they had appeared on Broadway in 1931–32. Other productions of the mid-1930s included Sidney Kingsley's Men in White (1934) and Noël Coward's production of Theatre Royal by Edna Ferber and George S. Kaufman (1934), (seen on Broadway in 1927 under the title The Royal Family) starring Madge Titheradge and the young Laurence Olivier, and returning Marie Tempest to the theatre after nearly a half century. In 1935 Sherwood's Tovarich (based on Jacques Deval's 1933 French play) ran for 414 performances.

Priestley's Bees on the Boatdeck (1936), directed by and starring Ralph Richardson and Olivier, was not a success; Maurice Colbourne's Charles the King (1936) fared better; Gwen Ffrangcon-Davies and Barry Jones starred. In 1936 Edward VIII lifted the long-standing ban on stage personations of his great-grandmother, Queen Victoria, and Laurence Housman's Victoria Regina, seen only in private performance up to this point, was given its first public production, with Pamela Stanley in the title role, and ran for 337 performances.

The Lunts returned in 1938 with a transfer of their Broadway production of Amphitryon 38, S. N. Behrman's adaptation of a French original by Jean Giraudoux; this was followed by Charles Morgan's The Flashing Stream, which ran for 201 performances with Godfrey Tearle and Margaret Rawlings. The war years were a lean period for the Lyric, with only few substantial runs such as The Nutmeg Tree by Margery Sharp, starring Yvonne Arnaud, which ran for 269 performances in 1941–42. In 1943 the theatre came under the control of Prince Littler. The Lunts returned in Terence Rattigan's Love In Idleness in 1944.

=== 1946–1970 ===
After the war the Lyric had many substantial runs, beginning with Rattigan's The Winslow Boy (476 performances) from May 1946. The 18th-century comedy The Beaux' Stratagem was revived in 1949, starring John Clements and Kay Hammond and had most of its 532 performances at the Lyric. In August 1950 The Little Hut opened, starring Robert Morley, Joan Tetzel and David Tomlinson. This light comedy by Nancy Mitford, adapted from La petite hutte by André Roussin, ran for 1,261 performances until September 1953. The Confidential Clerk by T. S. Eliot (1953), transferred successfully from the Edinburgh Festival.

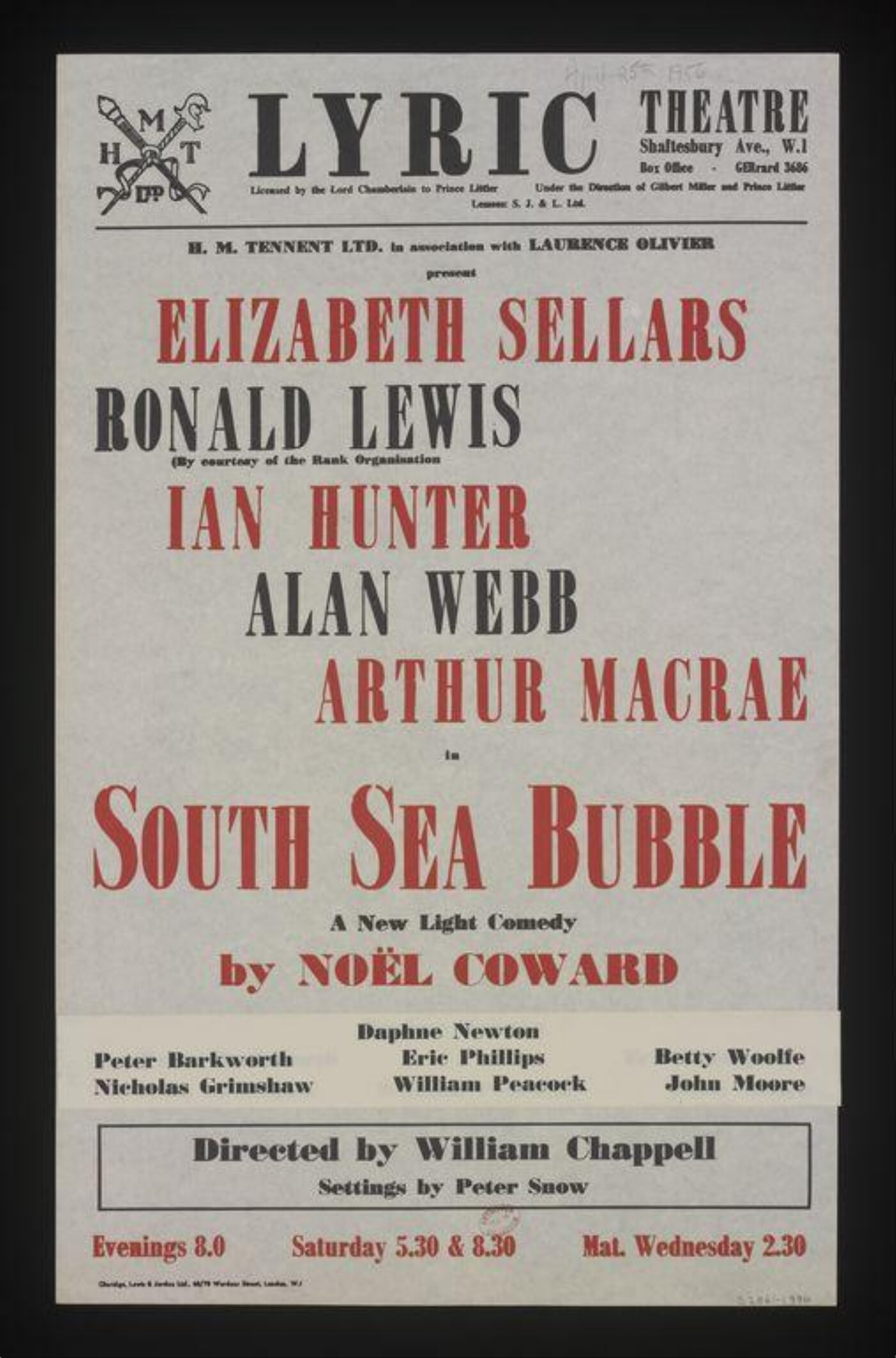
South Sea Bubble, 1956

In April 1954 another long run (433 performances) began with Hippo Dancing, another Roussin plot, adapted by and starring Morley. There were good runs in 1955 with My Three Angels, an adaptation of Albert Husson's comedy La Cuisine des anges, and in 1956 with Coward's romantic comedy South Sea Bubble, starring Vivien Leigh and subsequently Elizabeth Sellars (276 performances).

Two musicals kept the theatre occupied from December 1956 into the 1960s; the first was Grab Me a Gondola, with Joan Heal, Denis Quilley, and Jane Wenham, which ran for a total of 673 performances. (Note: The show played briefly at Theatre Royal, Windsor and then the Lyric Theatre, Hammersmith before moving to the Lyric for its West End run.) The second was Irma la Douce, starring Elizabeth Seal and Keith Michell, which opened in July 1958 and ran for 1,512 performances, closing in March 1962.

After Irma la Douce the Lyric had a series of comparatively short-lived productions. From March 1962 to November 1963 six plays opened and closed. After that a dramatisation of The Wings of the Dove, featuring Wendy Hiller and Susannah York did well, transferring to the Haymarket Theatre to complete a run of 323 performances. The next long-running piece at the theatre was Robert and Elizabeth, a musical about the elopement of Robert Browning and Elizabeth Barrett, which ran for 948 performances from October 1964 to January 1967. Oh, Clarence, based on P. G. Wodehouse's Blandings stories (1968) starred Naunton Wayne as Lord Emsworth. Neil Simon's Plaza Suite, starring Paul Rogers and Rosemary Harris, ran from February to November 1969.

=== 1970s ===
The Lyric began the decade with The Battle of Shrivings by Peter Shaffer (1970), described by a reviewer as "the biggest flop of his career"; it starred John Gielgud as a celibate vegetarian philosopher. Alan Ayckbourn's comedy How the Other Half Loves opened on 5 August 1970 and ran for 869 performances. In 1972–73 Deborah Kerr appeared in The Day After the Fair, an adaptation of a story by Thomas Hardy, which ran for seven months and then closed to allow the star to open the play in the US.

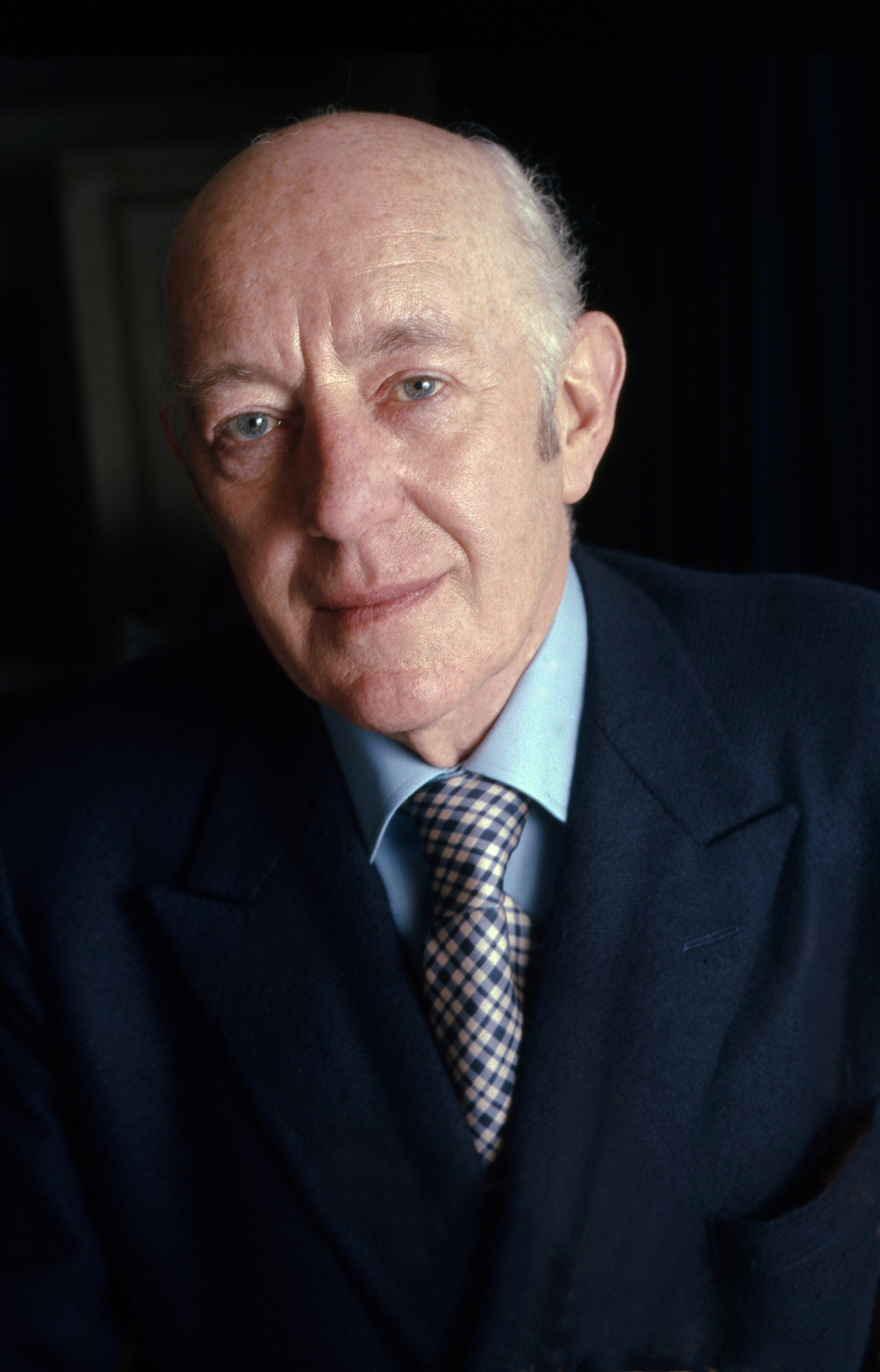
Alec Guinness, 1973

Alec Guinness played the lead role of Dr Wicksteed, the "medical philosopher and furtive lecher", in Alan Bennett's 1973 comedy Habeas Corpus. The play ran into 1974 and Robert Hardy took over as Wicksteed from February until the run ended in August, after 543 performances. The production was followed by an import from the Everyman Theatre, Liverpool, which ran at the Lyric for 418 performances: Willy Russell's Beatles musical, John, Paul, George, Ringo ... and Bert, with a cast largely new to the West End, including Anthony Sher, Bernard Hill, Trevor Eve and Barbara Dickson. In 1975 the Lyric staged the first major London production of Harold Pinter's The Birthday Party since what The Times called "its famous flop" at its premiere in 1958.

In 1975–76 H. M. Tennent presented a season of comedies directed by Lindsay Anderson. The company, headed by Joan Plowright, with John Moffatt, Peter McEnery and Helen Mirren, gave Chekhov's The Seagull in repertory with The Bed Before Yesterday, a new play by the 89-year-old Ben Travers, author of the Aldwych farces of the 1920s and 1930s. The Travers play ran through 1976 and into 1977, a total of 497 performances. It was succeeded by Anderson's production of William Douglas-Home's comedy The Kingfisher, starring Celia Johnson and Ralph Richardson. The piece played to full houses for six months, at the end of which it closed because Johnson did not wish to renew her contract and Richardson declined to play opposite any substitute leading lady. In 1978 Plowright returned to the Lyric, starring with Colin Blakely and Patricia Hayes in Franco Zeffirelli's production of Eduardo De Filippo's Filumena. At the end of the decade, Jessica Tandy and her husband Hume Cronyn appeared in the two-hander The Gin Game by Donald L. Coburn (1979).

=== 1980s and 1990s ===
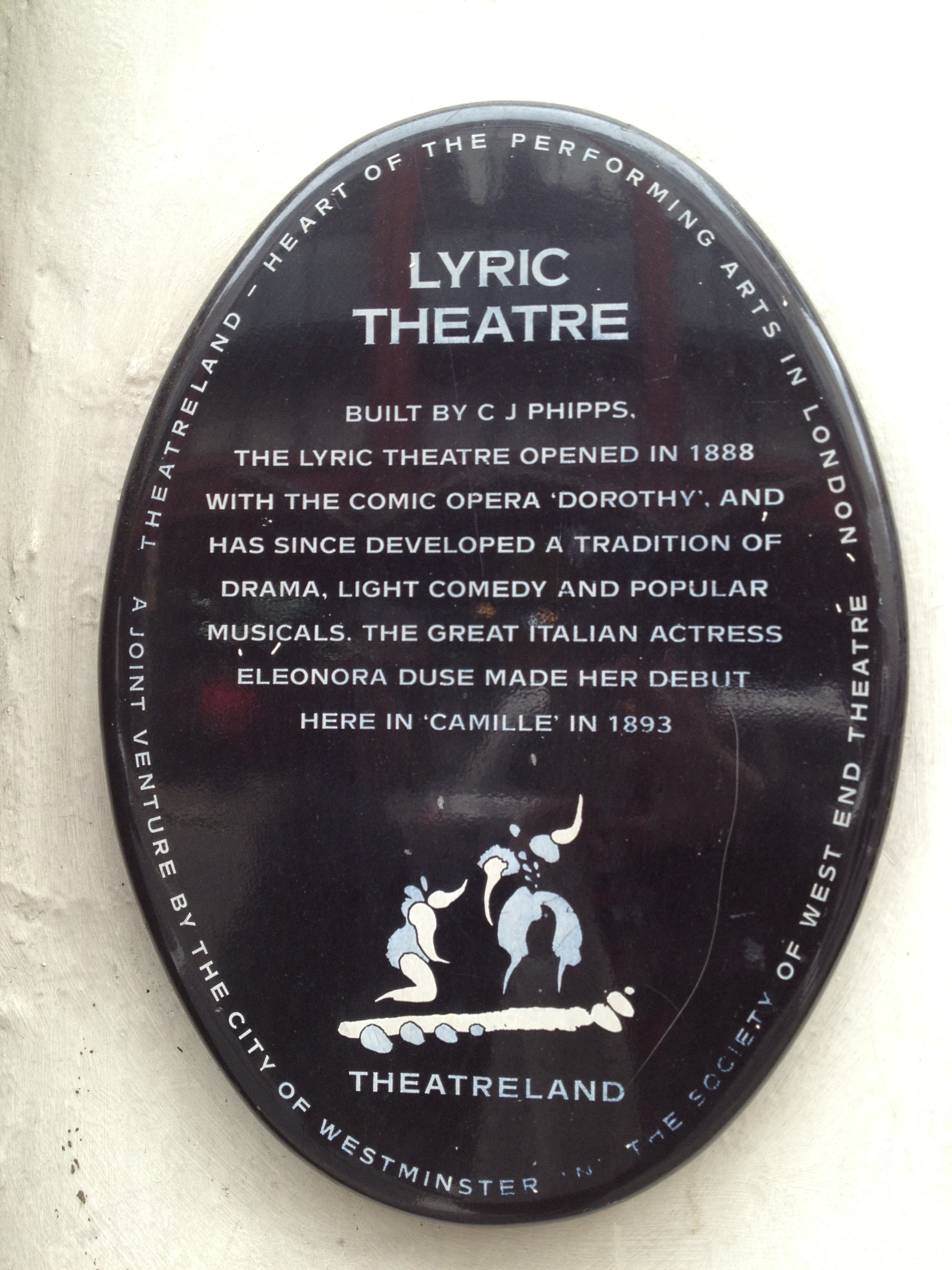
Plaque on the exterior of the Lyric

Richard Briers and Paul Eddington starred in the comedy Middle Age Spread in early 1980; Rodney Bewes and Francis Matthews took over in June before the play moved to the Apollo Theatre. Ayckbourn's Taking Steps – "the best farce in town" according to Punch – opened at the Lyric in September, running until June 1981. In August John Standing and Estelle Kohler starred in a rare West End revival of three of Noël Coward's plays from Tonight at 8.30. In 1982 Briers and Peter Egan in Shaw's Arms and the Man were followed by Glenda Jackson and Georgina Hale in a new play, Summit Conference, which ran from April to October. Another Willy Russell musical, Blood Brothers, made its London debut at the Lyric, running from April to October 1983, winning the Laurence Olivier Award for Best New Musical and later in the decade beginning a long-running West End revival. The theatre then reverted to non-musical drama with Hugh Whitemore's Pack of Lies with Judi Dench and Michael Williams in the leading roles; it ran for nearly a year.

A revival of Joe Orton's Loot in 1984 made headlines when the star, Leonard Rossiter, died in his dressing-room during a performance. The run continued with Dinsdale Landen in the role. There was a short-lived return to musical theatre in 1985, with a stage adaptation of Lerner and Loewe's film Gigi. Ayckbourn and Russell were again on the bill, with the former's A Chorus of Disapproval (1986) and the latter's non-musical comedy One for the Road (1987). In 1988–89 Brian Rix presented and starred in a revival of the Whitehall farce Dry Rot, thirty years after its original London run.

The façade of the theatre was restored in 1994. Looking back at past shows, the Lyric's website in 2020 singled out eleven productions from the 1990s. The first four were Burn This, starring John Malkovich (1990); Cameron Mackintosh's production of Five Guys Named Moe, which ran from 1990 to 1995; a musical revival Ain't Misbehavin' (1995); and Leo McKern in Hobson's Choice from the Chichester Festival Theatre. In 1995 the theatre hosted an unusual show described as the "Australian dance sensation Tap Dogs". Wodehouse characters returned to the Lyric in By Jeeves, by Ayckbourn and Andrew Lloyd Webber, played in 1996. Siân Phillips starred as Marlene Dietrich in Pam Gems's play with music Marlene directed by Sean Mathias in 1997. Three transfers from other theatres followed: Antony Sher in the Royal Shakespeare Company's Cyrano de Bergerac (1997); Patrick Marber's Closer from the National Theatre; and Animal Crackers from the Royal Exchange, Manchester. The last show of the 1990s listed by the Lyric website is Ayckbourn's Comic Potential (1999).

=== 2000–present ===
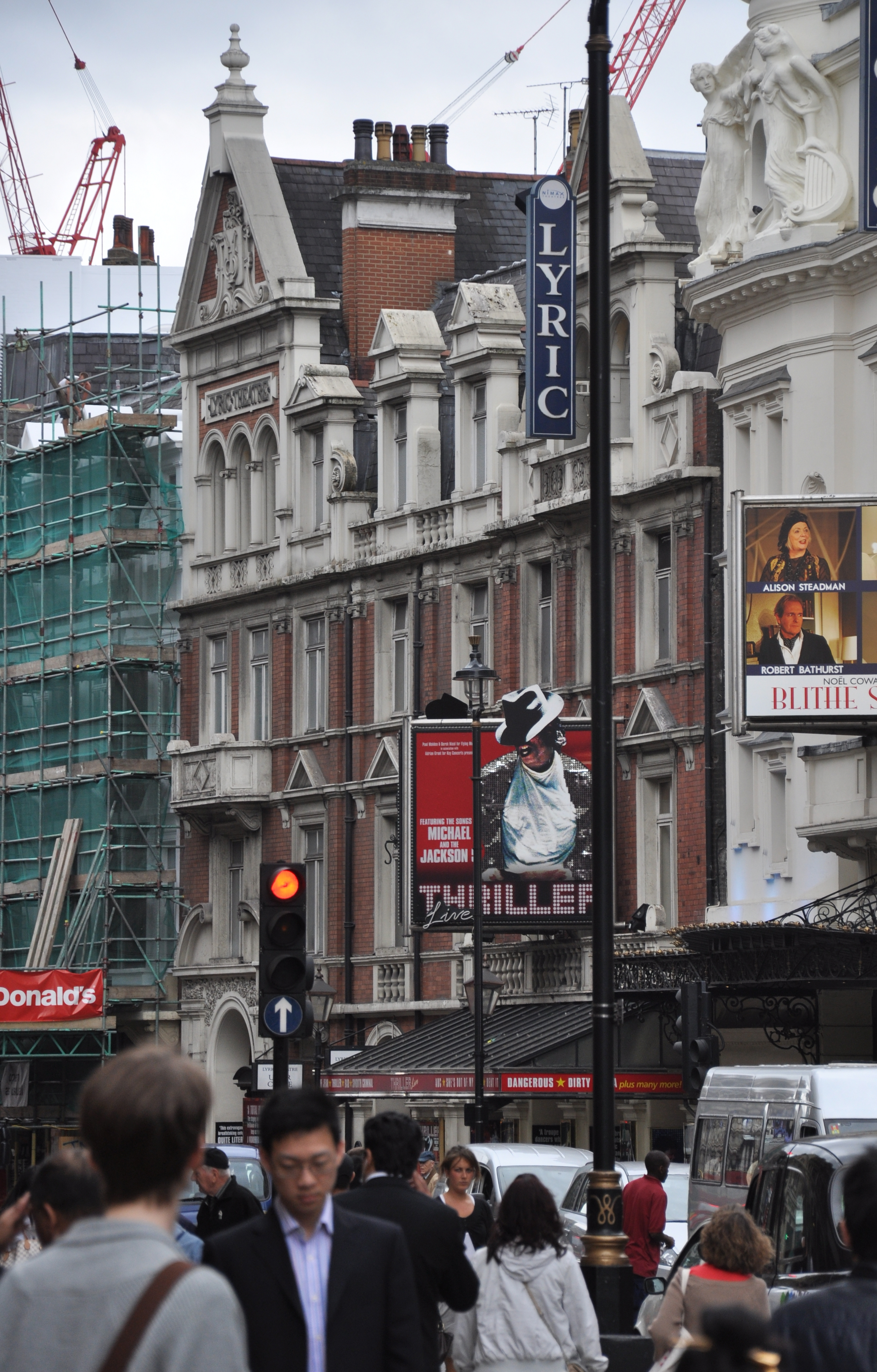
The Lyric in 2011

The theatre twice changed hands in the 2000s. It was bought by Lloyd Webber's Really Useful Group in 2000, and in 2005 it was acquired as part of Nimax Theatres. Productions of the 2000s included Fanny Burney's satirical Georgian play A Busy Day, with Stephanie Beacham and Sara Crowe (2000). This was followed in the same year by a stage adaptation of Coward's 1945 film Brief Encounter with Jenny Seagrove and Christopher Cazenove and then a revival of Eugene O'Neill's drama Long Day's Journey Into Night, starring Jessica Lange. There was another Coward production the following year: Thelma Holt presented the first full-scale production of the 1926 play Semi-Monde. Later in 2001 the Lyric presented Barbara Cook Sings Mostly Sondheim and Brendan Fraser in Cat on a Hot Tin Roof.

In 2002 the "jolly hockey sticks" schoolgirl comedy Daisy Pulls it Off ran for three months, Ian McKellen and Frances de la Tour starred in a revival of Strindberg's The Dance of Death in 2003. Bill Kenwright presented Night of the Iguana starring Woody Harrelson, Clare Higgins and Jenny Seagrove in 2005. In 2006 Phil McIntyre staged a new play Smaller by Carmel Morgan, starring Dawn French and Alison Moyet.

A revival of the musical Cabaret in 2006 starred James Dreyfus and then Julian Clary and Alistair McGowan as the MC. Thriller – Live, a Michael Jackson tribute revue, opened at the Lyric in January 2009 and, despite being described by The Times as "about as thrilling as a bowl of cold custard", and by The Daily Telegraph as, in parts, "hagiographical twaddle", was still running when the London theatres closed in March 2020 because of the COVID-19 pandemic.

The theatre reopened on 5 December 2020, with a socially distanced production of the musical Six, but closed due to further pandemic restrictions on 15 December. The musical reopened at the theatre on in May 2021 and ran until August. Get Up, Stand Up! The Bob Marley Musical opened at the theatre in October 2021 and ran for 15 months before closing in January 2023. A revival of Aspects of Love, starring Michael Ball, ran from May to August 2023. Peter Pan Goes Wrong ran from November 2023 to January 2024, followed by the West End premiere of Hadestown, which opened at the theatre in February 2024.

== Notes, references and sources ==
=== Sources ===
- Bergan, Ronald (1990). The Great Theatres of London: An Illustrated Companion. London: Prion. ISBN 978-1-85375-057-1.
- Clark, Walter Aaron (2002). Isaac Albéniz: Portrait of a Romantic. Oxford: Oxford University Press. ISBN 978-0-19-925052-3.
- Coveney, Michael (2017). London Theatres. London: Frances Lincoln. ISBN 978-1-78101-235-2.
- Gänzl, Kurt; Andrew Lamb (1988). Gänzl's Book of the Musical Theatre. London: The Bodley Head. OCLC 966051934.
- Gaye, Freda, ed. (1967). Who's Who in the Theatre (fourteenth ed.). London: Sir Isaac Pitman and Sons. OCLC 5997224.
- Herbert, Ian, ed. (1977). Who's Who in the Theatre, Volume 2 (seventeenth ed.). London and Detroit: Pitman Publishing and Gale Research. ISBN 978-0-8103-0234-1.
- Holroyd, Michael (1990). Bernard Shaw, Volume 1: 1856–1898: The Search for Love. London: Penguin. ISBN 978-0-14-012441-5.
- Kabatchnik, Amnon (2010). Blood on the Stage, 1925–1950. Lanham: Scarecrow Press. ISBN 978-0-8108-6963-9.
- Mander, Raymond; Joe Mitchenson (1963). The Theatres of London. London: Rupert Hart-Davis. OCLC 1151457675.
- Mander, Raymond; Joe Mitchenson (1974). Lost Theatres of London (second ed.). London: Rupert Hart-Davis. OCLC 41974.
- Mander, Raymond; Joe Mitchenson (2000) [1957]. Barry Day; Sheridan Morley (eds.). Theatrical Companion to Coward (Second ed.). London: Oberon Books. ISBN 978-1-84002-054-0.
- Miller, John (1995). Ralph Richardson: The Authorized Biography. London: Sidgwick and Jackson. ISBN 978-0-283-06237-7.
- Stedman, Jane W. (1996). W. S. Gilbert, A Classic Victorian & His Theatre. Oxford University Press. ISBN 978-0-19-816174-5.
