= Le Cœur et la Main =

Three-act opéra comique by Charles Lecocq

Poster for first production, 1882

Le Cœur et la Main (French for 'The Heart and the Hand') is a three-act opéra comique with music by Charles Lecocq and words by Charles Nuitter and Alexandre Beaume. It was first performed on 19 October 1882 at the Théâtre de Nouveautés, Paris.

The plot revolves around an arranged royal marriage and the determination of the reluctant bridegroom to subvert it. He eventually finds that his royal bride is in fact the woman he has fallen in love with while unaware of her real identity.

== Background ==
During the 1870s Lecocq had supplanted Jacques Offenbach as Paris's favourite composer of comic operas. He had been chiefly associated with the Théâtre de la Renaissance, where his Giroflé-Girofla (1874), La Petite Mariée (1875) and Le Petit Duc (1878) were particularly successful. Having quarrelled with the director of the Renaissance, Victor Koning, Lecocq had transferred his allegiance to the Théâtre de Nouveautés, where in 1881 he had a box-office hit with Le Jour et la Nuit Le Cœur et la Main was written to succeed it. The librettists, both new partners for the composer, were experienced, particularly Nuitter, who had collaborated extensively with Offenbach in the 1860s and 1870s. They continued with the theme, familiar from earlier Lecocq operas, of thwarted and confused wedding nights with a happy ending.

== First production ==
The opera opened on 19 October 1882, as the run of Le jour et la nuit was coming towards its end. Lecocq took the unusual step of writing the hero's part for a baritone rather than the customary tenor. The role was played by Eugène Vauthier. He and Jean-François Berthelier, who had starred in Le jour et la nuit, were well known to Parisian audiences. The leading female role, Micaëla, was played by Marguerite Vaillant-Couturier, a newcomer.

== Original cast ==
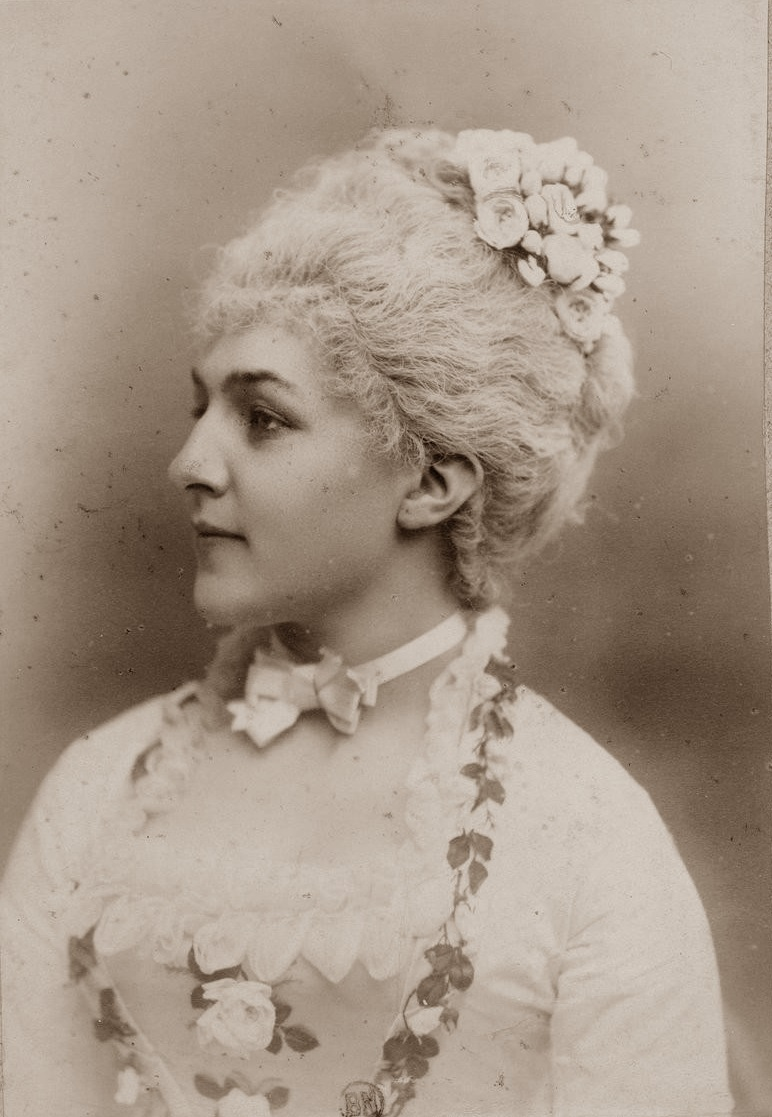
Marguerite Vaillant-Couturier as Micaëla, 1882

- The King of Aragon – Jean-François Berthelier
- Princess Micaëla, his daughter – Marguerite Vaillant-Couturier
- Doña Inésilla Vittoria Scholastica Nepomucena, her duenna – Mme Felcourt
- Don Gaëtan, Duke of Madeira – Eugène Vauthier
- Don Mosquitos, a colonel of the King's army – Scipion
- Moralès, a soldier – Edouard Montaubry
- Joséfa, a royal gardener – Élise Clary
- Baldomèro, a brigadier – M. Charvet

Source: Gänzl's Book of the Musical Theatre.

== Synopsis ==
The action takes place in an imaginary kingdom, at an unspecified period.

Act I
The Royal Park

A marriage has been arranged between Micaëla, the King's daughter, and Don Gaëtan, Crown Prince of a neighbouring country. Micaëla is not enamoured of palace life and escapes when possible to join her friend Joséfa, the gardener. Gaëtan arrives, angry at being forced into an arranged marriage. He is of a romantic disposition and wants a love-match. He escapes the discreet supervision to which he is subject; the King orders that he be sought and found promptly.

Gaëtan evades those looking for him and emerges from his hiding place. He meets Micaëla who, wearing Joséfa's clothes, passes for a gardener. They are immediately attracted to each other. Gaëtan tells Micaëla that he is doomed to marry the princess for reasons of state, but will not even look at her during the whole ceremony. There are noises off, and Gaëtan has only time to declare his love to Micaëla. She flees and the King appears, pleased to have tracked down his future son-in-law.

Act II
A Great Hall of the Royal Palace

Scene from original production, 1882

It is the day of the wedding. On the same day Joséfa has married her lover, Moralès. Faithful to his promise, Gaëtan declines to look at Micaëla during the service or to dance with her afterwards. He cannot escape from the palace as all doors are guarded, but he is determined not to consummate his marriage. Trying to cause a scandal to wreck the marriage he makes a pass at Micaëla's formidable duenna, expecting her to make a tremendous fuss, and he is horrified when she responds eagerly. He evades her.

Joséfa's wedding night seems to be as unpromising as Gaëtan's. Her new husband, Moralès, is in charge of the palace guard, and cannot leave the premises to join his bride. Finding Micaëla's and Gaëtan's nuptial chamber unoccupied Joséfa and Moralès yield to the temptation to put it to use themselves. The King, snooping in the hope of hearing evidence that the royal marriage is proceeding as he hoped, overhears Micaëla's and Gaëtan's billing and cooing and happily assumes that his plans are succeeding.

Gaëtan returns and meets Micaela, once again disguised as a gardener. Their encounter rapidly becomes amorous and they embrace.

Act III
A camp, Gaëtan's headquarters

During a grand military manoeuvre, Micaëla and her suite have retired to a nearby convent. She frequently absents herself to be with Gaëtan, who still thinks she is a gardener. The King comes to tell Gaëtan that the princess is pregnant. Gaëtan is puzzled. Moralès apologises to him for having, on the wedding night, used the nuptial chamber for personal purposes, and Gaëtan now thinks he knows who is the father of the future Crown Prince. Everything becomes clear when Micaëla enters, no longer in disguise. Gaëtan realises he has unknowingly married the women he loves. The soldiers fire a salute to the unborn heir and the opera ends in general rejoicing.

Source: Académie Nationale de l'Opérette.

== Musical numbers ==
Act I:

Eugène Vauthier as Gaëtan, 1882

- Chorus "C'est demain le mariage" (Tomorrow is the wedding)
- Couplets "Au mariage des Princesses" (At the wedding of the Princesses – Joséfa)
- Chorus of guards "C'est nous les gardes du palais" (We are the guards of the palace)
- Chorus "C'est l'heure de la promenade" (It's time for the walk)
- Mélodie "M'y voici, mais pourrai-je?" (Here I am, but can I? – Micaëla)
- Couplets "Vlan! J'ai perdu mon gendre" (Damn! I've lost my son-in-law – King)
- Couplets "Au soldat, après la parade" (To the soldier, after the parade – Morales)
- Rondeau "Ah que de mal on a" (Oh that's wrong – Micaëla)
- Round "Ma fille, c'est un mari" (My daughter, he's a husband – Micaëla)
- Couplets "Par toi divine créature" (By you divine creature – Gaëtan, Micaëla)
- Final: Chorus des Bombardiers "Notre vigilance" (Our vigilance), couplets "Je suis un prince un peu fantasque" (I'm quite a whimsical prince – Gaëtan) et stretto "on n'a jamais vu çà" (We've never seen that – all)

Act II:

- Entracte
- Introduction "La Princesse qui nous marie" (The Princess who marries us)
- Chorus "Dans l'almanach de Gotha" (In the Almanach de Gotha)
- Sextet "Il me regarde à peine" (He's just looking at me)
- Dance "La vive cadence" (The brisk pace – Gaëtan)
- Couplets "Y'avait un jour dans l'infanterie" (Helmet couplets – There was a day in the infantry – all)
- Chorus "Bientôt à la cathédrale" (Soon to the cathedral)
- Couplets "Ma Micaëla, ma chère" (My Micaëla, my dear – king)
- Couplets "Au fond de l'alcôve blottie" (Snuggled at the bottom of the alcove – Micaëla)
- Couplets "C'est-là leur chambre nuptiale" (This is their nuptial room – Joséfa, Moralès)
- Grand duo "Mon devoir ailleurs me rappelle" (My duty elsewhere calls me – Micaëla, Gaëtan) and Boléro "Un soir, José le capitaine" (One evening, Captain José – Micaëla, Gaétan)

Act III:

- Entracte
- Chorus of soldiers "Il a l'épaulette" (He has the epaulette)
- Couplets "Près du couvent, dans la plaine" (Near the convent, in the plain – Micaëla)
- Romance "Ah j'enviais les hirondelles" (Ah I envy the swallows – Micaëla)
- Ensemble "Le parlementaire a sur les yeux un bandeau" (The parliamentarian wears a blindfold)
- Chorus of peasants "Ah! Sire, exaucez nos prières" (Ah! Sire, hear our prayers), et couplets "Ne craignez rien, les belles filles" (Fear nothing, lovely girls – king)
- Couplets "Depuis notre hymen" (Since our marriage – Gaëtan)
- Couplets "Monsieur me croit infidèle" (Monsieur thinks me unfaithful –Joséfa)
- Finale "Je suis Princesse et votre épouse" (I am the princess and your wife – Micaëla, all).

Source: Vocal score.

== Revivals and adaptations ==
Two rival productions of the opera were seen in New York in February 1883, under the titles Hand and Heart and Micaëla. There were two further revivals in New York in 1883 and 1884. The work was not seen in London until ten years after its Paris premiere. It was presented in a heavily revised form as Incognita in October 1892. F. C. Burnand revised the book, Harry Greenbank wrote new lyrics, and there were musical contributions from Isaac Albéniz in Act II, and Hamilton Clarke, Alfred Moul and the conductor of the production, Herbert Bunning, in Act III.

In their 1988 study of musical theatre Kurt Gänzl and Andrew Lamb record no further performances of the piece, in Paris or anywhere else. Lamb, writing in Grove's Dictionary of Music and Musicians, counts it the last of Lecocq's real successes.

== Critical response ==
Lecocq's view of Le Cœur et la Main was:

A nice piece whose first two acts are the best. The third has never satisfied me. The success was very great, and Madame Vaillant-Couturier, an excellent singer, a very pretty woman, who was making her debut in operetta, made an excellent impression. All the roles were well played, the staging admirable, and I count this work among my most successful. In spite of the excellent box-office takings, the director of the theatre, for administrative reasons known to him, abruptly interrupted the run after the hundredth performance to stage another piece.

According to the critical consensus, at the time and subsequently, Le Cœur et la Main is too noticeably similar to its predecessors, musically and dramatically. In his survey of operetta (2016), Richard Traubner concurs with the composer's view that the third act is weak, and remarks on "a tendency to bawdiness" that had not marred Lecocq's previous works, and a lack of the composer's earlier "melodic sparkle".

== References and sources ==
Sources

- Clark, Walter Aaron (2007). Isaac Albéniz: Portrait of a Romantic. Oxford and New York: Oxford University Press. ISBN 978-0-19-925052-3.
- Gänzl, Kurt; Andrew Lamb (1988). Gänzl's Book of the Musical Theatre. London: The Bodley Head. OCLC 966051934.
- Lecocq, Charles (1882). Le coeur et la main vocal score. Paris: Joubert. OCLC 606171246.
- Traubner, Richard (2016). Operetta: A Theatrical History. London: Routledge. ISBN 978-1-138-13892-6.
