= Nancy McIntosh =

American singer and actress

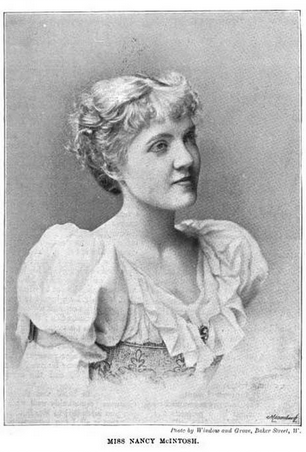
Nancy McIntosh, from an 1893 publication.

Nancy Isobel McIntosh (25 October 1866 – February 20, 1954) was an American-born singer and actress who performed mostly on the London stage. Her father was a member of the South Fork Fishing and Hunting Club, which had been blamed in connection with the 1889 Johnstown Flood that resulted in the loss of over 2,200 lives in Johnstown, Pennsylvania.

McIntosh is perhaps best known for creating the role of Princess Zara in Gilbert and Sullivan's Utopia, Limited in 1893. She obtained this role after beginning a concert singing career in America in 1887, moving to London in 1890 and continuing her concert career in Britain. She became one of the last of W. S. Gilbert's actress protégées and continued her acting and singing career in Britain and America for several years. After McIntosh retired from the stage, she lived with Gilbert and his wife until Lady Gilbert's death in 1936 and eventually inherited Gilbert's estate, helping to preserve his legacy by selling his papers to the British Museum and leaving the remainder of the Gilbert estate to the Royal General Theatrical Fund.

== Early life and career ==
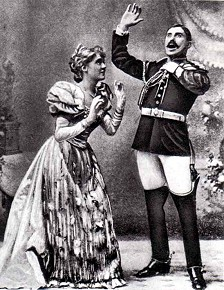
with Charles Kenningham in Utopia, Limited

Nancy McIntosh was born in Cleveland, Ohio, and raised in Pittsburgh, Pennsylvania, the daughter of William A. McIntosh (died 1921) and his wife Minerva née Bottenberg (died 1883). Her father was the president of a public company, the New York and Cleveland Gas Coal Company, and a member of the South Fork Fishing and Hunting Club. The club's activities were blamed (but its members were not held legally responsible) for the failure of the South Fork Dam, which caused the Johnstown Flood in 1889 that resulted in the loss of over 2,200 lives in Johnstown, Pennsylvania. Nancy's brothers were John Stone McIntosh (1860–1889), a businessman, and Burr McIntosh, a writer, publisher, photographer, war correspondent, radio personality, and stage and film actor; both were college athletes. Nancy attended Pittsburgh Female College from 1878 to 1882 and studied music. She was athletic, like her brothers, "an expert horsewoman, had won prizes in sculling matches, could shoot and fence, played baseball and cricket and enjoyed swimming and diving", as well as tennis.

About 1885, McIntish moved to New York to study singing with Signor Achille Errani. She commenced a singing career, making her concert debut on 3 March 1887 at YMCA Hall in Harrisburg, Pennsylvania, produced by William H. Sherwood, and winning effusive reviews. On 1 November 1887, she appeared with Sherwood in the first of several Chickering Musical Bureau concerts in Boston, Massachusetts, singing pieces by, among others, Tosti, Chopin, Bach and Wagner. She also made a specialty of singing Scottish songs. During 1888 and most of 1889, she lived in Tennessee, where she nursed her brother John through his final illness. In 1890 a writer in The Daily Gazette and Free Press of Elmira, New York, after hearing McIntosh at a benefit concert there, noted: "Miss McIntosh ... will sail for London on June 25th and will make her debut there as a concert singer under Randegger at the London academy. It is safe to prophecy that her name will be added to the list of American girls who have carried London by storm."

McIntosh travelled to England with her father in 1890 (shortly after the flood disaster), where she apparently suffered an illness and was unable to sing for about a year. She then studied voice under George Henschel for at least a year and resumed concert appearances, including in Henschel's Serbischer Liederspiel at Kensington Town Hall in December 1891 and at The Crystal Palace, where she sang in Beethoven's Choral Symphony and selections from Wagner's Die Meistersinger. She also performed in the London Symphony Concerts, which Henschel conducted, among other concerts, and in oratorio in the British provinces. Throughout 1892 she sang in Monday Popular Concerts in Hull, Sheffield, Manchester and Liverpool. In December 1892 she sang in Handel's Messiah. Early in 1893 McIntosh sang in a series of concerts under Sir Charles Hallé in Manchester, Wales and Bowness-on-Windermere, among other places. She earned many warm reviews.

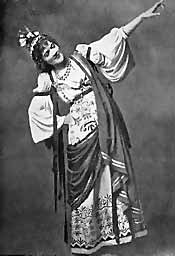
as Christina in His Excellency

In February 1893, Henschel held a dinner party where W. S. Gilbert asked McIntosh if she was interested in singing on stage. Later that year Gilbert asked Arthur Sullivan to hear her audition as the lead soprano in their forthcoming opera, Utopia, Limited. In letters to Sullivan, Gilbert said of her:

"She is rather tall, extremely fair – very nice looking, without being beautiful – good expressive face – no appreciable American twang. Something like a good and ladylike version of Roosevelt. ... She sings up to C (whatever that means) and I am told that she is never out of tune. Miss McIntosh was keenly alive to the advantage of seeing you and she said she would gladly attend any appointment you might make."

Sullivan declined to audition her privately, and she was heard with several other singers on the next audition day at the Savoy Theatre, on 30 June 1893. Sullivan recorded in his diary that he was "Disappointed in her voice ... but I don't think she was at her best – however, she will do as she is nice, sympathetic and intelligent." She was soon engaged by Carte and debuted on the theatrical stage in October 1893 at the Savoy Theatre, creating the role of Princess Zara in Utopia, a role much expanded for her from its initial conception. According to scholar John Wolfson, Gilbert's expansion of the role damaged and unbalanced the script by detracting from its satire of government. Reviewers generally agreed that the inexperienced McIntosh was not a good actress, and during the run of Utopia, which lasted into June 1894, her lack of confidence and ill health combined to affect her performance. Utopia, Limited was to be McIntosh's only part with the D'Oyly Carte Opera Company, as Sullivan refused to write another piece in which she was to take part.

== After Utopia ==
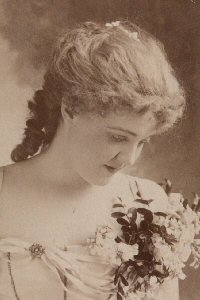
as La Favorita in The Circus Girl

McIntosh became one of the last actress protégées of W. S. Gilbert's. She eventually lived with Gilbert and Lady Gilbert, and they considered her an "adopted" daughter, as they had no children of their own. During Utopia, she appeared in two performances as Dorothy in a revival of Gilbert's Dan'l Druce, Blacksmith (1894) and late that year created the role of Christina in Gilbert and Osmond Carr's His Excellency (1894–95) to generally good reviews. Discussions over McIntosh playing the role of Yum-Yum in a proposed revival of The Mikado led to an argument between Gilbert and Sullivan that delayed the revival, and Gilbert's insistence upon her playing the soprano lead in His Excellency caused Sullivan to refuse to set the piece. Nevertheless, Sullivan encouraged McIntosh to return to concert singing, and in May 1885, McIntosh sang the role of Margarita in Sullivan's cantata The Martyr of Antioch in Dover, receiving a warm review.

McIntosh appeared in the American tour of His Excellency in 1895–1896. She stayed in the U.S. and soon appeared in a revue, Miss Philadelphia, in that city. After spending part of 1896 in England with the Gilberts, she returned to New York to star at Daly's Theatre in the title role of The Geisha (1896–97). She also played Hero in Much Ado About Nothing (singing a solo in the suite of incidental music), Julia Mannering in Guy Mannering, Miranda in The Tempest and La Favorita in The Circus Girl (all in 1897 at Daly's and on tour). After another break in mid-1897, McIntosh returned to the U.S. for another season of The Circus Girl and The Geisha, which continued into 1898. She then retired from the stage, living with the Gilberts and making occasional concert and charity appearances. At a recital at the Bechstein Hall in 1903 she sang 18 songs by Richard Strauss, and at the same hall in 1909 she sang the soprano part in Walford Davies's Pastorale; "a most welcome reappearance", wrote The Times.

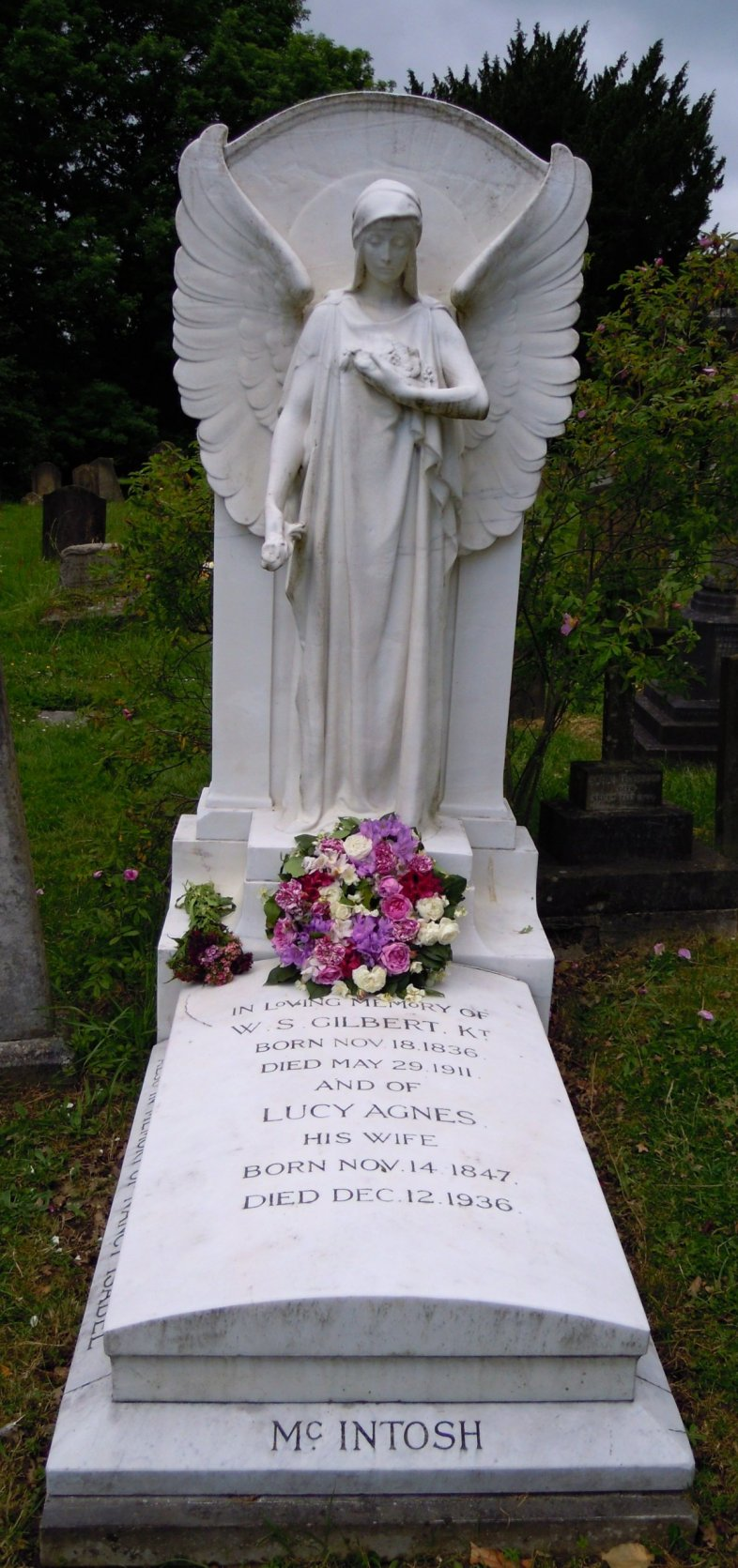
McIntosh's grave at Stanmore

After more than a decade away from the operatic stage, McIntosh returned, at Gilbert's request, to appear as Selene, the Fairy Queen, in Gilbert and Edward German's flop, Fallen Fairies, at the Savoy Theatre in 1909. The theatre's management attributed much of the blame for the failure of Fallen Fairies to McIntosh. Critics said that she was "too much a tragedy queen"; the sensuality required by the role was "not her sphere". The work's tedious libretto, however, was as much to blame. C. H. Workman, the opera's producer and lead comic, replaced McIntosh after the first week of the opera's run, incurring the wrath of Gilbert, who banned him from playing in any of his pieces in Britain. McIntosh never appeared in an opera again, although she may have had concert engagements.

== Retirement with the Gilberts ==
McIntosh lived with the Gilberts for the rest of their lives, at their home, Grim's Dyke, where she assisted Lady Gilbert as companion, secretary and hostess, and published some articles in the press about Gilbert's many and exotic pets. McIntosh's father lived in the north lodge on the property for the last years of his life. After Lady Gilbert died in 1936, McIntosh sold the house and moved to Knightsbridge, London. She succeeded Lady Gilbert as Vice-President of the Gilbert & Sullivan Society in London. Gilbert's entire estate, including the Garrick Theatre, passed from Lady Gilbert to McIntosh. She took part in a drive to raise funds for a proposed National Theatre, endowing a seat in Gilbert's name in 1938.

McIntosh died in London in 1954, and the remainder of the Gilbert estate went to the Royal General Theatrical Fund. This included stocks and revenues from the sale of Gilbert's papers to the British Museum and substantial royalties from the recordings of the Gilbert and Sullivan operas on the HMV and Decca labels. Her ashes were buried with those of Gilbert and Lady Gilbert in the churchyard at the Church of St. John the Evangelist in Stanmore.
