= Charles Kenningham =

English opera singer and actor (1860–1925)

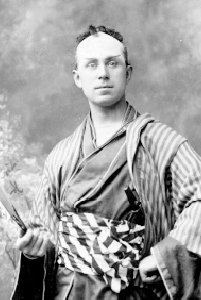
Kenningham as Nanki-Poo in The Mikado

Charles Kenningham (18 November 1860 – 24 October 1925) was an English opera singer and actor best remembered for his roles in the 1890s with the D'Oyly Carte Opera Company.

After singing as a boy soprano, Kenningham briefly served in the 5th Dragoon Guards. After nearly five years' service as a tenor at Canterbury Cathedral, he performed in Arthur Sullivan's grand opera Ivanhoe in 1891. He then became principal tenor with the D'Oyly Carte Opera Company until 1898. There he created several roles, including the tenor roles in the last two Gilbert and Sullivan operas. He was also a composer who had a number of songs published in the 1890s. From 1898 to 1906, he toured in Australia and New Zealand with the J. C. Williamson opera company.

== Early career ==
Kenningham was born in Hull, England. He began his musical career as a boy soprano soloist, at the age of eight, at Holy Trinity Church in Hull. Two years later he was principal boy chorister at St Paul's Cathedral in London, where he studied the organ with John Stainer. After his voice changed, he became the organist and choir master at St Luke's Church, Hull, at the age of fourteen. After an engagement with a short-lived stage company he enlisted in the 5th Dragoon Guards. With that military company, he travelled to Egypt in 1882, taking part in two engagements. He then returned to England, where he was stationed at York and gave organ recitals, earning enough from them to purchase his military discharge.

Kenningham's London stage debut was at the Adelphi Theatre in 1882 as Duvalor in a single matinée performance of Haydn Millars's operetta Mariette's Wedding. He was appointed principal tenor at Canterbury Cathedral, where he sang for almost five years. He went on to create the role of Maurice de Bracy in Sir Arthur Sullivan's grand opera, Ivanhoe, at the Royal English Opera House from January to July 1891.

== D'Oyly Carte Company ==
In August 1891 Kenningham joined a D'Oyly Carte Opera Company touring company as Indru in The Nautch Girl. He replaced Courtice Pounds as Indru at the Savoy Theatre in October 1891 before returning to the Royal English Opera House to play Jeban D'Eveille in La Basoche by André Messager, and reprising his role as de Bracy in Ivanhoe for six performances during November and December 1891. Kenningham rejoined D'Oyly Carte on tour in March 1892 in the role of the Reverend Harry Sandford in The Vicar of Bray. Returning to the Savoy Theatre in September 1892, he created the parts of Oswald in Haddon Hall, Tom in Jane Annie, and Captain Fitzbattleaxe in Gilbert and Sullivan's penultimate opera, Utopia, Limited.

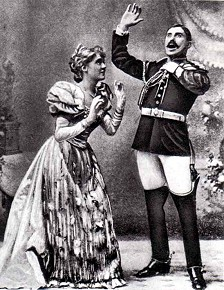
Nancy McIntosh and Kenningham in Utopia, Limited

When Courtice Pounds returned to the Savoy Theatre in July 1894 to take the tenor lead in Mirette, Kenningham rejoined the D'Oyly Carte touring company as Fitzbattleaxe until October 1894, leaving to create the part of Erling in W. S. Gilbert and Osmond Carr's His Excellency at the Lyric Theatre from October 1894 to April 1895. Kenningham returned to D'Oyly Carte in July 1895 to tour as Cyril in Princess Ida, Fitzbattleaxe in Utopia Limited, and Count Vasquez in The Chieftain.

Kenningham returned to the Savoy Theatre as Nanki-Poo in The Mikado in November 1895, a revival that lasted until March 1896, when he created the part of Ernest Dummkopf in the last Gilbert and Sullivan opera, The Grand Duke. He remained at the Savoy until May 1898, and appeared successively as Nanki-Poo from July 1896 to February 1897, Prince Max in His Majesty from February to April 1897, and Colonel Fairfax in The Yeomen of the Guard from May to November 1897. He played Fritz in D'Oyly Carte's revival of The Grand Duchess of Gerolstein, from December 1897 to March 1898, and Marco in The Gondoliers from March to May 1898.

== Songwriting and later years ==
In the 1890s Kenningham composed the music of several songs, including the ballad "Without thy love" (to lyrics written by a fellow D'Oyly Carte performer, Wallace Brownlow), "Scarborough Sal" and "I Dream of the Days". He wrote both the words and the music for "Can it be Love" and "Love of my Life 'tis You". His song "Since thou hast come", to lyrics by H Cornell, was sung by Ivor McKay at the inaugural concert of The Proms in August 1895.

From 1898 to 1906, Kenningham toured in Australia and New Zealand for J. C. Williamson, who had bought the rights to produce the Gilbert and Sullivan operas there from Richard D'Oyly Carte. Kenningham performed in the leading tenor roles in The Yeomen of the Guard, H.M.S. Pinafore, The Pirates of Penzance, The Sorcerer, Patience, Iolanthe, Princess Ida, The Mikado, The Gondoliers and Utopia, Limited. He also played Lancelot in La poupée in 1899 and Donegal in Florodora in 1900.

Kenningham died in Australia at the age of 64.
