= Wallace Brownlow =

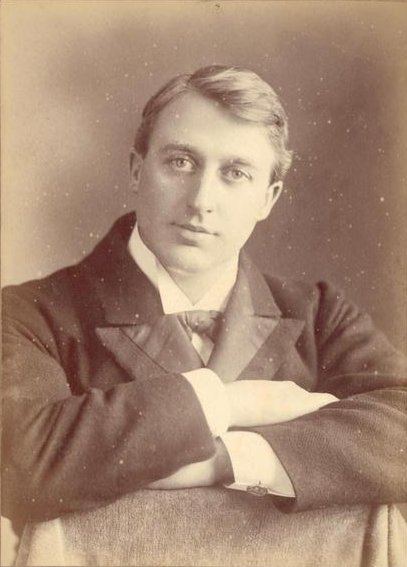
Wallace Brownlow

Wallace Brownlow (1861 – 7 September 1919) was an opera singer and actor of the Victorian era best known for baritone roles in the operas of Gilbert and Sullivan, first with the D'Oyly Carte Opera Company in the UK and on tour, and later with J. C. Williamson in Australia. He also appeared in other stage roles in London, New York, and elsewhere, and made some silent films in America.

Brownlow's adventures as a youth included an apprenticeship at sea, service with the Cape Mounted Rifles in South Africa, brief stints as a journalist, a banker and a gold miner, before being attracted to the stage. He performed with the D'Oyly Carte Opera Company from 1884 to 1891. There he had the opportunity to create the roles of Harrington Jarramie in Mrs. Jarramie's Genie, Lieutenant Cholmondeley in The Yeomen of the Guard (both in 1888) and Luiz in The Gondoliers (1889). He left the company to create the roles of Prince John in Arthur Sullivan's grand opera Ivanhoe and the Duc de Longueville in La Basoche (both in 1891). He next played in a number of comic operas in London through 1893, the year that he petitioned for divorce from his first wife, another member of the D'Oyly Carte.

With J. C. Williamson in Australia, Brownlow appeared in Ma mie Rosette (1894) and in a revival of H.M.S. Pinafore (1895). In 1900 he appeared in more Gilbert and Sullivan roles in Australia, and as The Sultan in The Rose of Persia, Abercoed in Florodora, and in A Trip to Chinatown. In 1902 he was injured by falling through a door and recovered substantial damages. Still in Australia, he wrote the lyrics for several songs, but his alcoholism contributed to his failure in a venture managing a hotel. He took his family to the United States by 1904, where he appeared in several Broadway productions of comic operas and in some silent films. He returned to Australia, but his alcoholism soon ended his career, and he committed suicide there in 1919.

== Early life ==
Brownlow was born in Westminster, London, in 1861, one of five children of Charlotte née Burrough (1831–1891) and Edward Brownlow (1823–1891). In 1861 his father was a Sergeant in the Coldstream Guards, and by 1871 he was a Drill Master for the Chelsea Pensioners and the Yeoman of the Queen's Bodyguard.

In an 1894 interview for the magazine Table Talk in Melbourne, Australia, Brownlow said that in 1874, aged 13, he left home as an apprentice on a 600-ton brig on a journey to Adelaide, remaining at sea until 1877 including a period aboard HMS Active off the Zulu Coast. In South Africa he tried his hand at vine cultivation but after a few months he joined the Cape Mounted Rifles, aged 17. As he looked old enough and could ride, the authorities did not insist upon the production of his birth certificate. Brownlow saw some service in the Baphuti campaign and was present at the capture of chief Morosi. When in September 1880 the Basuto rebellion broke out Brownlow, then a corporal, found himself among a detachment of 200 men besieged at Mafeteng by 6,000 Basutos under the command of chief Lorothodi. Brownlow received a gunshot wound and was promoted to sergeant. His gallant action at Ramabidikives village in February 1881 gained him a commission to lieutenant. Lieutenant Colonel Edward Brabant wrote in his dispatch:

I wish particularly to bring to notice the name of Sergeant Wallace Brownlow, Cape Mounted Rifles who commanded the scouts, and by whose courage and intelligence in keeping me thoroughly informed of the movements of the enemy up to the moment of the charge I was enabled to place the men in the position most favourable to receive the enemy's attack. Sergeant Brownlow came in with the Basutos, one of them falling dead upon him and covering him with blood.

As Sir Richard Cholmondeley in The Yeomen of the Guard, 1888

When the war ended in 1881 Brownlow left the Cape Mounted Rifles and became a journalist on the staff of an Orange Free State newspaper published half in Dutch and half in English. Making a little money he returned to England, enjoyed a holiday, and then, to please his father, took a position in a banking house in London. A month's trial convinced him to leave banking, and he went to Canada to visit his brother in Montreal before starting on a gold mining expedition to the Lake of the Woods, but the venture failed. By late 1883 Brownlow was back in London where he saw an advertisement offering to launch amateur performers who wished to turn professional, on payment of a £5 fee. Brownlow paid the fee and made his first appearance on a stage as a comic policeman at the Imperial Theatre in Westminster. The show failed, but it gave Brownlow the advantage of being able to state that he had some stage experience.

== D'Oyly Carte Opera Company ==
Brownlow joined a D'Oyly Carte Opera Company touring company in 1884 and was assigned to the chorus. On 22 March 1884 he married fellow D'Oyly Carte member Sarah "Siddie" Symons (c. 1857–1911). He travelled to the United States in 1885 in the chorus of The Mikado with D'Oyly Carte's first American Mikado company in New York City and Boston, Massachusetts. He next toured Germany and Austria with D'Oyly Carte in 1886. During this tour, Brownlow appeared as the Foreman of the Jury in Trial by Jury, his first principal role. He first appeared at the Savoy Theatre in London in the chorus in the original 1887 production of Ruddigore. As the understudy to Richard Temple, Brownlow played the character of Sir Roderick Murgatroyd in August 1887.

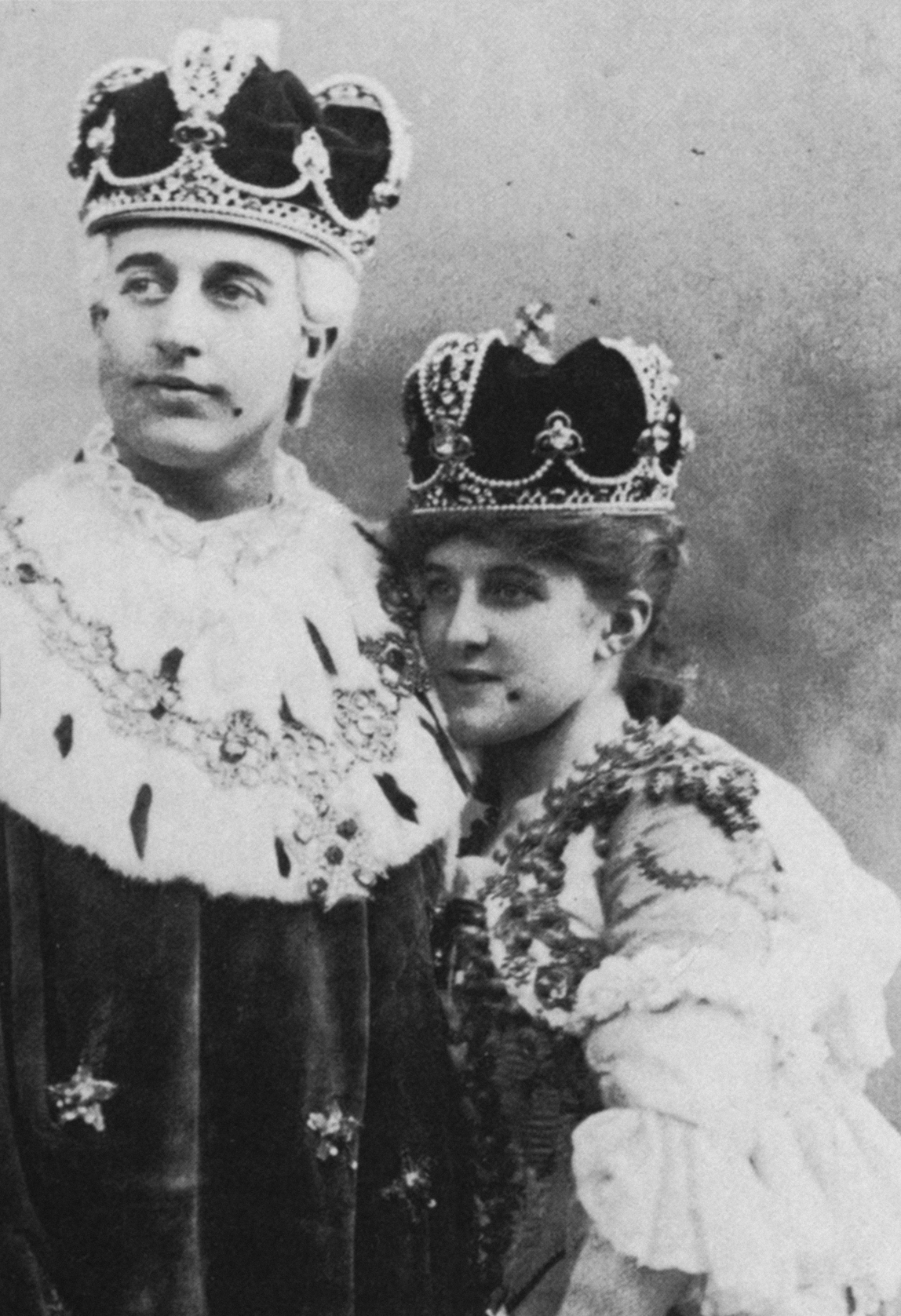
With Decima Moore as Luiz and Casilda in The Gondoliers

Brownlow continued in the chorus at the Savoy Theatre during the first London revivals of H.M.S. Pinafore, The Pirates of Penzance, and The Mikado. A one-act comic opera, Mrs. Jarramie's Genie, written by Frank Desprez and composed by Alfred Cellier and his brother Francois was the curtain raiser for these revivals, beginning in February 1888, and Brownlow created the role of the retired upholsterer, Harrington Jarramie.

Brownlow created the role of Sir Richard Cholmondeley, the Lieutenant of the Tower of London in the next Savoy opera, The Yeomen of the Guard, in 1888 at the Savoy Theatre. Coincidentally, his father had been Drill Master of the Yeomen of the Queen's Body Guard. He next created the role of Luiz in The Gondoliers, which he played from the opera's premiere in December 1889 until April 1891.

Brownlow left the D'Oyly Carte Opera Company to play Prince John in Arthur Sullivan's grand opera Ivanhoe and as the Duc de Longueville in La Basoche at the Royal English Opera House (both 1891). He next played in a number of comic operas in London through 1893, including the role of William in Blue-Eyed Susan, composed by F. Osmond Carr, at the Prince of Wales's Theatre in 1892. By this time Brownlow's marriage had deteriorated because of his serial infidelity. In 1893 he petitioned for divorce citing his wife's supposed adultery, charges she denied; she counter-petitioned in 1894 citing his alleged adultery with various women, charges he denied.

== Australia, US, and later years ==
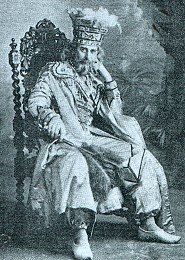
Brownlow as The Sultan in The Rose of Persia

Brownlow then travelled to Australia to work for J. C. Williamson, appearing in the 1894 production of Ma mie Rosette, with Nellie Stewart and in an 1895 revival of H.M.S. Pinafore in Sydney. In Australia in January 1897 he married Rhoda Ruth Janette Hay (1871–1958) and with her had a daughter, Dorothy Rhoda Brownlow (1897–1992). It is uncertain whether he was actually divorced from his first wife. In 1900 he appeared in both Sydney and Melbourne in H.M.S. Pinafore, The Pirates of Penzance, Iolanthe, and The Gondoliers as Giuseppe. Also in 1900 he played The Sultan in Arthur Sullivan's The Rose of Persia; Abercoed in Florodora; the title role in The Mikado; and appeared in A Trip to Chinatown. By 1901 his first wife, Siddie, was in a workhouse in Hampshire. She was moved to the workhouse's insane asylum in 1911 and died within weeks.

In 1902 Brownlow was injured by falling through a door and recovered substantial damages. Brownlow's alcoholism contributed to his failure in a venture managing a hotel in Western Australia. Stewart wrote in her memoirs of Brownlow's great success with Australian audiences, the "ease and grace and dash" that he brought to his roles, his huge popularity with the women who pursued him, and of his weakness for alcohol that led to his unhappy end. While living in Australia, Brownlow wrote the lyrics for several songs, including those to the ballad "Without Thy Love", the music to which was written by fellow D'Oyly Carte artiste Charles Kenningham.

With his wife and daughter Brownlow then migrated to the United States, where he appeared in several Broadway productions of comic operas, appearing as Sergeant Bob Trivet in Love's Lottery (1904); in Giroflé-Girofla from January to February 1905, and in Boccaccio in March 1905. Later, theatrical manager Hugh D. McIntosh found Brownlow in California, where he had gone to act in silent films, including the 1913 movie The Hoyden's Awakening, now living in dereliction, and brought him back to Australia under contract, but he soon "lapsed into his old habit".

== Suicide ==
Brownlow committed suicide by cutting his throat while staying in the Carlton Gardens, Melbourne, Australia in September 1919. He was survived by his wife and daughter in California. In a letter addressed to the coroner "and any inquirers" he wrote:

What I have done I have been driven to by continuous boycotting by every theatrical management. I am penniless, and have been asked to leave this hotel because I cannot pay my rent. There's only one way out; I've tried for every kind of work without any success, and being very tired of it all I have decided to take myself to my great Judge, who, I know, will be more merciful than my fellow beings.
