= Arthur Playfair =

English actor and singer (1869–1918)

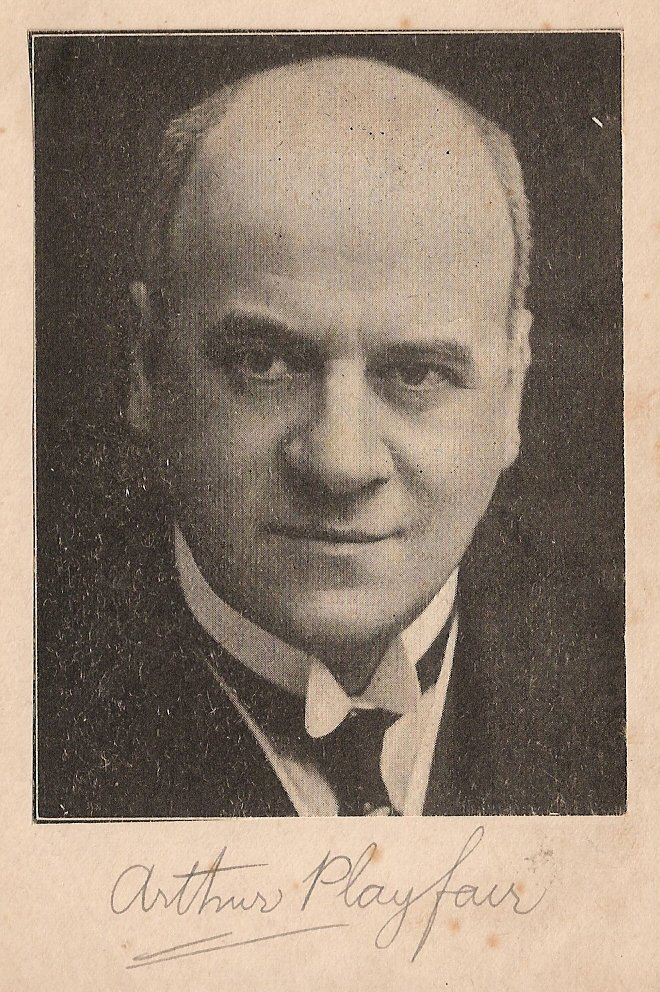
Arthur Playfair in 1915

Arthur Wyndham Playfair (20 October 1869 – 28 August 1918) was an English actor and singer. Beginning in Victorian burlesque and comic operas, Playfair became known for his roles in Edwardian musical comedy and, later, in musical revues.

== Biography ==
Playfair was born in Ellichpur, India. He first appeared on the London stage in December 1887. He went on to create roles in the Victorian burlesque Cinder Ellen up too Late (1891); the comic opera The Mountebanks (1892) by Alfred Cellier and W. S. Gilbert; as Sir Reddan Tapeleigh, with Jessie Bond, in the musical comedy Go-Bang (1894) by Adrian Ross and F. Osmond Carr; and the comic opera His Excellency (1895) by Gilbert and Carr. He created the role of Butler in The Man from Blankley's (1903 at the Prince of Wales Theatre, reprising the role in the 1906 revival at the Haymarket Theatre) to much success.

Arthur Playfair, Robert Averell, Yvonne Arnaud and Alec Fraser in the original production of The Girl in the Taxi (1912)

In 1911, he starred in the title role in Preserving Mr. Panmure. He then starred as Baron Dauvray in The Girl in the Taxi (1912). He toured the United States in 1901 and 1903, in the latter year appearing in The Man from Blankley's at the Criterion Theatre in New York with Charles Hawtrey, and also appearing there as Bernard Mandeville in Letty in 1904.

During World War I he appeared in a series of hit revues. In 1914, he played in the successful The Passing Show at the Palace Theatre, London, followed the next year by Bric-a-Brac and in 1916 in Vanity Fair, both at the Palace. He appeared in the silent film Judged by Appearances in 1916. In 1917, he appeared in another successful revue, Bubbly, at the Comedy Theatre, London, followed, in 1918–19, by another hit, Tails Up, at the same theatre.

Playfair married the actress Lena Ashwell OBE in 1896; he began divorce proceedings in 1903 following her adultery with Robert Taber, the former husband of actress Julia Marlowe. Playfair and Ashwell finally divorced in 1908, the divorce proceedings revealing that he also committed adultery and domestic violence, was an alcoholic and passed on venereal disease to his wife. He was the cousin of the actor Nigel Playfair.

Playfair died aged 48 in 1918 in Brighton, England.
