= His Excellency (opera) =

Comic opera by W. S. Gilbert and F. Osmond Carr

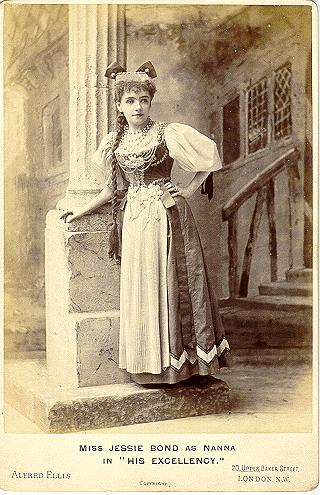
Jessie Bond as Nanna

His Excellency is a two-act comic opera with a libretto by W. S. Gilbert and music by F. Osmond Carr. The piece concerns a practical-joking governor whose pranks threaten to make everyone miserable, until the Prince Regent kindly foils the governor's plans. Towards the end of the Gilbert and Sullivan partnership, Arthur Sullivan declined to write the music for this piece after Gilbert insisted on casting his protege, Nancy McIntosh, in the lead role; Sullivan and producer Richard D'Oyly Carte, proprietor of the Savoy Theatre, did not feel that McIntosh was adequate.

The opera premiered instead under the management of George Edwardes in 1894 at the Lyric Theatre, running for 162 performances. It starred many of the Savoy Theatre regulars, such as George Grossmith, Rutland Barrington and Jessie Bond, as well as Ellaline Terriss, who was to become a major West End star. It was also produced in New York in 1895, and in German translation at the Carltheater, Vienna, in both 1895 and 1897. The opera also enjoyed a British provincial tour.

== Background ==
From the late 1870s through the 1880s, Gilbert wrote a series of successful comic operas, working almost exclusively with Arthur Sullivan. The Gilbert and Sullivan partnership dissolved for several years after the production of The Gondoliers (1889), because of a financial dispute, but in 1893 they reunited to write Utopia, Limited. Encouraged by the modest success of this piece, the two agreed to write a new piece. In January 1894, Gilbert was ready with the scenario for a libretto that would become His Excellency, and which he hoped Sullivan would set to music. But the two collaborators disagreed over the casting of the leading lady. Gilbert insisted on using his protege, Nancy McIntosh, in the part, who had played the heroine in Utopia. Sullivan and producer Richard D'Oyly Carte, along with many of the critics, had found her unimpressive and did not want her in any more of his operas. The two men were not able to settle their differences, and Gilbert and Sullivan once again had to find different partners.

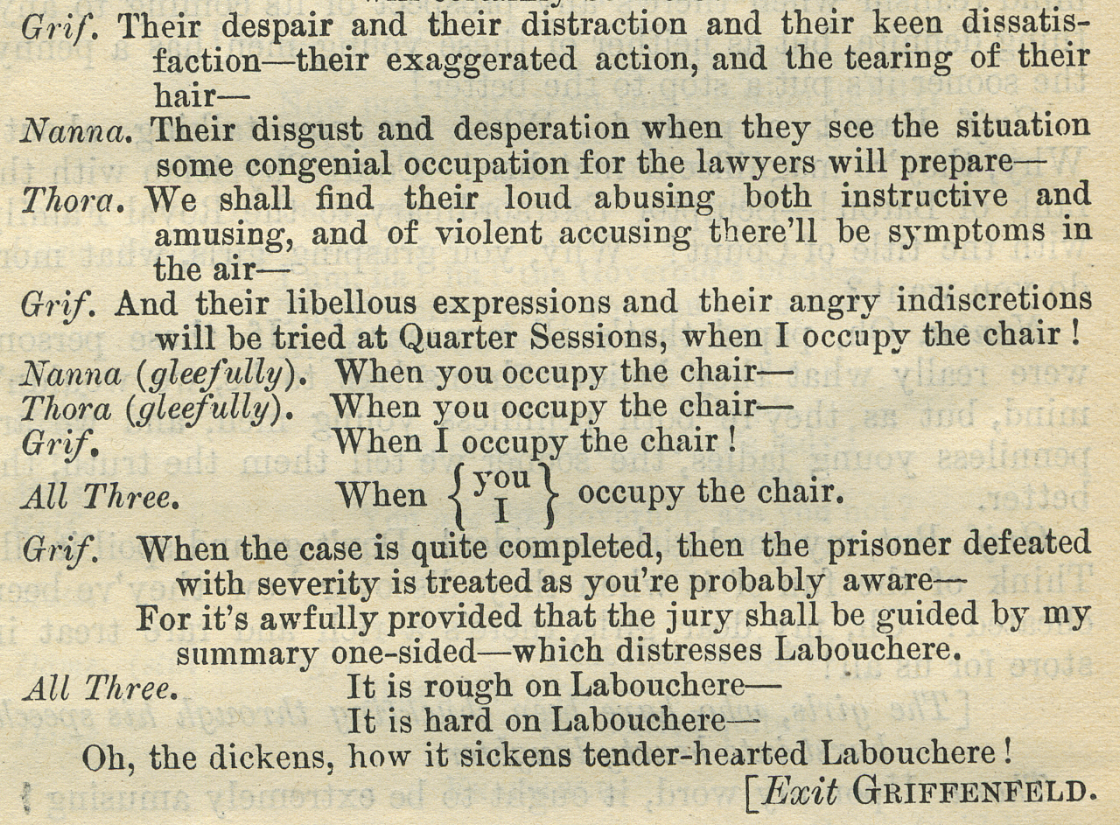
Third verse of "When a gentleman supposes" from His Excellency, Act II

By 1894, the popular trend on the London stage had moved from traditional comic opera to a new genre, musical comedy, with such shows as The Gaiety Girl becoming quickly popular. Gilbert added elements of the new genre to his later works. In the case of His Excellency, after approaching George Henschel unsuccessfully, Gilbert selected Carr as the composer for the new piece. Carr had enjoyed success in musical comedy, with In Town (1892), Morocco Bound (1893) and Go-Bang (1894), but critics inevitably found him inferior to Sullivan.

In His Excellency, among other satiric targets, Gilbert ridicules Henry Labouchère's claims to impartiality in the song "When a gentleman supposes". Labouchère, whose lover Henrietta Hodson feuded with Gilbert in 1877, had been a frequent theatrical critic of Gilbert's. Labouchère founded a personal weekly journal, Truth, in 1877, in which he pursued his anti-semitic, anti-suffrage and anti-homosexual social agenda. The journal was often sued for libel.

== Productions ==
The original production at the Lyric Theatre in London opened on 27 October 1894, and closed on 6 April 1895 after 162 performances. For the cast of His Excellency, Gilbert was able to engage former Savoy opera stalwarts George Grossmith, Rutland Barrington, Alice Barnett, Charles Kenningham and Jessie Bond, as well as John Le Hay and the young musical comedy star, Ellaline Terriss. Many of the choristers from the Savoy Theatre, who had been disappointed with the recent short run of Mirette there, joined Gilbert's production, and Helen Carte accused Gilbert of poaching the D'Oyly Carte chorus. Choreography was by John D'Auban, and costumes were by Percy Anderson.

His Excellency premiered at the Lyric Theatre, London, under the management of George Edwardes, on 27 October 1894. The production and libretto received enthusiastic notices, though the score met a mixed reception. After the opera opened, Gilbert wrote to Helen Carte, "if it had had the benefit of your expensive friend Sullivan's music, it would have been a second Mikado" (quoted in Wolfson 1976, p. 65). The London run of just over five months (162 performances, closing on 6 April 1895), cut short because of an influenza epidemic, was a disappointment. Nevertheless, the opera had a respectable provincial tour and a Broadway production opening at the former Broadway Theatre on 14 October 1895, which ran for 88 performances.

== Roles ==
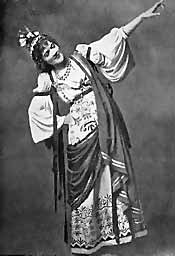
Nancy McIntosh as Christina

Role	Voice type	Premiere cast 27 October 1894
The Prince Regent, disguised as Nils Egilsson, a strolling player	lyric baritone	Rutland Barrington
George Griffenfeld, Governor of Elsinore, a practical joker	comic baritone	George Grossmith
Erling Sykke, a young sculptor	tenor	Charles Kenningham
Dr. Tortenssen, a young physician	baritone	Augustus Cramer
Mats Munck, Syndic of Elsinore	comic baritone	John Le Hay
Harold, Corporal of the King's Hussars	bass	Arthur Playfair
A sentry	bass-baritone	George Temple
First officer	speaking role	Ernest Snow
Second officer	speaking role	Frank Morton
Christina, a ballad singer	soprano	Nancy McIntosh
Nanna, Griffenfeld's daughter	mezzo-soprano	Jessie Bond
Thora, Griffenfeld's daughter	soprano	Ellaline Terriss
Dame Hecla Cortlandt, a lady of property, engaged to Griffenfeld	contralto	Alice Barnett
Blanca, a vivandière	mezzo-soprano	Gertrude Aylward
Elsa, a peasant girl	speaking role	May Cross

== Synopsis ==
Contemporary press cartoon showing Gilbert with Grossmith

The scene is laid in Elsinore, Denmark, in 1801.

=== Act I ===
The people of Elsinore celebrate a newly unveiled statue of the Prince Regent. Its creator, Erling Sykke, has been named Sculptor to the Royal Family. After the townspeople leave, Christina remains, transfixed. She tells Erling that she is in love with the statue. Erling's friend, Dr. Tortenssen, has been named Physician to the King. The two men are in love with Nanna and Thora, the daughters of Elsinore's governor, George Griffenfeld. Until now, the girls have scornfully refused the two suitors' advances. The young men hope for better luck, now that they have secured royal appointments. Nanna and Thora appear, and they appear receptive to the men's entreaties. But after the men leave, the girls admit that the appointments are a practical joke, one of many their father has perpetrated on the citizens of Elsinore.

The King's Hussars enter, led by Corporal Harold. The Governor has compelled them to dance like ballet-girls every day from 10 to 2. Griffenfeld joins them, and chastises the Hussars for their lack of a sense of humour. He admits to Harold, however, that one of his practical jokes has backfired. Just for fun, he had proposed marriage to the extraordinarily wealthy Dame Hecla Cortlandt. He now wants to break off the engagement, but he fears her dangerous temper. When she arrives, Griffenfeld asks her what she would do if, hypothetically, his proposal turned out to be a ruse. Her angry reply leaves him terrified. With his two daughters, he plots to trick Mats Munck, the local Syndic, into believing that Dame Cortlandt wants to marry Munck.

After they leave, the Prince Regent appears, in disguise, dressed as a "tattered vagabond". He has received many complaints about Griffenfeld's behaviour from the citizens of Elsinore, and he wants to see for himself if they are true. He encounters Christina, who is struck by his resemblance to the statue, but he tells her that he is a mere strolling player, Nils Egilsson. After she leaves, he encounters Griffenfeld, who also notices the resemblance. Seeing another opportunity for a practical joke, Griffenfeld asks "Egilsson" to impersonate the Prince Regent – dispensing fake honours to the townspeople, which will later be revealed as amusing hoaxes. Christina overhears their agreement, but left alone with the Regent once again, promises not to divulge their secret.

Mats Munck has a meeting with Dame Cortlandt, in which she believes she is consulting him on arrangements for her marriage with Griffenfeld, but Mats believes that she plans to marry him. Dame Cortlandt finds his behaviour incomprehensible. Erling and Tortenssen now learn that their court appointments are a sham. Nanna and Thora reject their marriage proposals, given their impoverished status. Fed up with Griffenfeld's incessant practical jokes, Erling and Tortenssen assemble the townspeople, and are joined by Dame Cortlandt, who has realised what is going on, and they plan to go to Copenhagen to complain to the Prince personally. When Griffenfeld arrives, he tells them that the Regent is already in Elsinore to hear their complaints. The chorus are jubilant that their grievances will finally be heard, while Griffenfeld and his daughters pretend to be alarmed and to beg for mercy.

=== Act II ===
The people of Elsinore await their audience with the Regent. Mats Munck has drawn up their complaints in a formal legal document. Christina assures them that she foresees the Governor's downfall. Nanna and Thora beg forgiveness for their father, but the crowd will have none of it. Finally, the Regent arrives in a great ceremony. As evidence of the Governor's practical jokes, Harold and the Hussars dance a ballet for him. The Regent announces that Erling and Tortenssen's previous appointments are confirmed, and they are elevated to the nobility. Corporal Harold is promoted to Colonel, Mats Munck is promoted to Governor, and Griffenfeld is degraded to the rank of Private. Lastly, he commands that Erling and Tortenssen marry Griffenfeld's daughters, and he invites the whole village to a banquet at the castle. After the chorus have left, Griffenfeld tells "Egilsson" that he is pleased with how well the joke is working. He ignores that his joke on Dame Cortlandt backfired.

Harold is enjoying his new rank. He and Blanca decide to write a three-volume novel about their lives. Meanwhile, Dame Cortlandt once again confronts Mats Munck. She insists that she was engaged to the Governor. Now that Mats is Governor, she is engaged to him, but now he is not interested. Mats asks a nearby sentry if he is obliged to marry her. Griffenfeld changes places with the sentry, and says that he must. Griffenfeld is delighted that, once again, all of his practical jokes are working beautifully, but his daughters are starting to feel some remorse over their treatment of Erling and Tortenssen. The new nobles make a pretence of behaving haughtily towards the young ladies, but soon crumble before the feminine tears. Left alone, the girls finally admit that they have real feelings for the men.

Everyone gathers for the weddings, but Griffenfeld abruptly announces that the Regent's visit was a sham, and all of the honours he dispensed were practical jokes. But "Egilsson" turns the tables, and announces that he is the real Regent. All of the honours are to become permanent, and likewise Griffenfeld's demotion to the rank of Private is confirmed. The Regent asks Christina to marry him, and all of the couples are happily united.

== Musical numbers ==
Act I

- 1. Set the merry bunting flying – Erling, Christina
- 2. When I bestow my bosom's store – Erling
- 3. Oh my goodness, here's the nobility! – Nanna and Thora
- 4. If all is as you say – Nanna, Thora, Erling and Tortenssen
- 5. Here are the warriors all ablaze – Chorus of Girls
- 6. Now what would I do if you proved untrue – Dame and Governor
- 7. Oh what a fund of joy – Nanna, Thora and Governor
- 8. A King who is pestered with cares – Regent
- 9. Now if you would atone – Regent and Governor with Christina
- 10. Now all that we've agreed upon, O – Dame and Syndic
- 11. My wedded life – Nanna
- 12. Finale: Come hither, ev'ry one – Company

Act II

- 1. With anger stern ... A hive of bees, as I've heard say – Chorus; Christina and Regent
- 2. Quixotic is his enterprise – Governor
- 3. There once was a corporal bold – Harold and Blanca
- 4. One day the Syndic of this town – Syndic, Dame, Sentry and Griffenfeld
- 5. When a gentleman supposes – Nanna, Thora and Governor
- 6. So this is how you'd have us sue you – Thora, Nanna, Erling and Tortenssen
- 7. Ring the bells and bang the brasses! – Chorus
- 8. Finale: Now all that we've agreed upon, O – Company

== Critical reception ==
The Times praised Gilbert's libretto, rating it his best since The Mikado. The paper thought Carr's music an inferior copy of the Sullivan style, but nevertheless better than "that more vulgar mould in which he has found favour with the purveyors of variety entertainments." The paper judged the cast "exceptionally strong". Its comments on Nancy McIntosh accorded, to some degree, with Sullivan's: "[She] has of late made rapid progress and has become an actress of decided skill and charm, though her voice and singing are scarcely as good as they were when she came out." The Manchester Guardian concurred, attributing the "undeniable triumph" of the piece solely to Gilbert's "inventive genius as a librettist and stage manager." The Saturday Review rated Gilbert's libretto "a pretty fair specimen" of "genuine Gilbertian humour", but lamented the absence of Sullivan; of Carr's contribution, it said, "the music is neat, easy, the technical writing skilful, the orchestration correct; in fact there is nothing wrong with it. And this is the gravest reproach one can make to a writer of opéra-bouffe music – plenty should be the matter with it." The critic of The Theatre disagreed with the positive assessments, calling the libretto "the worst that Mr. Gilbert ever wrote – worse even than The Mountebanks, which was bad enough."

== See also ==
- Bibliography of W.S. Gilbert
