= Heyland =

Heyland is a surname. Notable people with the surname include:

- Jean-Christophe Heyland (1791–1866), Swiss artist
- Michael Heyland, British theatre director and actor
- Rob Heyland (born 1954), British actor and screenwriter

== See also ==
- Heyland diagram, a type of circle diagram
