= Richard Cholmondeley =

English knight and Lieutenant of the Tower of London

Wallace Brownlow portraying Richard Cholmondeley in The Yeomen of the Guard, 1888

Sir Richard Cholmondeley (or Cholmeley) (c. 1460–1521) was an English farmer and soldier who served as Lieutenant of the Tower of London from 1513 to 1520 during the reign of Henry VIII. He is remembered because of his tomb at the Tower of London and because he is fictionalised as a character in Gilbert and Sullivan's darkly comic opera, The Yeomen of the Guard. Cholmeley's name has frequently been misspelled "Cholmondeley" because of its misspelling in the plaque on his tomb, which led to the misspelling of the character's name in the opera; other branches of Cholmeley's family use the longer spelling.

Knighted in 1497 for valour in battle against the Scots, Cholmeley continued to serve as a soldier until 1513, becoming entrusted with many positions of responsibility for the security of castles and fortifications in England. He was successful as a farmer and a shrewd investor in land, much increasing his family wealth. As Lieutenant of the Tower of London, he drew criticism for his reaction to the Evil May Day riots of 1517, when he ordered the firing of some of the Tower's artillery at the city to suppress rioting. He was also responsible for the rebuilding of the chapel of St Peter ad Vincula at the Tower. His illegitimate son, Roger Cholmeley, became Lord Chief Justice of the Court of King's Bench.

== Life and career ==
Cholmeley (pronounced "Chumley") was born at Chorley, a small settlement approximately six miles south west of Nantwich, Cheshire, near Cholmondeley, the eldest son of Joan Eyton and John Cholmeley, wealthy sheep farmers and land owners. See the heading "Tomb and Family Name" below, regarding the family name. While Richard was very young, his family moved to East Yorkshire, where his maternal grandfather held extensive estates.

=== Early career ===
Cholmeley was appointed Bailiff of York in 1492 and High Sheriff of Northumberland in 1495. In 1497, he served under Thomas Howard, Earl of Surrey, to repel a Scots assault at Norham Castle, a stronghold of the Bishopric of Durham. For his service, Cholmeley was knighted in the field at Ayton by Lord Surrey as representative of the king. In the same year, he was appointed Lieutenant of Berwick upon Tweed and Governor of Kingston upon Hull. In 1499, Cholmeley and his younger brother Roger were appointed Constables of Pickering Castle, North Yorkshire and Stewards of the Honour and Foresters of the Royal Forest. While Roger settled in the constable's lodgings at the castle, Sir Richard purchased a small estate and house at nearby Thornton on the Hill (now part of Thornton-le-Dale). In 1506, Cholmeley was appointed Collector of the Great Custom in the Port of London.

In 1513, the Scots invaded England to meet their treaty obligations to France under the Auld Alliance. At the Battle of Flodden, the English, including a Cheshire levy under Cholmeley's command, successfully repelled the Scots. He had brought with him the Citizen Yeomenry of Hull. With the English victory, Lord Surrey was restored as Duke of Norfolk.

=== Lieutenant of the Tower ===
In October 1513, Cholmeley was appointed Lieutenant of the Tower of London and Supervisor General of Richmond Castle and eleven other Yorkshire castles and manors. There was no suitable house for Cholmeley and his family within the Tower precincts, and so he purchased a house in nearby Barking, where he lived while serving as Lieutenant of the Tower. The Lieutenant served under the Constable of the Tower, at the time Thomas Lovell. The duties of the Lieutenant included defence, organising the ordnance based in the Tower, helping to sending supplies and equipment to the English army in France, maintenance of the Tower, and custody of the prisoners at the Tower, including escorting prisoners of note to trial at Westminster Hall which, at that time, housed the courts of law. Cholmeley's maintenance works included the complete rebuilding of the chapel of St Peter ad Vincula, the parish church of the Tower of London, which had been largely destroyed by fire in 1512. The construction was carried out in 1519–20.

Scene from The Yeomen of the Guard

Cholmeley lost some favour with the City of London authorities because of his reaction to the Evil May Day riots of 1517. During the riots, he furiously ordered the firing of some of the Tower's artillery into the city during rioting by gangs of young Londoners, who attacked foreigners, especially the wealthy foreign merchants and bankers of Lombard Street, London and who took control of London for several days. This drew the ire of the city elders. In 1520, he resigned his post at the Tower due to ill health. He died in March 1521 (1522 by the modern calendar system) in St Katharine's by the Tower.

Cholmeley is the only historical character to appear in a Gilbert and Sullivan opera, The Yeomen of the Guard. In the story of that opera, while serving as Lieutenant of the Tower, Cholmeley finds that a prominent prisoner, scheduled to be executed, has escaped. He launches a full-scale investigation.

== Legacy ==
Cholmeley became very wealthy by inheritance and shrewd property investments. At the time of his death, he held extensive estates in Northumberland, Cumberland, Yorkshire, Cambridgeshire, Essex, Middlesex, Kent and Calais, along with several properties in London. By his will dated 26 December 1521, he left the bulk of his estate to his widow, Elizabeth (nee Pennington), with bequests to his only issue, his illegitimate son, named Roger. Cholmeley willed specific items of value to his younger brother, also named Roger.

Cholmeley's widow, Elizabeth, later married her third husband, Sir William Gascoigne of Cardington, Bedfordshire (her first husband was Sir Walter Strickland of Sizergh). She died in 1546. His illegitimate son, Roger Cholmeley, enrolled at Lincoln's Inn to study law in 1506, eventually becoming Recorder of the City of London (from 1535 to 1545), a member of parliament and Chief Baron of the Exchequer (from 1545). He was knighted in 1534. In May 1552, he was appointed as Chief Justice of the King's Bench. He was Lord Chief Justice for only a year because Queen Mary I would not reappoint him. Also in 1552, he was imprisoned for six weeks in the Tower of London and fined for signing Lady Jane Grey's instrument of succession as Queen. He returned to work as a barrister and was a member of parliament for Middlesex in the early 1550s. Roger died in 1565, survived by two daughters. He is possibly best remembered for his endowment to found a free grammar school, Highgate School, in London.

Cholmeley's brother, Roger, had a son whom he named Richard, whose descendants are the Cholmeleys of Roxby, Bramston and Whitby. This is the line of the baronets of Easton in Grantham, Lincolnshire. Cholmeley's cousin, Richard Cholmondeley of Cholmondeley, Cheshire, was married to Elizabeth Brereton of Malpas, whose brother, William Brereton, was executed in 1536 on suspicion of being Anne Boleyn's lover. That branch of the family's descendants, beginning with Sir Hugh Cholmondeley, included the Marquesses and Earls of Cholmondeley.

== Tomb and family name ==
In 1522, following the reconstruction of St. Peter ad Vincula, a tomb was erected in the church, adorned with effigies of Cholmeley and his wife. The monument is one of the oldest in the chapel, where many famous people who were executed at the Tower are buried. The alabaster effigies lie fenced in ironwork under the central arcade.

However, Cholmeley is not buried in this tomb. In his will, he requests that he be buried "within the Chapel of our blessed Lady of Barking beside the Tower of London" (now called "All Hallows, Barking") and that if the Masters and Wardens would not agree, then "my body be buried in the Church of the Crutched Friars beside the Tower of London" (now called "St. Olaf's"). All Hallows was almost totally destroyed during the Blitz of London during World War II, and so it is not known whether he was buried there or at St. Olaf's. There is some evidence that he may have been buried in one of the tombs of the Cholmondeley, Cheshire, branch of his family.

Cholmeley's family can be traced back to the 12th century Robert de Chelmundelegh, second son of William le Belward, who inherited parts of the Barony of Malpas (for which Malpas is named), including Cholmondeley, Cheshire, previously held by Robert Fitzhugh. Over the centuries, the family name was spelled in many variants as middle-English developed away from French influences. Different branches of the family spell the name differently, and Cholmeley's most famous cousins, of Cholmondeley, Cheshire, spell the name "Cholmondeley".

In Victorian times, Sir Richard's tomb in St. Peter ad Vincula was relocated and had a new name panel fitted. The panel states that the Lieutenant of the Tower was named Richard "Cholmondeley". Thus, Gilbert and Sullivan called him "Sir Richard Cholmondeley". However, Sir Richard's father was John Cholmeley, his grandfather was William Cholmeley, and his brother was Roger Cholmeley. His will is signed Richard Cholmeley, and his illegitimate son was Sir Roger Cholmeley. After the Cholmondeley branch of the family became the more highly titled branch, Sir Richard Cholmeley, Lieutenant of the Tower, was confused with his cousin, Richard Cholmondeley of Cholmondeley, Cheshire, or one of the five knights named Richard Cholmondeley, Chomondley or Cholmeley living around the same time.
