= Utopia, Limited =

1893 comic opera by Gilbert & Sullivan

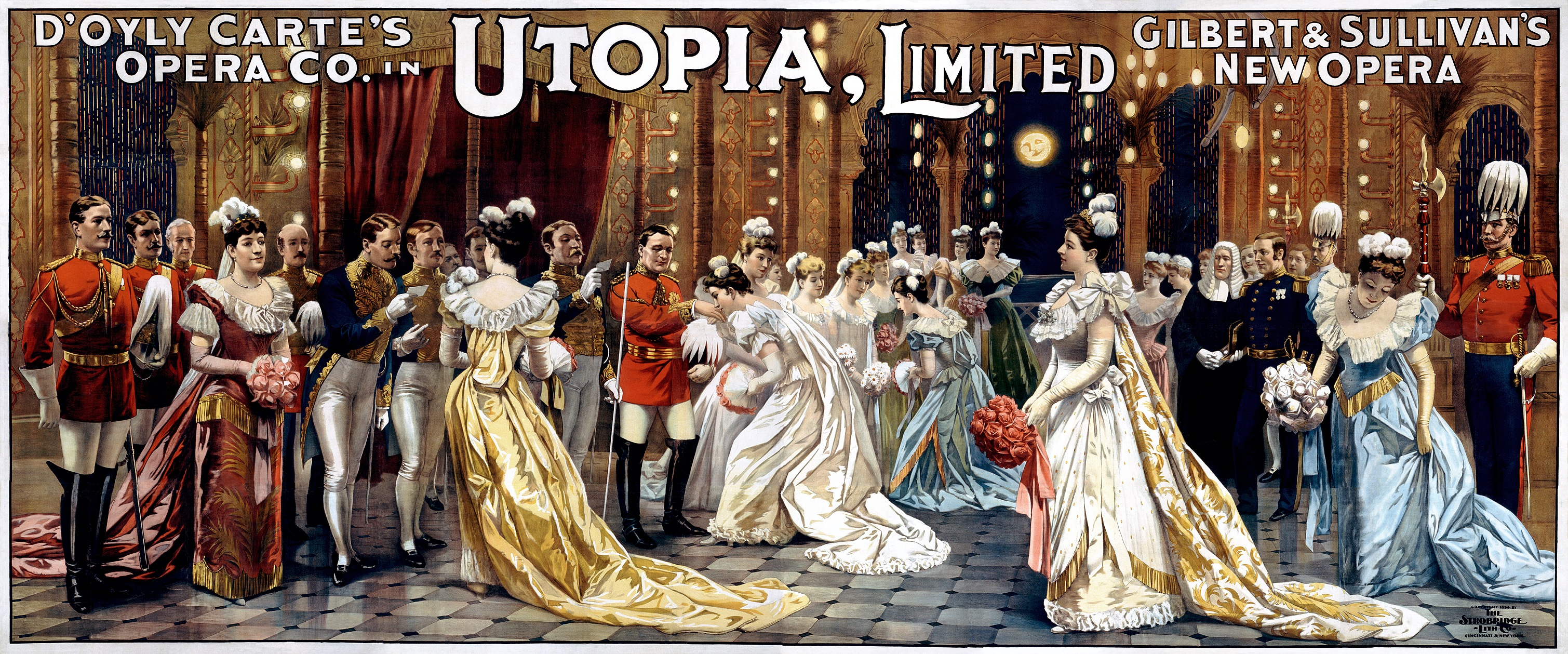
Early advertisement showing the drawing room scene

Utopia, Limited; or, The Flowers of Progress, is a Savoy opera, with music by Arthur Sullivan and libretto by W. S. Gilbert. It was the next-to-last of Gilbert and Sullivan's fourteen collaborations, premiering on 7 October 1893 for a run of 245 performances. It did not achieve the success of most of their earlier productions.

Gilbert's libretto satirises limited liability companies, and particularly the idea that a bankrupt company could leave creditors unpaid without any liability on the part of its owners. It also lampoons the Joint Stock Company Act by imagining the absurd convergence of natural persons (or sovereign nations) with legal commercial entities under the limited companies laws. In addition, it mocks the conceits of the late 19th-century British Empire and several of the nation's beloved institutions. In mocking the adoption by a "barbaric" country of the cultural values of an "advanced" nation, it takes a tilt at the cultural aspects of imperialism. The libretto was criticised by some critics and later commentators as too long and rambling, and for leaving subplots introduced in Act I unresolved.

Utopia is performed much less frequently than most other Gilbert and Sullivan operas. It can be expensive to produce, requiring a large principal cast and two costumes ("native" and "drawing room") for most of the performers. The subject-matter and characters, including the specific government offices, are obscure for modern audiences, although its themes of corporatisation of public institutions and scandal in the British royal family remain relevant. Bernard Shaw wrote in his highly favourable October 1893 review of the show in The World, "I enjoyed the score of Utopia more than that of any of the previous Savoy operas."

Rutland Barrington as King Paramount

== Background ==
In 1890, during the production of Gilbert and Sullivan's previous opera, The Gondoliers, Gilbert became embroiled in a legal dispute with their producer, Richard D'Oyly Carte, over the cost of a new carpet for the Savoy Theatre – and, more generally, over the accounting for expenses over the course of their long partnership. Sullivan sided with Carte and was made a defendant in the case, and the partnership disbanded. Gilbert vowed to write no more operas for the Savoy, and after The Gondoliers closed in 1891, Gilbert withdrew the performance rights to his libretti. It was not until October 1891, after conversations with their publisher Tom Chappell, that Gilbert and Sullivan reconciled. After fulfilling their respective open commitments Gilbert and Sullivan were able to plan to renew their collaboration on a new opera, Utopia, Limited. The lawsuit, however, had left Gilbert and Sullivan somewhat embittered, and their last two works together suffered from a less collegial working relationship than the two men had typically enjoyed while writing earlier operas.

=== Genesis of the opera ===
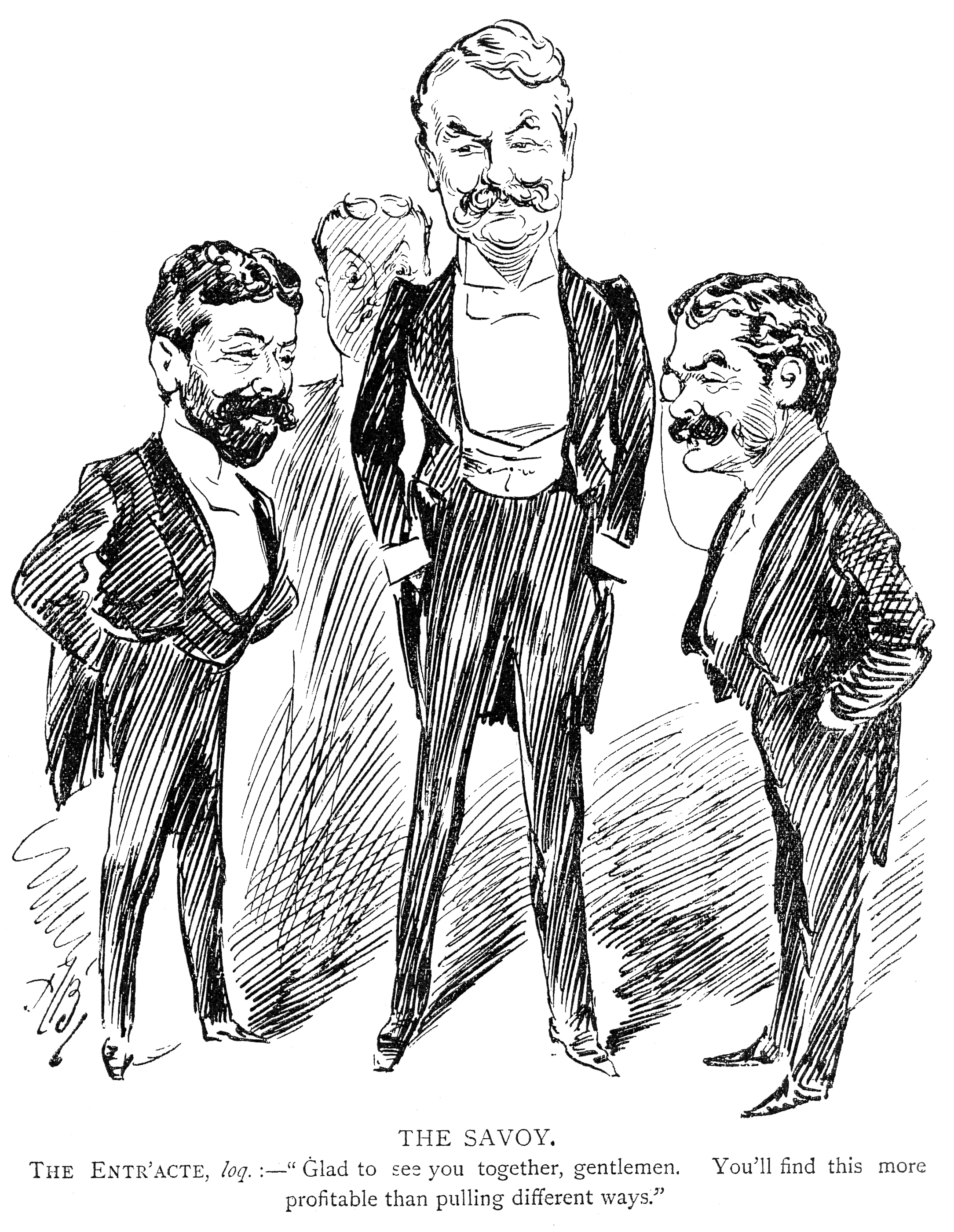
The Entr'acte expresses its pleasure that Gilbert and Sullivan are reunited.

In November 1892, after lengthy and delicate discussions over the financial arrangements for a new opera, Gilbert, Sullivan and Carte were able to reach an agreement and set to work on the new opera. On 27 January 1893, Gilbert read the plot outline for the libretto to Sullivan, and by July, he was finished with the libretto. Gilbert suffered from bad gout throughout the summer and autumn of 1893 and had to attend rehearsals in a wheelchair. Gilbert and Sullivan disagreed on several matters, including the character of Lady Sophy, and Sullivan found some of Gilbert's lyrics difficult to set. Their lack of cohesion during the writing and editing of Utopia was in marked contrast with what Sullivan called the "oneness" of their previous collaborations since Trial by Jury in 1875. Nonetheless, Sullivan completed the setting of Gilbert's first act within a month, and received particular congratulations from his collaborator for the finale, which Gilbert considered the best Sullivan had composed. For Utopia, the creators engaged Hawes Craven to design the sets, which were much praised. Craven was the designer for Henry Irving's spectacular Shakespeare productions at the Lyceum Theatre. Percy Anderson designed the costumes. The scenery, properties and costumes cost an unprecedented total of £7,200.

In 1893, the year Utopia, Limited was produced, Princess Kaiulani of the independent monarchy of Hawaii attended a private school in England. She was the talk of the society pages, with much speculation as to the influence English "civilization" would have on the Princess and eventually her homeland. Two decades earlier, in 1870, Anna Leonowens first wrote about her six-year stint as governess to the children of the king of Siam (Thailand) in The English Governess at the Siamese Court. The two ladies and their stories are likely to have influenced the characters of Princess Zara and Lady Sophy, respectively. Another impetus for Gilbert in the genesis of the work was his disdain for England's Limited Liability Act of 1862, which he had begun to explore in the previous opera with Sullivan, The Gondoliers.

By using an imaginary setting, Gilbert was emboldened to level some sharp satire at the British Empire, jingoism, the monarchy, party politics and other institutions that might have touched a more sensitive nerve if the opera had a British setting. In this work, Gilbert returns to the idea of an anti-Utopia, which he had explored, in various ways, in his early one-act operas, Happy Arcadia, Our Island Home, Topsyturveydom, and some of his other early works, especially The Happy Land. The previous Gilbert and Sullivan opera, The Gondoliers, also concerns an imaginary island kingdom where the rules of court are considerably different from those in Britain. In Utopia, the island begins as a virtual paradise, is thrown into chaos by the importation of "English" influences, and is eventually saved by an English political expedience. Gilbert's biographer Jane Stedman calls this a "Gilbertian invasion plot".

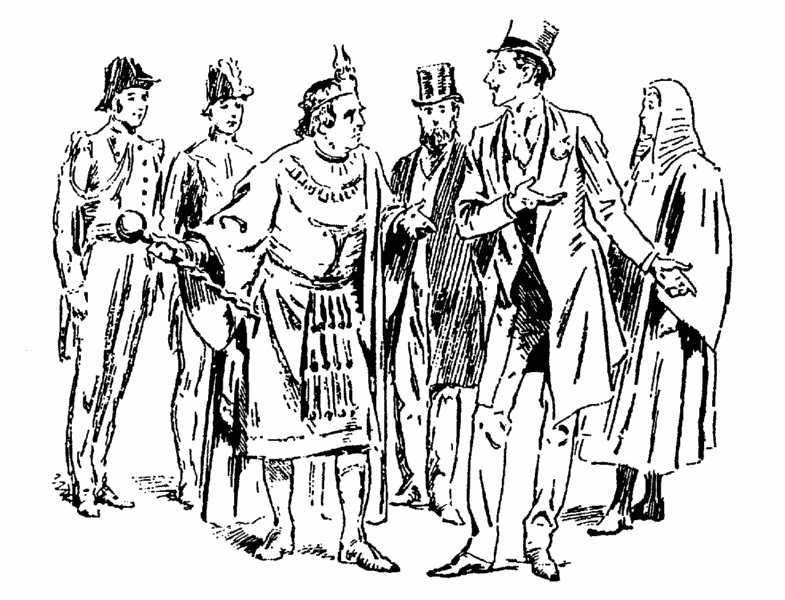
Mr Goldbury: "Some seven men form an association"

The opera's satiric treatment of limited liability entities that are not required to honour their obligations and scandal in the monarchy was effective in 1893 and still resonates today. In addition, the show satirises "practically everything English – English prudery, English conversation, English company promoting, the English party system, the English War Office and Admiralty, the County Council, and the English Cabinet." Apart from satirical elements, Gilbert indulges in some small topical touches throughout the libretto. For instance, he was up-to-date in his technological references (as he had been in H.M.S. Pinafore with the mention of the telephone), referencing George Eastman's new product, the Kodak camera, and its slogan, "You Press the Button, We Do the Rest". Gilbert also throws some barbs at the Lord Chamberlain's office, as he loved to do. In addition, The Court of St. James's is mockingly confused with St James's Hall and its minstrel shows. Sullivan joins in the parody, underlining the mock praise of all things English with a repeated motif throughout the score based on the melody of "Rule Britannia!".

=== Reception and aftermath ===
The Savoy audiences were glad to see Gilbert and Sullivan back together, and the first-night reception was rapturous. Sullivan wrote in his diary, "Went into the orchestra at 8.15 sharp. My ovation lasted 65 seconds! Piece went wonderfully well – not a hitch of any kind, and afterwards G. and I had a double call." The critics were divided on the merits of the piece. Punch, habitually hostile to Gilbert, commented, "'Limited' it is, in more senses than one." The Standard, by contrast, said, "Mr. Gilbert and Sir Arthur Sullivan are here at their very best … The wit, humour and satire of the book have not been surpassed in any of the author's previous operas, the composer's fascinating vein of melody flows as freshly as ever, and the orchestration is full of characteristically happy fancies … A more complete success has never been achieved in comic opera, even at the Savoy." The Pall Mall Gazette also praised Sullivan's contribution, but disparaged Gilbert's: in its view the music "has not its equal in the whole Sullivan and Gilbert series", but the book had "not merely a sense of cheapness but the sense of weariness even to exhaustion." The Era commented that Gilbert's "wit was as sparkling and his satire as keen as ever," and thought the council scene "screamingly funny". The Observer judged that Gilbert had lost none of his merits, and that "wit abounds" and "is as spontaneous as ever: not forced or vulgarised, and his rhymes are always faultless."

Some critics thought it a weakness that the work contained references to the earlier Gilbert and Sullivan operas, for example in the re-use of the character Captain Corcoran, and communications between King Paramount and the Mikado of Japan. The Pall Mall Gazette observed, "It is always a melancholy business when a writer is driven to imitate himself. Utopia (limited) is a mirthless travesty of the work with which his name is most generally associated. ... Mr. Gilbert has failed to make the old seem new". The Musical Times reported the theatregoing public's rejoicing that the partners were reunited, but added:

[A]ll would have indulged in renewed jubilations had Utopia (Limited) proved equal in humour and general freshness to the most successful of the companion works. This, unfortunately, cannot be said, although, of course, as compared with ordinary productions of the opéra bouffe class it stands out sufficiently clear. Mr. Gilbert could not put forward a silly or inane book, and Sir Arthur Sullivan could not pen music otherwise than refined, tuneful, and characterised by musicianly touches. It is only in comparison with such masterpieces of humour and dramatic and musical satire as Patience, The Mikado, The Yeomen of the Guard, and The Gondoliers that the libretto of Utopia (Limited) seems a trifle dull, particularly in the first Act, and the music for the most part reminiscent rather than fresh.

The Daily News and The Globe both noted that Act I ran longer than any previous Savoy Opera and needed pruning. The Manchester Guardian praised the work, but commented that there was "much (sometimes too much) Gilbertian dialogue". However, Gilbert and Sullivan's choices for what to cut are suspect. The soprano's aria, "Youth is a boon avowed" got some of the most enthusiastic reviews from the press but was cut after the opening night. The Globe called it "one of Sir Arthur Sullivan's best works". Also, the pre-production cuts left subplots that were introduced in Act I unresolved. For example, Sullivan refused to set one of Gilbert's scenes for Nancy McIntosh, which left the Scaphio–Phantis–Zara subplot unresolved. Rutland Barrington, in his memoirs, felt that the "second act... was not as full of fun as usual" in the Gilbert and Sullivan operas.

The show made a modest profit, despite the unusually high cost of staging it. In competition with the musical comedies' fashion pageantry, the drawing room scene was of an unprecedented opulence. The Manchester Guardian called it "one of the most magnificent ever beheld on the stage", and even Punch praised the splendour of the production, but it added thousands of pounds of expense, making Utopia the most expensive of all of the Savoy Operas. The taste of the London theatre-going public was shifting away from comic opera and towards musical comedies such as In Town (1892), A Gaiety Girl (1893) and Morocco Bound (1893), which were to dominate the London stage for the next two decades and beyond.

Nancy McIntosh and Charles Kenningham

Utopia introduced Gilbert's last protégée, Nancy McIntosh, as Princess Zara, and the role was much expanded to accommodate her. According to the scholar John Wolfson, in his book, Final Curtain, this damaged and unbalanced the script by detracting from its parody of government. Commentators agree that McIntosh was not a good actress, and during the run of Utopia, her lack of confidence and health combined to affect her performance. Utopia, Limited was to be McIntosh's only part with the D'Oyly Carte Opera Company, as Sullivan refused to write another piece if she was to take part in it. Discussions over her playing the role of Yum-Yum in a proposed revival of The Mikado led to another row between the two that prevented the revival, and Gilbert's insistence upon her appearing in His Excellency caused Sullivan to refuse to set the piece. Three years passed before Gilbert and Sullivan collaborated again, on their last work, The Grand Duke.

=== Production history ===
Before the end of October, the title of the piece was changed from Utopia (Limited) to Utopia, Limited. Utopia, Limited ran for 245 performances, a modest success by the standards of the late Victorian theatre; although it was a shorter run than any of Gilbert and Sullivan's 1880s collaborations, it was the longest run at the Savoy in the 1890s. After the original production, four D'Oyly Carte touring companies played Utopia in the British provinces, and the piece was included in tours until 1900. There were also a D'Oyly Carte production in New York in 1894, performances in the D'Oyly Carte South African tour of 1902–03, and a J. C. Williamson production in Australia and New Zealand in 1905 and 1906, managed by Henry Bracy. Rupert D'Oyly Carte considered producing a revival in 1925, but the cost of the production was found to be too great, and the proposed revival was abandoned. Utopia was not revived by the D'Oyly Carte Opera Company until 4 April 1975, during the company's centenary season at the Savoy Theatre, directed by Michael Heyland. The single performance was so oversubscribed that the company arranged to give four further performances at the Royal Festival Hall in London later that year.

Various amateur companies performed the opera during the 20th century, and it has enjoyed occasional professional productions in the U.S. by professional companies such as the American Savoyards in the 1950s and 1960s, the Light Opera of Manhattan in the 1970s and 1980s, Light Opera Works in Chicago in 1984 and Ohio Light Opera in 2001. The New York Gilbert and Sullivan Players also gave a staged concert performance in celebration of the opera's centenary in 1993 and again in 2010. Its first full production of the opera was in 2026. The Gilbert & Sullivan Opera Company gave two fully staged performances at the 18th International Gilbert and Sullivan Festival in Buxton, England in 2011, producing a commercial video of the production. Scottish Opera toured the piece in 2021 and 2022. Although productions are still less frequent than those of the better-known Gilbert and Sullivan operas, and professional productions are rare, Utopia is regularly presented by some of the amateur Gilbert and Sullivan repertory companies, and an amateur production has been seen most summers at the International Gilbert and Sullivan Festival.

== Roles ==
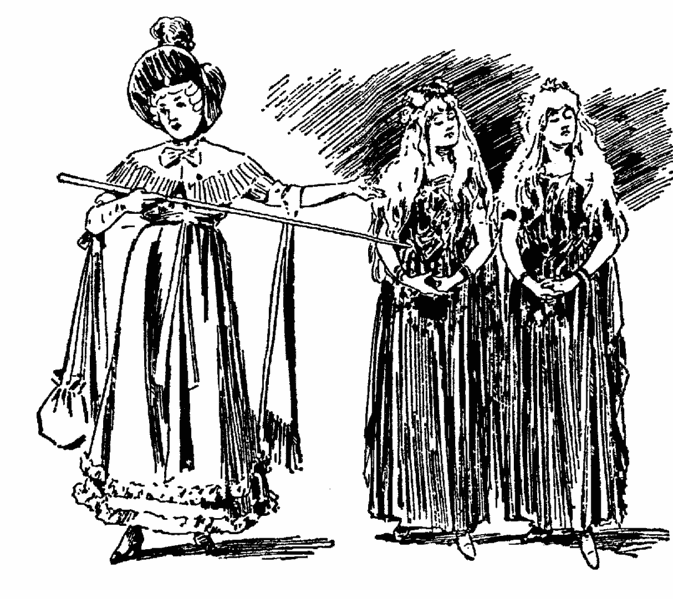
Lady Sophy presents Princesses Nekaya and Kalyba

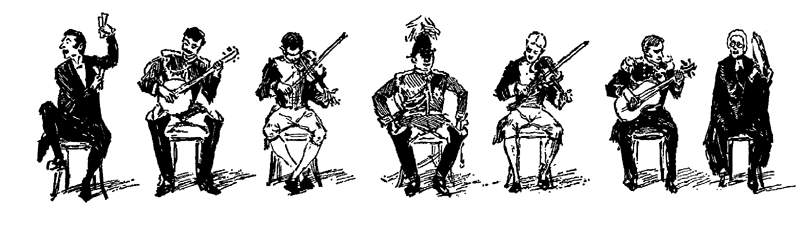
King Paramount and The Flowers of Progress in "Society has quite forsaken all her wicked courses"

Utopians

- King Paramount the First, King of Utopia (baritone)
- Phantis, Scaphio, Judges of the Utopian Supreme Court (comic baritones)
- Tarara, The Public Exploder (comic baritone)
- Calynx, The Utopian Vice-Chamberlain (speaking)
- The Princess Zara, eldest daughter of King Paramount (soprano)
- The Princess Nekaya (soprano) and The Princess Kalyba (mezzo-soprano), her younger sisters
- The Lady Sophy, their English Gouvernante (contralto)
- Salata (speaking), Melene (speaking), and Phylla (soprano), Utopian Maidens

Imported Flowers of Progress

- Lord Dramaleigh, a British Lord Chamberlain (high baritone)
- Captain Fitzbattleaxe, First Life Guards (tenor)
- Captain Sir Edward Corcoran, KCB, of the Royal Navy (bass)
- Mr. Goldbury, a Company Promoter, afterwards Comptroller of the Utopian Household (baritone)
- Sir Bailey Barre, QC, MP (tenor)
- Mr. Blushington, of the County Council (baritone)

== Synopsis ==
=== Act I ===
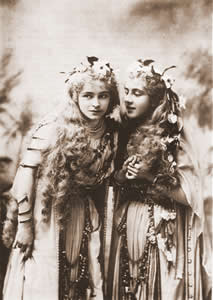
Owen and Perry as Nekaya and Kalyba

On the fictional South Pacific island of Utopia, the monarch, King Paramount, has sent his eldest daughter, Princess Zara, to Girton College in England. He hopes that her training there will contribute to his plan to civilise his people. The Public Exploder, Tarara, disturbs the languor of the Utopian maidens ("In lazy languor, motionless") to remind them of his duty to blow up the King with dynamite if the two "Wise Men", Scaphio and Phantis, order him to do so; Tarara would then be appointed King. The Wise Men appear, heralded by the chorus ("O make way for the Wise Men") and note that their duty is to spy upon the King to prevent "rascality" ("In every mental lore"). Phantis proclaims his love for the Princess Zara, and Scaphio promises to help him win her ("Let all your doubts take wing").

The king arrives ("A King of autocratic power we") and presents his two younger daughters, Nekaya and Kalyba, as models of English-style deportment ("Although of native maids the cream"). Their English governess, Lady Sophy, explains how young ladies should behave when approached by amorous gentlemen ("Bold-faced ranger"). The king joins the two Wise Men, commenting that life is a farce ("First you're born"). The king is quite upset about the Wise Men's power over him: he is unable to marry the Lady Sophy because of self-mocking articles that Scaphio and Phantis have forced him to write and publish in the newspaper under a pseudonym. He hopes that neither Sophy nor Zara will see the pieces, although he feels they are witty and well written. Lady Sophy discovers the articles to her horror ("Subjected to your heavenly gaze").

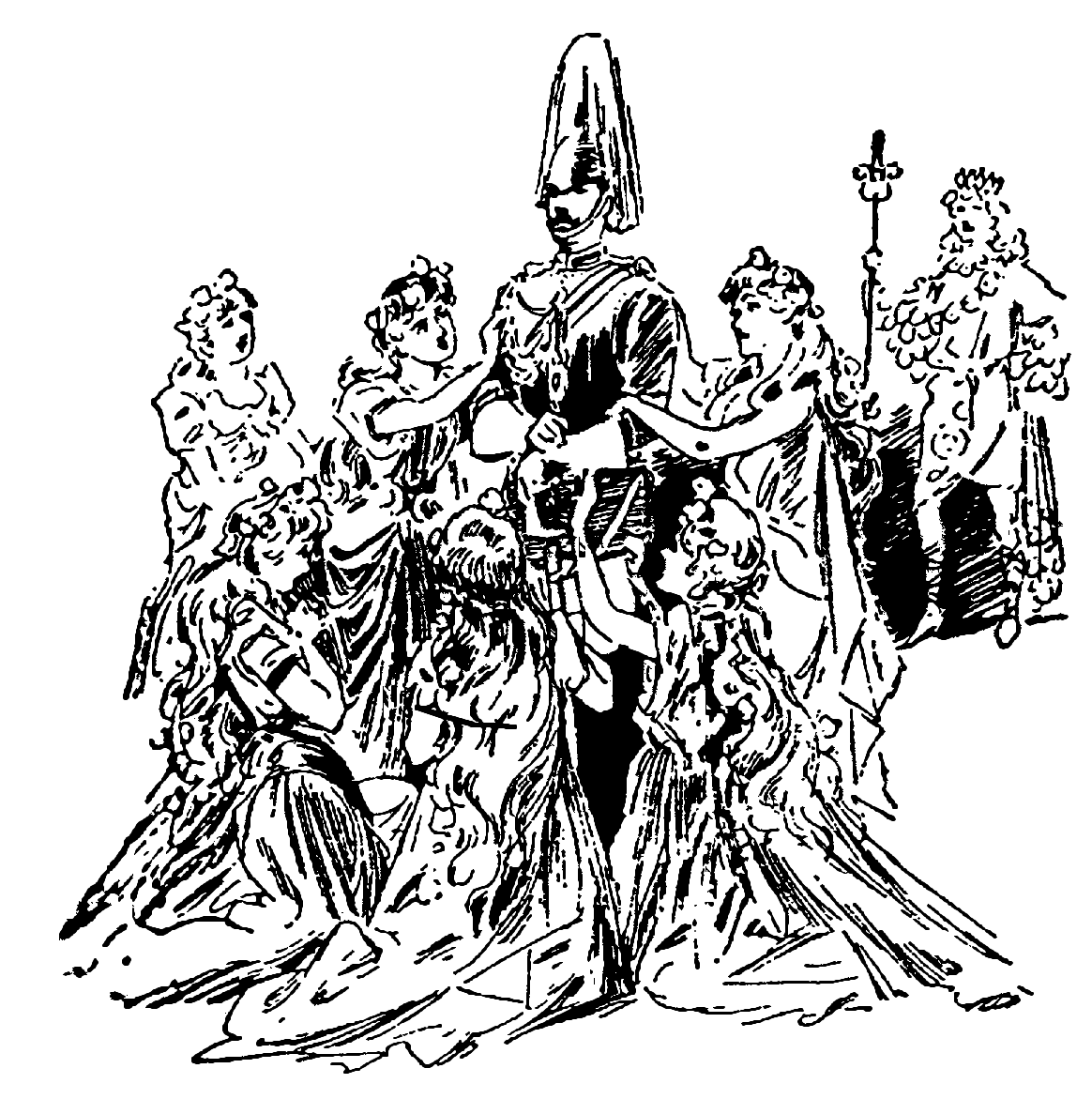
A member of the Life Guards is admired by Utopian maidens

Princess Zara now returns to Utopia with six British gentlemen (the "Flowers of Progress") in tow ("Oh, maiden rich in Girton lore"). She has become romantically involved with one of them, Captain Fitzbattleaxe ("Ah! gallant soldier"). Scaphio and Phantis, seeing her, are both smitten with love for the princess and argue jealously, finally agreeing to duel one another for her hand. Fitzbattleaxe comes up with a clever way to stall the Wise Men, by saying that, in England, two rivals must entrust the lady at the centre of a controversy to an officer of household cavalry "as stakeholder" until the argument is resolved ("It's understood, I think"). Thus, he and Zara can remain together.

Soon, the Utopians assemble, and Zara introduces the Flowers of Progress one by one – Fitzbattleaxe (of the army), Sir Bailey Barre (Q.C. and MP), Lord Dramaleigh (a Lord Chamberlain), Mr. Blushington (of the county council), Mr. Goldbury (a company promoter) and Captain Corcoran (of the navy – a joking reference to the character from Gilbert and Sullivan's early popular opera, H.M.S. Pinafore). The Utopian people are duly impressed, and they listen as each of the Flowers of Progress gives a piece of advice about how to improve the country. Mr. Goldbury explains, at some length, the British limited liability companies law ("Some seven men form an association"). The King decides to transform his entire country into a limited liability corporation – an innovation that even England herself has not yet accepted. Everyone but Scaphio, Phantis and Tarara is enthusiastic.

=== Act II ===
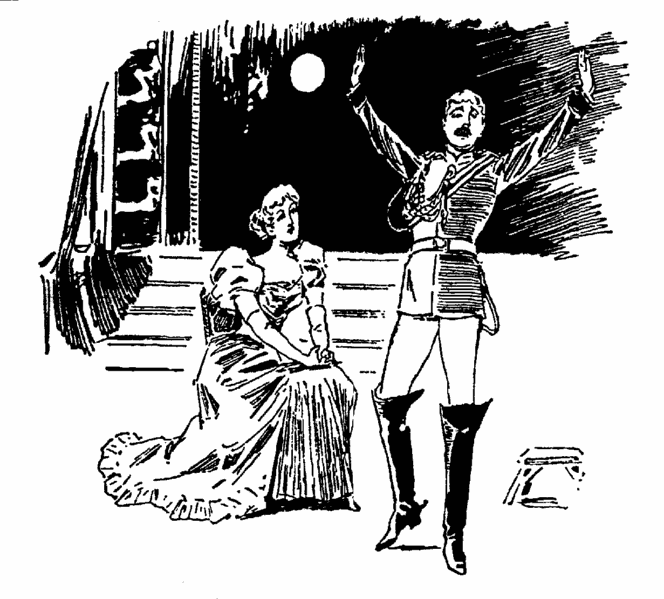
Fitzbattleaxe: "A tenor can't do himself justice" when overcome with love

Fitzbattleaxe is concerned that the fervour of his love has affected his singing voice ("A tenor, all singers above"). He and Zara share a tender scene ("Words of love too loudly spoken"). Utopia has transformed itself into a "more perfect" replica of Britain – it has built an army, a navy, and courts, purified its literature and drama, and wholeheartedly adopted Mr. Goldbury's proposal, so that every person now is a limited liability entity.

The king and the Flowers of Progress exult in their success ("Society has quite forsaken"), and the people, pleased with English fashions and customs, sing of the country's newfound glory ("Eagle high in cloudland soaring"). Scaphio and Phantis are furious because the change poses a threat to their power ("With fury deep we burn"). They demand that Paramount revoke the changes, and when he refuses, they remind him of their power over his life ("If you think that when banded in unity"). But the King points out that they cannot blow up a limited company. Scaphio and Phantis plot with Tarara on how to reverse the course of events and retire ("With wily brain").

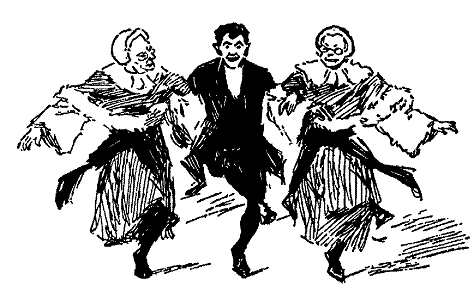
Scaphio, Phantis, and Tarara hatch a private plot

The younger princesses, Nekaya and Kalyba, meet Mr. Goldbury and Lord Dramaleigh, who explain that English girls are not so demure and are instead hearty and fun-loving ("A wonderful joy our eyes to bless"). The princesses are pleased at the prospect of abandoning some of the "musty, fusty rules" that they have been living under ("Then I may sing and play?"). Meanwhile, Lady Sophy bemoans Paramount's flaw that prevents her loving him ("When but a maid of fifteen year"). The King, his dignity rediscovered, approaches Lady Sophy and tells her the truth about the articles written about him, and she now happily agrees to marry him ("Oh, rapture unrestrained").

Scaphio and Phantis, however, have succeeded in convincing the people of Utopia that the changes are for the worse ("Upon our sea-girt land"). For example, there has been an end to war, making the army and navy useless; sanitation is so good that the doctors are unemployed; and so perfect are the laws that crime has all but ended, emptying the courts and leaving lawyers jobless. The people demand that the changes be revoked. Paramount asks his daughter for a solution, and, after a little prodding from Sir Bailey Barre, she realizes that she has forgotten "the most essential element" of British civilisation: Government by Party! Under the two-party system, each party will so confound the efforts of the other that no progress will be made, leading to the happy result that everyone seeks. The crowd is overjoyed, Scaphio and Phantis are thrown in prison, and the curtain falls as the people sing their praises of "a little group of isles beyond the wave" – Great Britain.

== Musical numbers ==
A tenor all singers above
Scott Russell as Captain Fitzbattleaxe, 1900

- Introduction^{1}

Act I

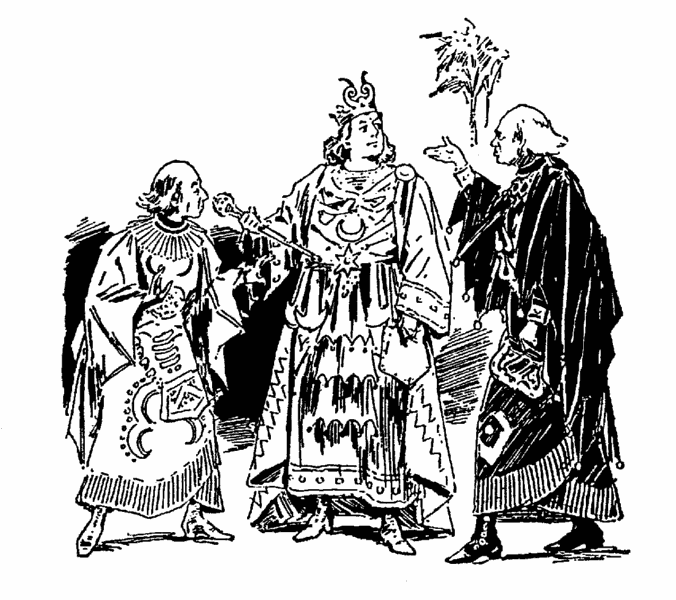
King Paramount confers with Scaphio and Phantis

- 1. "In lazy languor motionless" (Phylla and Chorus of Girls)
- 2. "O make way for the Wise Men" (Chorus)
- 2a. "In every mental lore" (Scaphio and Phantis)
- 3. "Let all your doubts take wing" (Scaphio and Phantis)
- 4. "Quaff the nectar" (Chorus)
- 4a. "A King of autocratic power we" (King with Chorus)
- 4b. "Although of native maids the cream" (Nekaya and Kalyba)
- 4c. "Bold-faced ranger" (Lady Sophy with Chorus)
- 5. "First you're born" (King with Scaphio and Phantis)
- 6. "Subjected to your heavenly gaze" (King and Lady Sophy)
- 7. "Oh, maiden rich in Girton lore" (Zara, Fitz., Troopers, and Chorus)
- 8. "Ah! gallant soldier" (Zara, Fitz., Troopers, and Chorus)
- 9. "It's understood, I think" (Zara, Fitz., Scaphio, and Phantis)
- 10. "Oh, admirable art" (Zara and Fitz.)
- (11. Cut song for Zara, "Youth is a boon avowed", sung on the first night but now lost.)
- 12. Act I Finale: "Although your Royal summons to appear" (Ensemble) and "When Britain sounds the trump of war" (Zara, Sir Bailey Barre, and Chorus)
- 12a. "What these may be" (Zara, Dramaleigh, Blushington, and Chorus) and "A company promoter this" (Zara, Goldbury, and Chorus)
- 12b. "I'm Captain Corcoran, K.C.B." (Capt. Corcoran with Chorus) and "Ye wand'rers from a mighty State" (Quartet, Chorus, and Soli)
- 12c. "Some seven men form an association" (Mr. Goldbury with Chorus), "Well, at first sight it strikes us as dishonest" (Ensemble), and "Henceforward of a verity" (King Paramount and Ensemble)

Act II

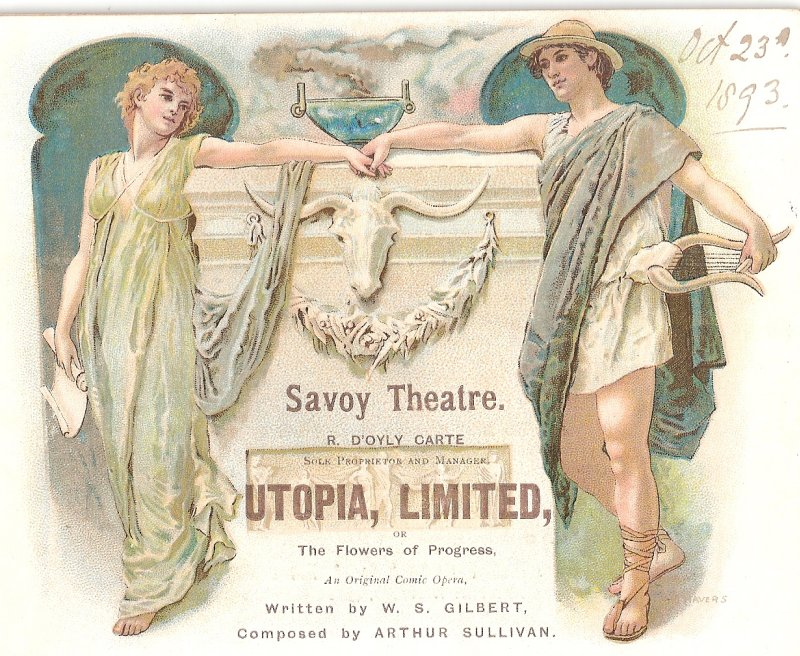
Souvenir programme for Utopia, Limited

- 13. "Oh, Zara!" and "A tenor, all singers above" (Fitz.)
- 14. "Words of love too loudly spoken" (Zara and Fitz.)
- 15. "Society has quite forsaken" (King with Chorus of Six Flowers of Progress)
- 16. Entrance of Court
- 17. Drawing Room Music
- 18. "This ceremonial", "Eagle high in cloudland soaring" (King and Ensemble)
- 19. "With fury deep we burn" (Scaphio, Phantis, and King Paramount)
- 20. "If you think that when banded in unity" (King, Scaphio and Phantis)
- 21. "With wily brain" (Scaphio, Phantis, and Tarara)
- 22. "A wonderful joy our eyes to bless" (Mr. Goldbury)
- 23. "Then I may sing and play?" (Nek., Kal., Lord D., and Mr. Goldbury)
- 24. "Oh, would some demon pow'r", "When but a maid of fifteen year" (Lady Sophy)
- 25. "Ah, Lady Sophy, then you love me!" (King and Lady Sophy)
- 25a. "Oh, rapture unrestrained" (King and Lady Sophy)
- 25b. Tarantella
- 26. "Upon our sea-girt land" (Chorus)
- 27. Finale Act II: "There's a little group of isles beyond the wave" (Zara, King Paramount, and Ensemble)

^{1} On the 1976 recording, the D'Oyly Carte Opera Company preceded the Introduction with Sullivan's Imperial March, which he composed around the same time.

== Historical cast information ==
Soon after Sir Luke Fildes had been rewarded by a grateful country for his services to Art, Gilbert met him at a social gathering and congratulated him on his new honours. In the course of conversation, Sir Luke reminded Gilbert that the Dairy Maid "Patience" had been made up to exactly resemble the subject of his first successful picture, Where are you going to, my pretty maid? "Yes, I remember borrowing the idea for my milkmaid's costume from your picture," replied Gilbert, "but I have repaid that debt long ago by being the responsible cause of your new title."
"Responsible for my new title, how do you make that out?" asked the puzzled Sir Luke.
"Oh, it's easily explained," answered Gilbert. Didn't I write in Utopia:

"Who knows but we may count among our intellectual chickens
Like you, an Earl of Thackeray, and p'r'aps a Duke of Dickens—
Lord Fildes and Viscount Millais (when they come) we'll welcome sweetly—
In short this happy country has been Anglicised completely!"

"Well, your prophecy is certainly a pattern of modified accuracy," exclaimed Sir Luke, "I would like to be similarly accurate in your case."
– From Edith A. Browne's Stars of the Stage: W. S. Gilbert (1907), p. 93

The opening night principal cast and 1975 centenary cast were as follows:

Role	1893	1975
King Paramount the First	Rutland Barrington	Kenneth Sandford
Scaphio	W. H. Denny	John Reed
Phantis	John Le Hay	John Ayldon
Tarara	Walter Passmore	Jon Ellison
Calynx	Bowden Haswell	Michael Buchan
The Princess Zara	Nancy McIntosh	Pamela Field
The Princess Nekaya	Emmie Owen	Julia Goss
The Princess Kalyba	Florence Perry	Judi Merri
The Lady Sophy	Rosina Brandram	Lyndsie Holland
Salata	Edith Johnston	Beti Lloyd-Jones
Melene	May Bell	Marjorie Williams
Phylla	Florence Easton	Rosalind Griffiths
Lord Dramaleigh	Scott Russell	James Conroy-Ward
Captain Fitzbattleaxe	Charles Kenningham	Meston Reid
Captain Sir Edward Corcoran, KCB	Lawrence Gridley	John Broad
Mr. Goldbury	R. Scott Fishe	Michael Rayner
Sir Bailey Barre	Hugh Enes Blackmore	Colin Wright
Mr. Blushington	Herbert Ralland	David Porter

== Recordings ==
The first recording was issued in 1964 featuring the amateur Lyric Theatre Company of Washington, D.C. conducted by John Landis. The first complete professional recording was released in 1976 by the D'Oyly Carte Opera Company, conducted by Royston Nash, variously considered "a somewhat flat and uninspired account of the score" or to have "a sparkle and spontaneity" that are "irresistible". The critic Andrew Lamb wrote, "There is a suggestion of stodginess in the conducting … but the singing displays the dependability that is the D'Oyly Carte company's chief virtue. Kenneth Sandford is outstanding as King Paramount." Also available is a 2001 Ohio Light Opera (OLO) set, of which Opera News wrote: "Conducted with verve by J. Lynn Thompson and featuring a generally strong cast, it serves the musical values of Utopia well. ... The principals sing with fine style and admirable diction." Unlike the other recordings, OLO includes the dialogue, though Opera News considered that some performers "lack dramatic variety in the spoken dialogue".

Katherine Cooper, writing for Presto Music, called the 2025 recording by Scottish Opera (which does not contain the dialogue) "a sparkling new account" of the opera, adding, "Clark’s zippy, flexible direction and a uniformly strong cast of British singers ... often surpass their counterpart on [the D'Oyly Carte] recording. Diction from all is crystal-clear but refreshingly unmannered". She describes the singing of the romantic leads as "radiant" and that of the others as variously "an endearing delight", "glowing" and "a joy".
