= Evil May Day =

1517 riot by London apprentices hostile towards Flemish merchants in the city

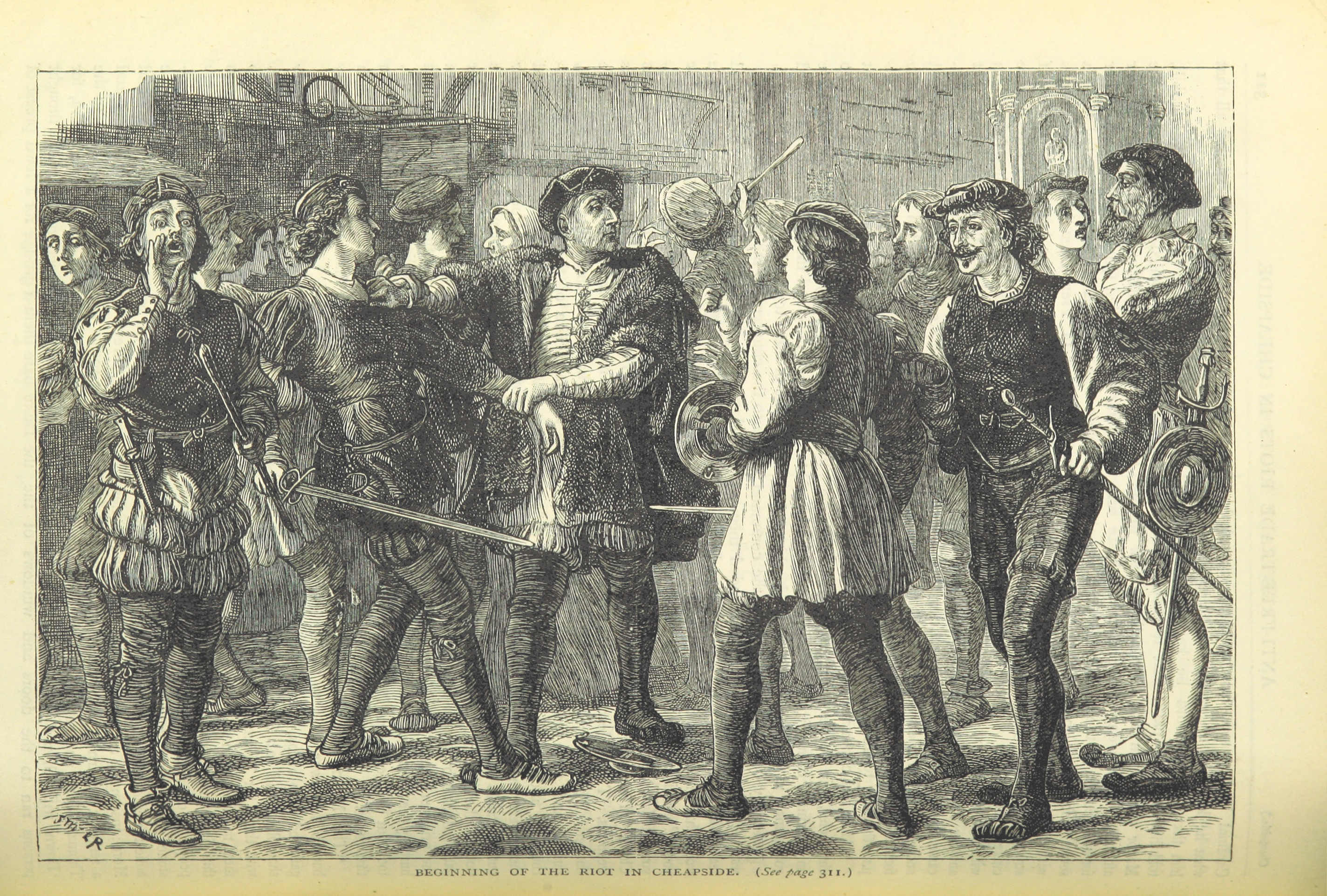
Beginning of the Riot in Cheapside

Evil May Day or Ill May Day is the name of a xenophobic riot which took place on 1 May 1517 as a protest against foreigners (called "strangers") living in London. Apprentices attacked foreign residents ranging from "Flemish cobblers" to "French royal courtiers". Some of the rioters were later hanged, although King Henry VIII granted a pardon for the remainder following public pleadings from his wife Catherine of Aragon.

== Causes ==
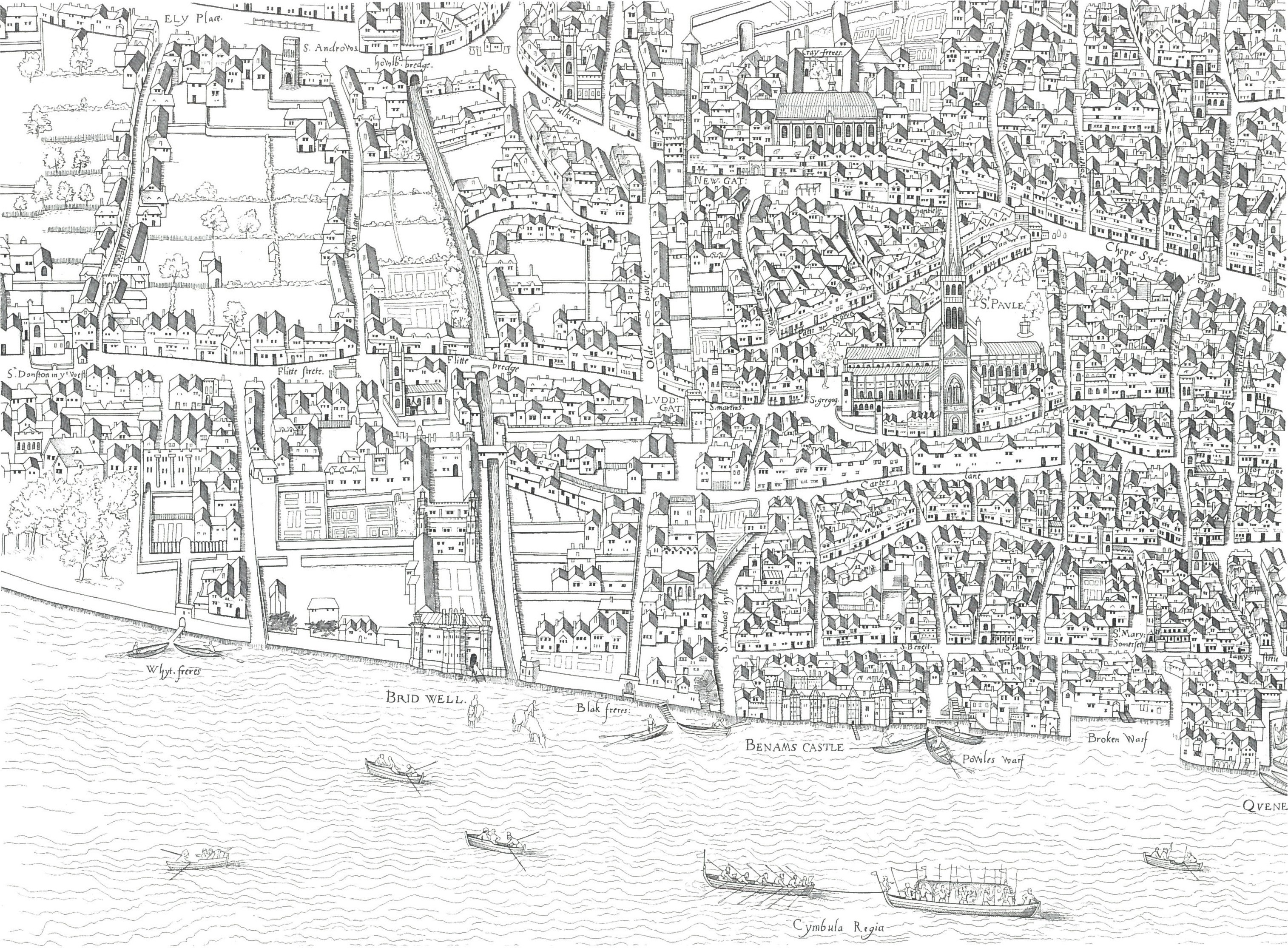
Map of west London from the 1550s

=== Demographics of Tudor London ===
In the early part of the reign of King Henry VIII, Londoners came to resent the presence of foreigners (called "strangers") arriving from the continent, especially immigrant Flemish workers and the wealthy foreign merchants and bankers of Lombard Street. At the time, only about 2% of London's population of approximately 50,000 were foreign-born.

=== Role of "Dr Bell" ===
According to the chronicler Edward Hall (c. 1498–1547), a fortnight before the riot an inflammatory xenophobic speech was made on Easter Tuesday by a preacher known as "Dr Bell" at St. Paul's Cross at the instigation of John Lincoln, a broker. Bell accused immigrants of stealing jobs from English workers and of "eat[ing] the bread from poor fatherless children".

Bell called on all "Englishmen to cherish and defend themselves, and to hurt and grieve aliens for the common weal". Over the following two weeks, there were sporadic attacks on foreigners and rumours abounded that "on May Day next the city would rebel and slay all aliens".

=== Government preparations ===
The mayor and aldermen, afraid of any possible disturbances, announced at 8:30 pm on the 30 April 1517 that there would be a 9:00 pm curfew that night. John Mundy, a local alderman, travelling through Cheapside on his way home that night, saw a group of young men after the curfew. Mundy ordered the men to remove themselves from the streets to which one replied: "Why?" Mundy replied: "Thou shalt know" and grabbed his arm to arrest him. The man's friends defended him and Mundy fled "in great danger".

== Riot ==
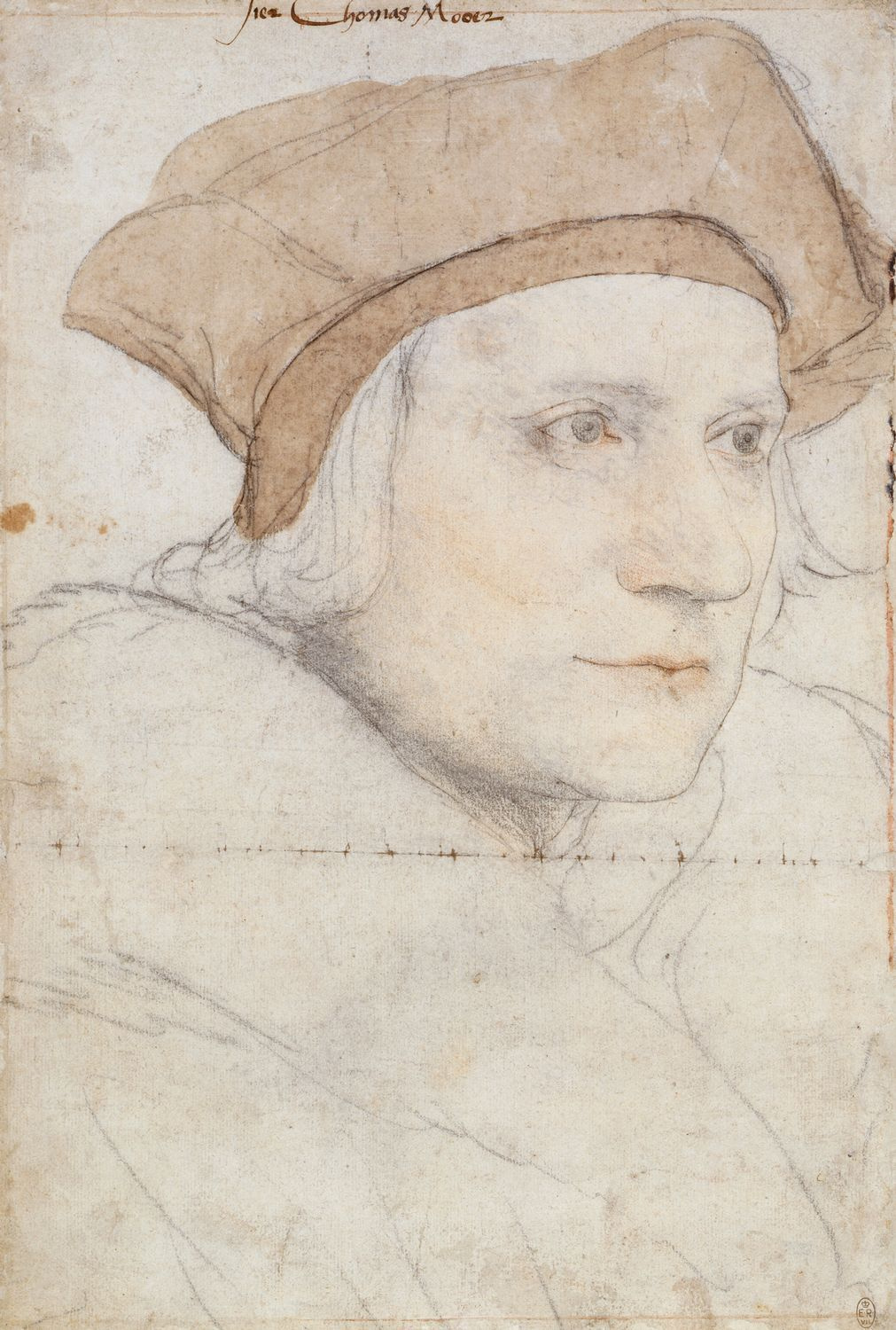
Thomas More (drawing by Hans Holbein the Younger, c. 1526), then the under-sheriff of London, was among the city officials who tried to stop the riot to no avail

Within a few hours, approximately a thousand young male apprentices had congregated in Cheapside. The mob freed several prisoners who were locked up for attacking foreigners and proceeded to St Martin le Grand, a liberty north of (Old) St Paul's Cathedral where numerous foreigners lived. Here they were met by the under-sheriff of London, Thomas More, who attempted to persuade them to return to their homes. As soon as More had calmed them, however, the inhabitants of St Martin started to throw stones, brickbats, and boiling water from their windows, some of which fell on an official who screamed: "Down with them!"

This sparked panic in the mob and they looted foreigners' houses there and elsewhere in the city. The Duke of Norfolk entered the city with his private army of 1,300 retainers to suppress the riots. By 3 a.m. the riot had died down, and 300 people under arrest were released. However, 13 of the rioters were convicted of treason and executed on 4 May 1517 and John Lincoln was executed three days later. This account by Hall is mirrored by a letter to the Venetian doge written five days after the riot. While the mob were on the rampage, Sir Richard Cholmeley, the Lieutenant of the Tower of London, furiously ordered the firing of some of the Tower's artillery at the city, drawing the ire of the city elders.

In other versions, the rioters closed the city gates to prevent the King's guard from being reinforced and then temporarily took control over the city. King Henry was woken up in the middle of the night at his residence in Richmond and was told of the mayhem ensuing in the capital. Then forces under the command of the Duke of Norfolk (or the Earl of Shrewsbury and Duke of Suffolk) and his son the Earl of Surrey finally arrived in the city and seized prisoners. According to Hall's account, only eleven of the 400 or so rioters were women.

== Aftermath ==
By 5 May 1517, there were over 5,000 troops in London. When the prisoners had an audience with King Henry in Westminster Hall, the nobility then got on its knees to plead for a pardon for the prisoners. Henry announced the pardon after his wife, Catherine of Aragon, appealed before him to spare the lives of the rebels for the sake of their wives and children. At this the prisoners "took the halters from their necks and danced and sang".

Historian Brodie Waddell summarised the riots by saying that, despite the fact that "Flemish cobblers had little in common with French royal courtiers", both wealthy and working-class immigrants "suffered at the hands of the crowd."

The event features in the Elizabethan play Sir Thomas More partially attributed to William Shakespeare.

== Notes ==
Citations

References

- Carolly Erickson, Great Harry: The Extravagant Life of Henry VIII (Robson Books, 2004); ISBN 1-86105-638-9.
- Fergus Linnane, The Encyclopedia of London Crime (Sutton Publishing, 2005); ISBN 0-7509-3303-8.
- Steve Rappaport, Worlds Within Worlds: Structures of Life in Sixteenth-Century London (Cambridge University Press, 2002); ISBN 0-521-89221-X
- Jasper Ridley, Henry VIII (Penguin Classics, 2002); ISBN 0-14-139124-3.
