= Go-Bang =

English musical comedy

1894 programme

Go-Bang is an English musical comedy with words by Adrian Ross and music by F. Osmond Carr.

The piece was produced by Fred Harris and opened at the Trafalgar Square Theatre on 10 March 1894. It ran for 159 performances. The show starred Harry Grattan, George Grossmith, Jr., Arthur Playfair, Jessie Bond, and dancer Letty Lind. The American child prodigy "Baby Costello" danced in the interval between acts. Whereas Ross generally acted as lyricist only, in this case he created the book as well as the lyrics.

== Synopsis ==
Dam Row, the Boojam-elect of the Asian country of Go-Bang, visits England to learn Western manners, escorted by Sir Reddan Tapeleigh. There, he finds that he is not Boojam after all. He falls in love with a dancer after seeing her performance, although he generally finds it difficult to grasp Western ways. He returns to Go-Bang as prime minister to the new chief, a humble greengrocer (previously Sir Reddan's footman), who is to be formally installed as Boojam at the palace in Go Bang. The parents of various girls scheme to marry their daughters to the Boojam. He must stand under the Golden Umbrella, where all decrees are announced, but finds himself married by mistake to three girls in as many minutes. Fortunately, the marriage decree is revoked. Sir Reddan's secretary loves Helen, Sir Reddan's daughter, and she helps him to find documents to prove that he is the rightful Boojam.

== Roles and original cast ==
- Jenkins (A greengrocer) – Harry Grattan
- Sir Reddan Tapeleigh, K.C.S.I. – Arthur Playfair
- Lieut. The Hon. Augustus Fitzpoop – George Grossmith, Jr.
- Wang (Guardian of the Golden Canopy) – Fred Storey
- Narain (Secretary to the Boojam – Edgar Stevens
- Dam Row (Boojam elect of Go-Bang) – John L. Shine
- Helen Tapeleigh (Daughter of Sir Reddan) – Jessie Bond
- Lady Fritterleigh (Widow of an Indian official) – Agnes Hewitt
- Sarah Anne (Housemaid to Sir Reddan) – Adelaide Astor
- Flo, Belle and Daisy Wedderburn (Sisters of Lady Fritterleigh) – Lydia Flopp, Maggie Roberts and Maud Lockett
- Di Dalrymple (Premiere danseuse of the Vanity Theatre) – Letty Lind
- Candidates, waiters, nobles and people of Go-Bang, soldiers, etc.

== Reception ==
A review of the piece spoofed the loose plot (though praising it) in the following verse:

There is certainly not very much of a plot
In the musical farce of Go-Bang,
But, as someone remarks in the course of the larks,
Here the plot "doesn't matter a hang!"
For the music is light, and the dresses are bright,
And the ladies are shapely and tall;
There is dancing and song, and the skirts aren't too long,
And there's frequently no skirt at all.

The Times found the plot laboured and the satire heavy-handed, but praised the songs, Letty Lind's dancing, Grattan's and Grossmith's portrayals and Bond's singing. The most popular song was Lind's song "Di, Di, Di", and Lind earned the highest praise from The Observer.
