= Michael Heyland =

British actor and director

Michael Heyland is a retired British actor and director. He was Director of Productions of the D'Oyly Carte Opera Company from 1969 to 1978. Later, he was an arts and events consultant for many organizations and managed the Royal Choral Society for sixteen years, among other projects. As an actor and voice actor, he has appeared on radio, TV and in films.

== Early life and career ==
Heyland was born in Calcutta, India, where his father was stationed in the Indian Army. He studied both music and drama at Guildhall School of Music & Drama, London. He began his career working in repertory, including A Christmas Carol at Theatre Royal, Stratford East and Brecht's Happy End at the Royal Court Theatre, London. He also played in pantomime.

He was engaged as Director of Productions of the D'Oyly Carte Opera Company from 1969 to 1978. He directed the company's television recording of H.M.S. Pinafore in 1973 and a new production of The Sorcerer (1971), which had not been produced professionally in Britain since 1940. He also directed a new production of Utopia, Limited (1975), which had not been revived by the company for over 70 years, at the Savoy Theatre for the company's centennial celebration. In 1977, he restaged Iolanthe, which later toured Australia and New Zealand. He also restaged the Act 2 finale of Ruddigore and the opening chorus of Patience.

Heyland directed the company's entire repertoire of the Gilbert and Sullivan operas and Cox and Box on tour throughout the UK, for the company's annual seasons in the West End and took productions to Copenhagen, Aarhus, Rome, and on tour in North America, including New York, Los Angeles and Toronto.

== Later years ==
On leaving the D'Oyly Carte company, he formed an events consultancy "Influence" directing Lambeth and Guildford Arts Festivals, National events Consultant to Cancer Research Campaign and Mental Health Foundation. For the Cancer Research Campaign he created "Get Sponsored to the Great Picnic, by Land, Water & Air" at Windsor Great Park which was attended by Queen Elizabeth II.

He managed the Royal Choral Society for sixteen years, promoting concerts at the Royal Albert and Festival Halls, and devised tours to France, Poland, Switzerland and Portugal. The Society also made many recordings with the London Symphony Orchestra and RPO in the successful Classic Rock and Hooked on Classics albums with regular broadcasts on Radio 2. With John Burrows, he devised the Capital Radio Christmas Festival at the Royal Albert Hall for seven years. With Tom Hunter he created LBC's London to Paris Treasure Hunts and Fox Fm's Oxford to Paris Treasure Hunt.

Later, he devised the Great London Bike Rides sponsored by a series of radio stations from LBC, JazzFm, KissFm & Heart Radio which ran for seventeen years. He also later acted as events consultant at Rougham Airfield near Bury St Edmunds, producing five open air shows a year and expanded his repertoire to commentaries and voice overs.
