= Frank Osmond Carr =

English composer

Carr in 1894

Frank Osmond Carr (23 April 1858 – 29 August 1916), known as F. Osmond Carr, was an English composer who wrote the music for several Victorian burlesques before turning to the new genre of Edwardian musical comedy, and also composing some comic operas. He often worked with the lyricist Adrian Ross, and several of his pieces were created for the producer George Edwardes.

== Life and career ==
Carr was born in Bradford, Yorkshire, England. His parents were George Saxton Carr, a schoolmaster and Margaret Durden Carr, née Painter. He attended New College, Oxford, and Downing College, Cambridge, receiving a B.A. degree in 1883 and apparently returning to Oxford to receive a music degree there in 1884. He continued his studies at Trinity College, Cambridge, earning a Cambridge M.A. and B.Mus. in 1886 and gained a doctorate in music at Oxford in 1891. An active Freemason, he was initiated into Isaac Newton University Lodge in 1887.

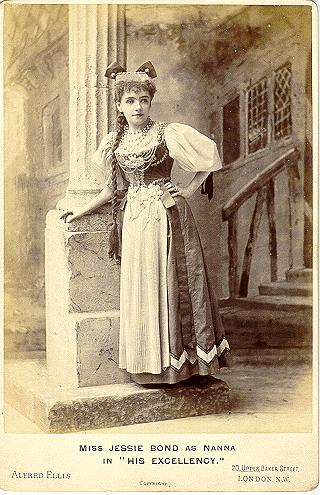
Jessie Bond in Carr's His Excellency

Carr's first produced work (with lyricist Adrian Ross) was the burlesque Faddimir, or the Triumph of Orthodoxy at the Vaudeville Theatre in London in 1889, which gained the attention of producer George Edwardes. Edwardes began to commission songs from Carr and Ross, including a song for his next Gaiety Theatre burlesque Ruy Blas and the Blasé Roué. They next wrote the score for a burlesque of Joan of Arc, or, The merry maid of Orleans (1891), and then the songs for what many historians consider the first British musical comedy, In Town (1892). Carr also composed another burlesque that year, Blue Eyed Susan, for the Prince of Wales Theatre. Carr next composed two successful musicals for producer Fred Harris: Morocco Bound (1893), a model for the music-hall-influenced "variety musicals" to come, and Go-Bang (1894), both with lyrics by Ross.

1n 1894, Edwardes engaged Carr to write the music for His Excellency, a comic opera with a libretto by W. S. Gilbert. This was a moderate success and enjoyed international productions. Carr's musicals in the late 1890s, included Billy (1895), My Girl (1896 with Ross), Biarritz (1896 with Ross and Jerome K Jerome), a vehicle for Little Tich called Lord Tom Noddy (1896, with George Dance), Thrillby to a book by Joseph W. Herbert (1897) and The Maid of Athens (1897, produced by Carr). All were unsuccessful, although a number of individual songs from these musicals became popular, and some toured the British provinces.

Carr's post-1900 pieces included The Southern Belle (1901), The Rose of the Riviera (1903), Miss Mischief (1904) and The Scottish Bluebells (1906), all of which had at least a provincial success, but he never regained his early popularity. Carr also wrote many separate songs and some instrumental pieces. He also produced the score for a ballet produced at the Empire Theatre in 1907 called Sir Roger de Coverley.

He retired to the country in 1916 but almost immediately died of a heart attack in Uxbridge, Middlesex, England, at the age of 58.
