= Dorothy Talbot =

Dorothy Talbot may refer to:

- Dorothy Howard Talbot (1886–1965), English actress and director
- Dorothy Amaury Talbot (1871–1916), English plant collector and ethnographer
