= Avon Saxon =

Canadian operatic singer (c. 1857–1909)

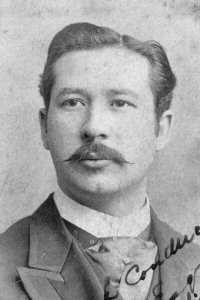
Avon Saxon

Avon Dawson Saxon (c. 1857 – 24 March 1909) was a Canadian operatic and concert singer who created the role of Friar Tuck in the romantic opera Ivanhoe (1891) by Arthur Sullivan and Julian Sturgis and Francal in Mirette by André Messager at the Savoy Theatre in 1894.

== Singing career ==
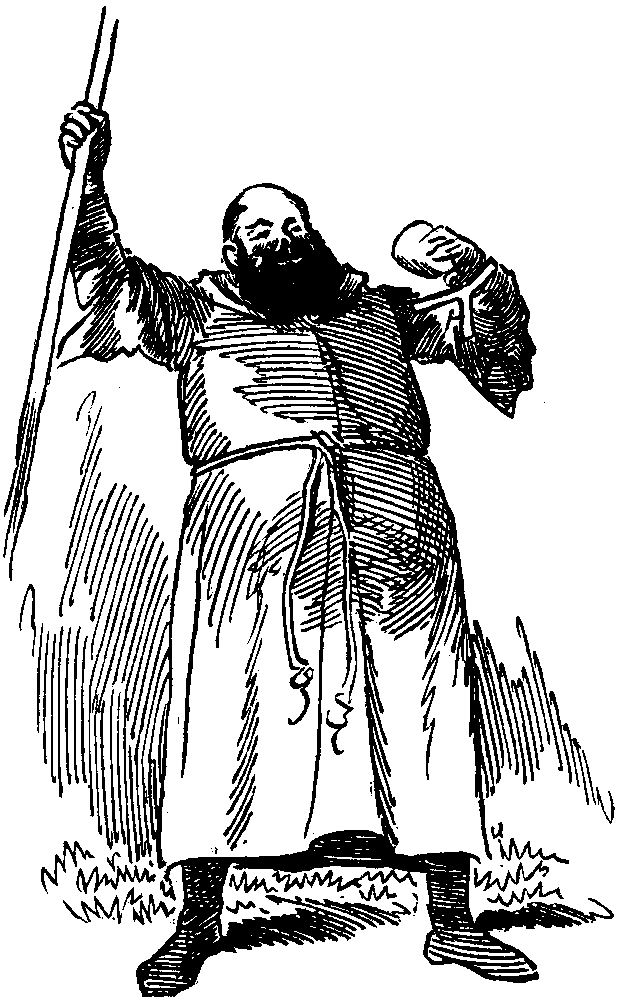
Saxon as Friar Tuck in Ivanhoe, drawn by Linley Sambourne for Punch (1891)

Avon Saxon was born in Grand-Pré near Windsor in Nova Scotia where his father had a farm, and was named after the River Avon. His brother George Saxon served as an officer in the United States Army. After the death of his father his mother married a Mr. Benjamin. Through this marriage Saxon had a half-brother, Luther Benjamin.

A bass-baritone, during January and February 1888 Saxon appeared in New York and Boston as a principal with the Boston Ideal Opera Company appearing in Victor, Fra Diavolo, La fille du régiment, The Bohemian Girl and Carmen. In August 1888, while appearing as principal baritone with the Amy Sherwin Opera Company in Melbourne in Australia he was charged with assault against an employee of the company over a trunk of costumes.

Moving to the United Kingdom, from January 1889 he sang Escamillo in Carmen for the Carl Rosa Opera Company; in April 1890 he sang in a concert with Miss Emily M'Laughlin at the Steinway Hall in London, while in October 1890 he sang in a concert with Marie Roze in The Athenaeum in Hartlepool, and for whom he was one of a quartet of vocalists billed as 'The Meister Singers'.

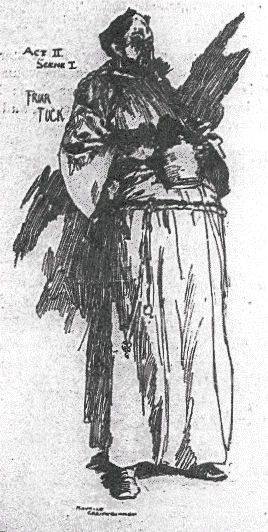
Saxon as Friar Tuck in Ivanhoe (1891), taken from the souvenir programme for the 100th performance

From January to June 1891 Saxon created the role of Friar Tuck in the romantic opera Ivanhoe by Arthur Sullivan and Julian Sturgis at the Royal English Opera House, reprising the role when the opera was revived for six performances in November 1891. The critic of The Times wrote of his performance, "Mr. Avon Saxon is in all respects an excellent Friar Tuck, burly and good-humoured; he may well be the latter, for he has the most taking number of the opera to sing, and delivers it with all possible effect."

In January 1892 he sailed from Southampton for Cape Town in South Africa; in February 1893 Saxon again travelled from the UK to South Africa with his wife, the singer Virginie Cheron, returning to the UK in October 1893 to begin rehearsals for the comic opera Wapping Old Stairs at the Vaudeville Theatre, in which he played Ben Brace during February and April 1894 opposite Courtice Pounds, Richard Temple and Herbert Sparling; from July to August 1894 he created the role of Francal, the gypsy chief in the opéra comique Mirette by André Messager at the Savoy Theatre in London. In September 1894 he opened as Major Victor Pulvereitzer in Jakobowski's comic opera The Queen of Brilliants, starring Lillian Russell at the Lyceum Theatre. Shortly after he returned to North America.

In August 1895 he premiered the song 'I fear no foe' by Ciro Pinsuti at the first Proms concert at the Queen's Hall in London. He appeared on the concert platform in Nova Scotia in Canada in 1898. In March 1899 Saxon returned to Hartlepool where he took part in a concert of sacred music at the Town Hall, while in May 1899 he sang in a concert at Blankney in Lincolnshire. In July 1899 he sang at a Dominion Day Celebration in London hosted by Lord Strathcona. In March 1900 he and his wife took part in a concert at Shoreditch Town Hall.

In March 1901 he sailed from London to Australia where in May 1901 he appeared with the Imperial Concert Company on the concert platform in Adelaide with his wife, singing on one occasion before the Duke and Duchess of York.

== Decline ==
In June 1907 he appeared before a magistrate in New York after he was found in a confused state on Sixth Avenue and was committed to a workhouse, presumably that in Blackwell's Island.

"Avon Saxon, who with great dignity and sweeping gesture, protested that he had been a great baritone, hung on the bar in the Jefferson Market Court yesterday and sang to Magistrate Breen. But his efforts were not appreciated and a court officer choked him off.
"Don't you think a few days in the workhouse would do you good?" asked the Magistrate.
"Yes. Let me take a month there," replied Saxon. "If I like it I'll take another." His request was granted.
"Tra-la-lala-la." he hummed and started singing again. Between the "las" he told the Magistrate he played the part of Escamillo, opposite Zélie de Lussan, the first time she sang Carmen. He took parts in all the best operas put on by the Boston Ideals, which, later, became the Bostonians, he said. His most important engagement was with the Royal English Opera Company in London, of which D'Oyly Carte is Director, he declared. His wife, he said, was Virginia Cheron, formerly of the Opera Comique of Paris, from whom he is divorced.
Saxon was picked up by Policeman Corevan of the Charles Street Station, who noticed his acting strangely on Sixth Avenue, near the Court House."

He died in March 1909 in the home of his half-brother Luther Benjamin in Berwick, Nova Scotia aged 52 after several months of illness.
