= Grisella Kingsland =

American actress

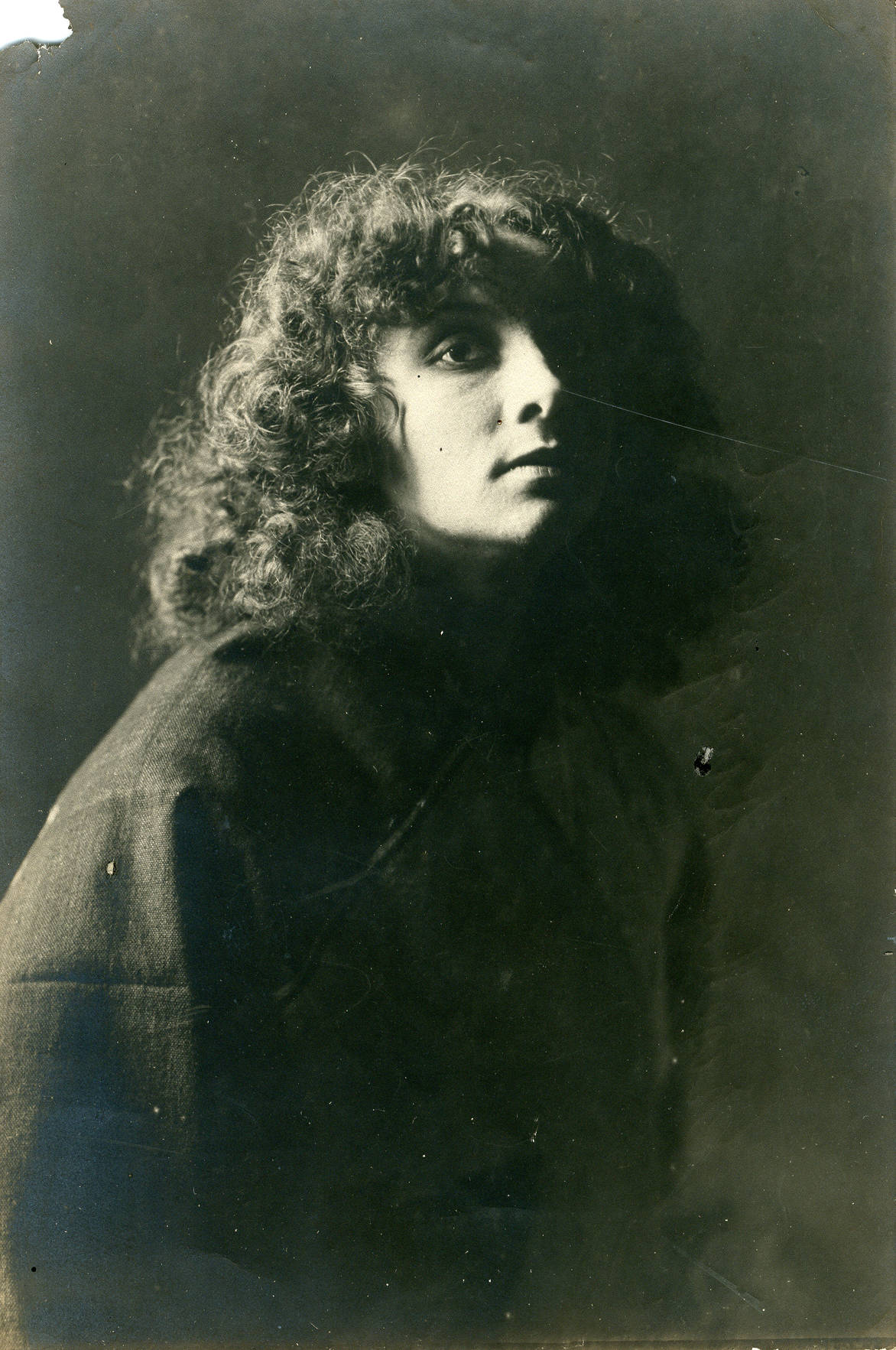
- Born: Grisella de Courcy Kingsland; February 13, 1882; San Francisco, California
- Died: March 8, 1955; San Francisco, California
- Other names: Griselle Kingsland, Griselda Kingsland, Grisella Chrystie
- Occupation: Actress

Grisella de Courcy Kingsland (February 13, 1882 – March 8, 1955) was an American actress based in San Francisco.

== Early life ==
Grisella Kingsland was born in San Francisco, the daughter of James Eli Camp Kingsland and Olivia de Courcy Kingsland. Her mother was an artist from Brooklyn. Her father was a sea captain from New Jersey. Grisella and her three siblings were children when their father died in 1889.

== Career ==
Kingsland was a stage actress, mostly on the San Francisco stage and touring with the Ferris Hartman Company on the West Coast, in soubrette roles. Her appearances included roles in Wang (1908), The Toymaker (1908), The King Maker (1908), The Girl from Paris (1909), A Chinese Honeymoon (1909), The Tenderfoot (1909), It Happened in Nordland (1909), and The Mayor of Tokio (1909).

Early in her career, Kingsland toured in New Zealand and Australia with the Josephine Stanton Company. She performed vaudeville acts with dancer Genevieve "Ginger" Love, and with Christine Neilson. She also toured with Luisa Tetrazzini's company in Mexico.

== Personal life ==
Kingsland married three times. Her first husband was William David Stein; they married in 1903 in Melbourne, and he died at sea in 1904, the same year their son, William David Kingsland Stein, was born. Her second husband was fellow performer Daun H. Seaton; they married and divorced in 1908. Her third husband was Percival H. Chrystie, a steel executive and banker in New Jersey; they married in 1913 and he died by suicide in 1932.

In 1934 Kingsland was on a cruise in the Mediterranean when she was robbed by "bandits" near Jerusalem. Her son died in 1951, and she died in 1955, aged 73 years, in San Francisco.
