= Morocco Bound =

Musical by F. Osmond Carr (music), Arthur Branscome (book) and Adrian Ross (lyrics)

Morocco Bound is a farcical Edwardian musical comedy in two acts by Arthur Branscombe, with music by F. Osmond Carr and lyrics by Adrian Ross. It opened at the Shaftesbury Theatre in London, on 13 April 1893, under the management of Fred J. Harris, and transferred to the Trafalgar Square Theatre on 8 January 1894, running for a total of 295 performances. A young George Grossmith, Jr. was in the cast (where he made the most of the small role of Sir Percy Pimpleton by adding ad-libs), as was Letty Lind. Harry Grattan and Richard Temple later joined the cast.

This musical opened in the same year as Gilbert and Sullivan's Utopia, Limited and shared a number of features with that opera, including a distant, exotic locale, and both presented British archetypes as exemplars. Morocco Bound crystallized the music-hall influenced "variety musical" form and was more representative than Utopia of the prevailing taste of London theatre audiences, which was turning away from comic opera.

== Roles ==
Letty Lind and Alfred C. Seymour as Maude and Dolly

- Spoofah Bey (An Irish Con-Man) - Mr. John L. Shine
- Squire Higgins (One Of The Nouveau-Riche) - Charles Danby
- Vivian Higgins (The Squire's Eldest Son) - Sydney Barraclough
- Dolly Higgins (Another Of The Squire's Sons) - Alfred C. Seymour
- Josiah Higgins (The Squire's Brother) - Herbert Sparling
- Lord Percy Pimpleton - George Grossmith Jr.
- Sid Fakah (Moroccan Grand Vizier) - Colin Coop
- Musket (A Servant) - Douglas Munro
- Maude Sportington (Dolly's Girl-Friend) - Letty Lind
- Ethel Sportington (Vivian's Girl-Friend) - Violet Cameron
- Comtesse De La Blague (Spoofah's Sister, A Phoney "Countess") - Jennie McNulty
- Lady Walkover (Maude's Friend) - Agnes Hewitt
- Rhea Porter (A Lady Journalist) - Marie Studholme
- Eva Sketchley - Eva Westlake
- Hilda Adlette - Ruby Temple

== Synopsis ==
An Irish adventurer enlists the help of a retired costermonger and an assortment of British characters to travel to Morocco, where the Irishman had hopes of winning the right to sell theatre concessions. Once there, he fools the local Vizier into believing that his companions are representatives of "the flower of the British music hall" and eventually secures his business venture.

== Musical numbers ==
Act I - Mokeleigh Hall, an English stately home

- No. 1 - Opening Chorus - "England is diversified by eligible mansions..."
- No. 2 - Song - Musket - "I've serv'd the boards of 'aughty lords..." (three verses)
- No. 3 - Duet - Maude & Lady Walkover - "The latest social appetite, of course, you know..."
- No. 4 - Song - Ethel - "When maidens fair in days of old..."
- No. 5 - Song - Spoofah - "If I had cash to cut a dash, I'd run as straight as any..."
- No. 6 - Duet - Comtesse & Spoofah - "In pastoral seclusion how happily we'll fare..."
- No. 7 - Chorus - "Hurrah, hurrah, hurrah, hurrah for the Squire..."
- No. 8 - Song - Squire ("Honesty Jim") - "I never 'ad friends for to foster, or give me a show at a stall..."
- No. 9 - Chorus and Solos - Vivian & Squire - "Gladly greet our future master, welcome home our coming lord..."
- No. 10 - Song - Ethel - "If I were a royal lady, and he were of low degree..."
- No. 11 - Trio and Dance - Spoofah, Squire & Josiah - "The thought of ev'ry Englishman, who's not a Laboucherian..."
- No. 12 - Song - Vivian - "Stars come out in the skies that darken, silent above..."
- No. 13 - Pas Seul
- No. 14 - Duet - Ethel & Vivian - "There's a word, or possibly two..."
- No. 15 - Song - Spoofah & Chorus - "I have stay'd for a time at each palace sublime..."
- No. 16 - Finale Act I - "I'll tell you what I'll do..."

Act II - The Palace of Spoofah Beh in Old Tangier, Morocco

- No. 1 - Opening Chorus Act II - "Fareshah! Fareshah! Fareshah! Mareshah! Chareshah oum!..."
- No. 2 - Song - Vizier, with Chorus - "I am the very Grand Vizier, to all the land extremely dear..."
- No. 2a - "Morocco Boot" - Grotesque Exit
- No. 3 - Scene and Song - Squire, with Chorus - "My lord, it comes..."
- No. 4 - Song - Vivian - "Light of love that only made my life so bright..."
- No. 5 - Chorus - "Once more we have the leave to enter in procession..."
- No. 6 - Song - Maude and Chorus - "I'm the queen of merry Monaco, known to all the visitors who go..."
- No. 7 - Drinking Song (singer unspecified) - "Oh, morning bids the hunter wake and blow the merry horn..."
- No. 8 - Song - Spoofah and Chorus - "I will tell you all that happen'd to the thranscendental [sic] plan..."
- No. 9 - Cymbal Dance - Pas Seul
- No. 10 - Duet - Squire and Spoofah - "If you go to a swell Music Hall..."
- No. 11 - Concerted Piece - Finale - The Red Morocco Boot - "If you should ask for our advice..."
