= Charles Danby =

British actor, singer and comedian

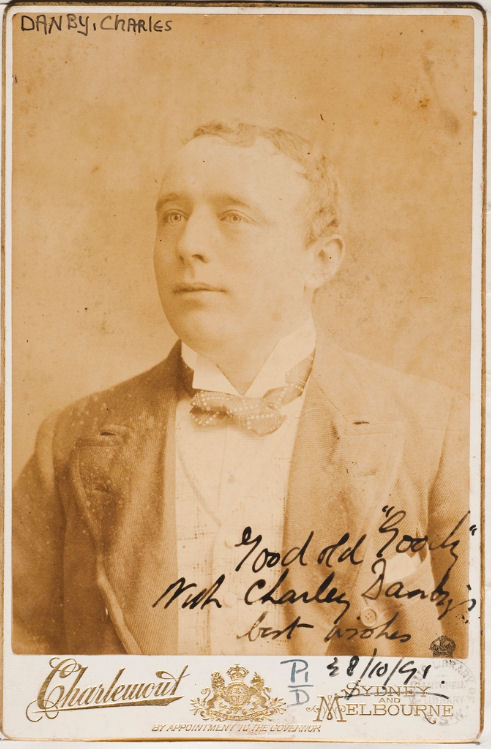
Charles Danby in a carte de visite of 1891

Charles Clemson Percy Danby (1858 – 7 September 1906) was a British actor, singer and comedian of the late Victorian era who regularly appeared at the Gaiety Theatre in London. During his career he made 37 tours of the United States and three of Australia.

== Early life and first marriage ==
Danby was born in Newport, Monmouth, Wales, the son of Susan née Hickman and Charles Danby, an architect. On the 1881 Census he is listed as an "Actor Comedian". On 16 January 1882 he married Frances "Fanny" David (1859–after 1918) at the church of St John the Evangelist in Leeds, Yorkshire. Their son was Charles David Danby MC (1887–1918) who was killed in a flying accident having served as a captain in the RFC during World War I. Fanny began divorce proceedings against him in 1890, gaining a decree absolute in 1892 on account of his physical cruelty to her and his adultery with various women throughout their marriage, including the actress Florence Levey, with whose parents he was residing in 1891.

== Career ==
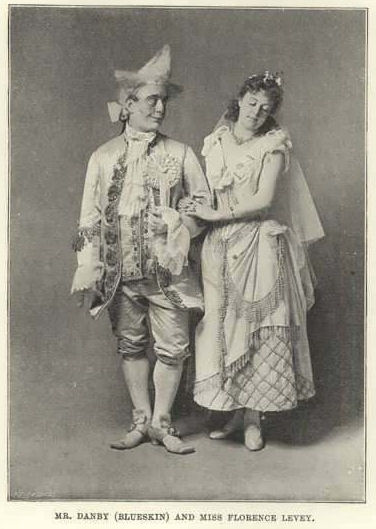
Danby as Blueskin and Florence Levey as Polly Stanmore in the revival of Little Jack Sheppard (1894)

His first success on the London stage was as Morel in Monte Cristo Jr. at the Gaiety Theatre (1886) and in a tour of Australia in 1888/9 and the United States in 1889; he played Captain Sneak in a revival of Alfred Cellier's The Sultan of Mocha (1887); Don Salluste in Ruy Blas and the Blasé Roué at the Gaiety Theatre (1889); Valentine in Faust up to Date in an American tour with the Gaiety Company (1890); Jacques Darc in the burlesque Joan of Arc at the Opera Comique (1891); Sir Ludgate Hill in Cinder Ellen up too Late at the Gaiety Theatre (1891); Squire Higgins in Morocco Bound at the Shaftesbury Theatre (1893), a role he played over 500 times; Roberts in The Lady Slavey at the Royal Avenue Theatre (1894) of which The critic for The Sketch wrote, "Mr. Charles Danby's dictionary probably does not contain the word "subtlety", yet his vast energy and broad sense of humour are far more useful, and certainly, whatever you may think of the means he uses, he is one of the funniest players in his line" and after at the Casino Theatre in New York (1896); he was Blueskin opposite Ellaline Terriss as Winifred and his then mistress Florence Levey as Polly Stanmore in a revival of Little Jack Sheppard at the Gaiety Theatre (1894); and Griffard in The Cadet Girl at the Herald Square Theatre on Broadway (1900).

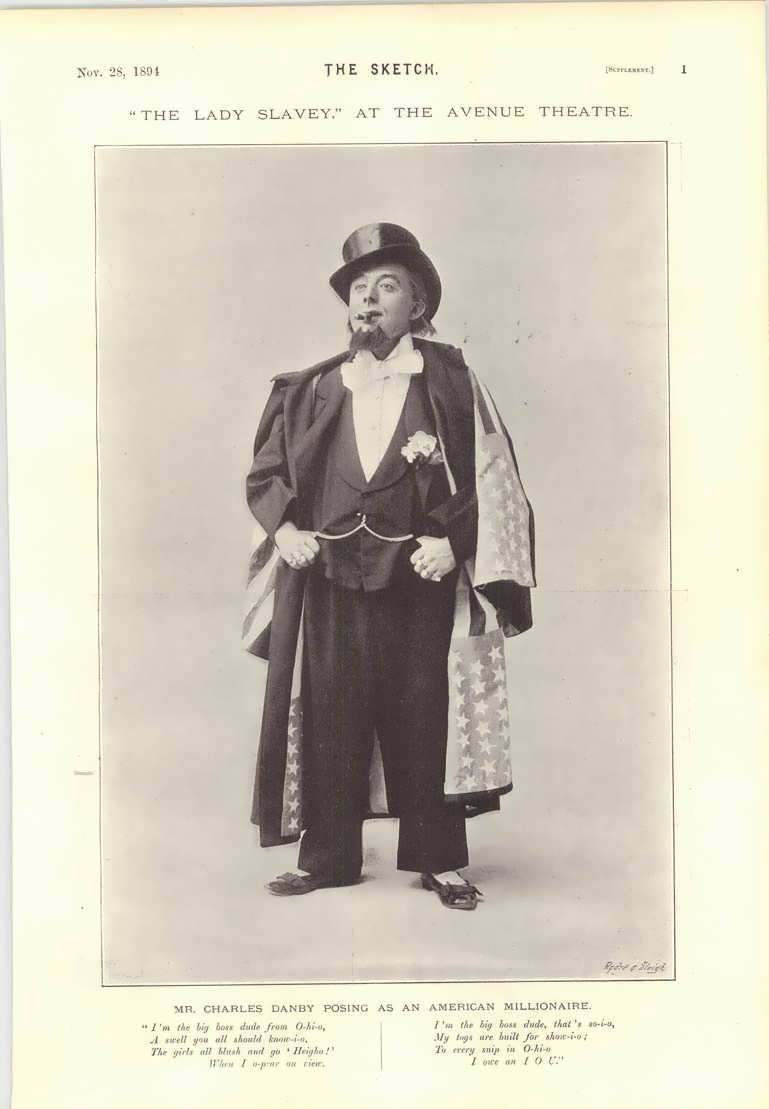
Charles Danby as Roberts in The Lady Slavey (1894)

In 1893 he was initiated as a Freemason into The Eccentric Lodge No. 2488.

On the arrest of Oscar Wilde for sodomy in 1895 it was a telegram from Danby that the Marquess of Queensberry proudly flourished which read, "Hearty Congratulations".

Much of Danby's career was spent in the United States, which he toured 37 times, and it was here that he met his second wife, Alexia Bassian (1876–1948), an Armenian soprano, who he married on 26 February 1899 (shortly after midnight February 15, 1899) in Norfolk, Virginia, in the Ladies Palor of The Monticello Hotel. She returned with him to the United Kingdom. In 1899 Danby and his new wife appeared together in an American tour of The Geisha in the roles of Juliette Diamant and Captain Wun-Hi.

In 1905 his wife Alexia Bassian Danby made a seven-month tour of Australia for J. C. Williamson in the principal soprano roles in several of the works of Gilbert and Sullivan, including Josephine in H.M.S. Pinafore. Apparently, Danby had not been booked for the tour but Williamson allowed him to play the Bosun's mate in Pinafore and the Sergeant of Police in The Pirates of Penzance. A witness writing in The Bulletin in 1925 recalled Danby's "performance was funny in a way, but I doubt if Gilbert would have recognised his lines or Sullivan his music. Poor Charlie did not last long."

On returning to the United Kingdom from Australia Danby discovered that he had developed cancer of the jaw, his life being only prolonged by surgical operations. His wife Alexia gave up her own career to nurse him during his last months and weeks at which time the couple were supported by a benefit organised by his old theatrical colleagues.

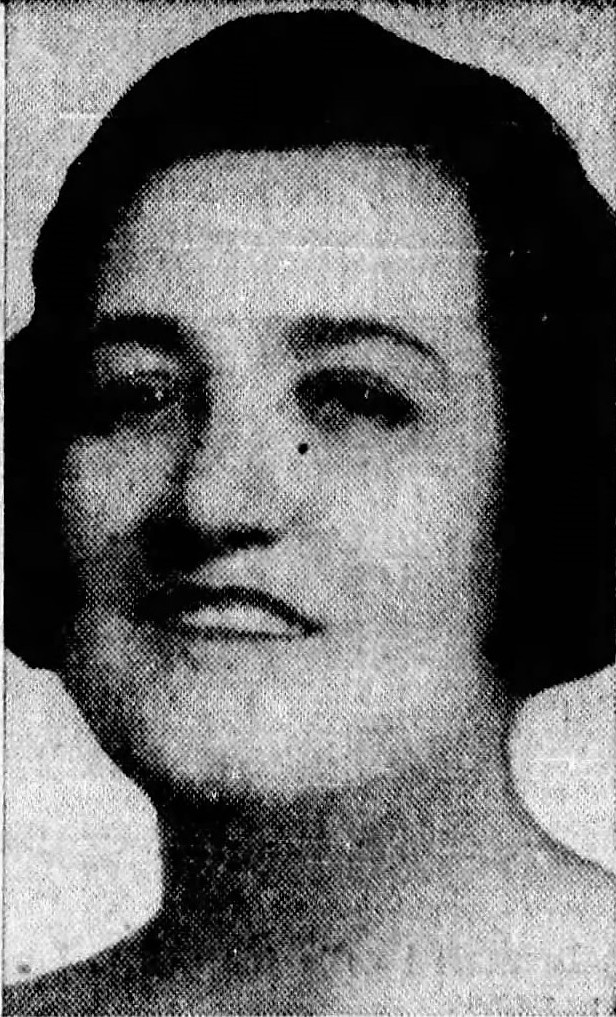
Alexia Bassian as Los Angeles voice teacher, 1941

Danby died in Paddington, London, in 1906 aged 49. In 1929 his widow, by now a singer and teacher, returned to the United States.
