= The Lady Slavey =

1894 Operetta

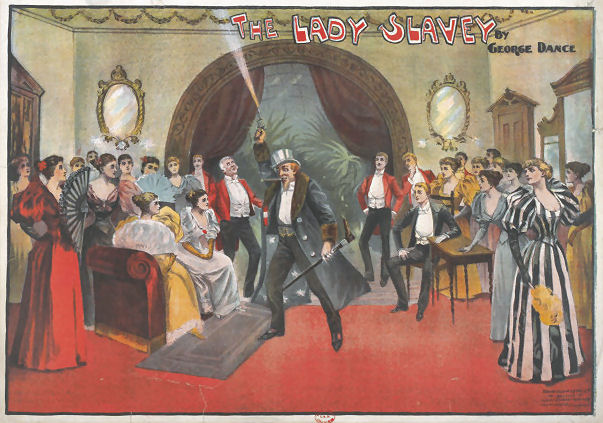
Poster for The Lady Slavey (1894)

The Lady Slavey was an 1894 operetta in two acts with a score by John Crook (with contributions by Henry Wood and Letty Lind, among others), to a libretto by George Dance (with additional lyrics by Adrian Ross, among others) which opened at the Royal Avenue Theatre in London on 20 October 1894 and which featured May Yohé and Jennie McNulty. After a major rewrite to make it more suitable for American audiences it opened at the Casino Theatre on Broadway on 3 February 1896 where it ran for 128 performances with additional lyrics by Hugh Morton and music by Gustave Adolph Kerker.

== Synopsis ==
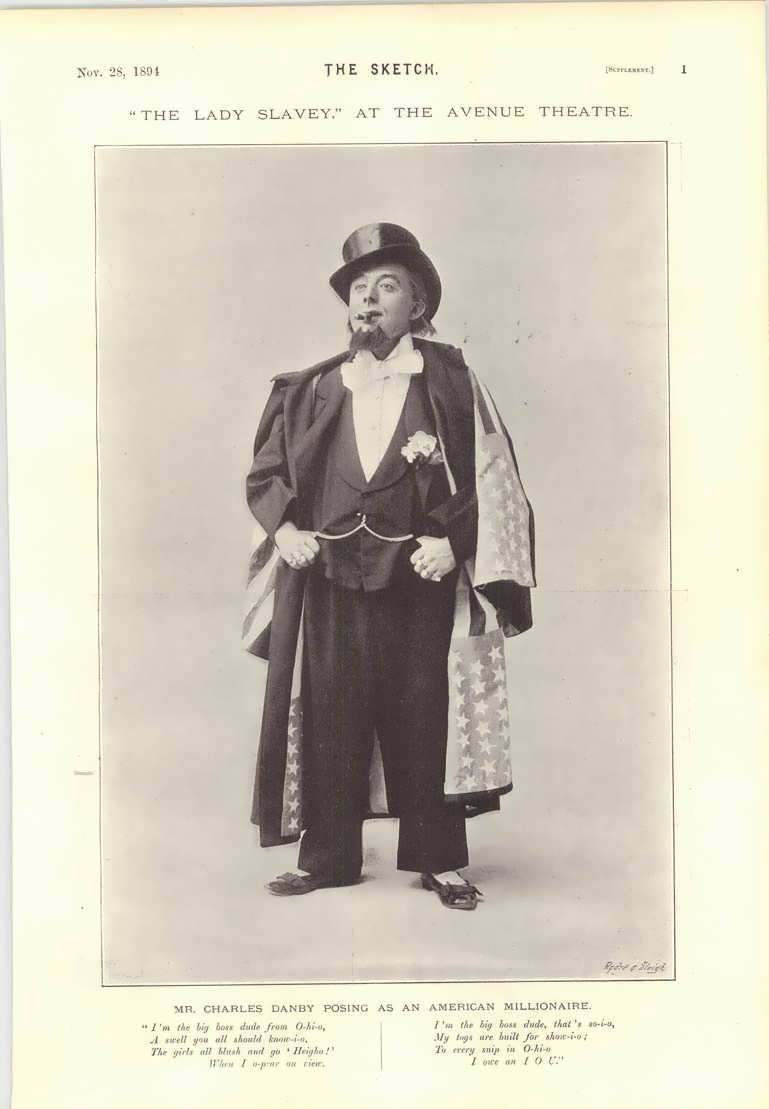
Charles Danby as Roberts, the Sheriff's Officer, posing as an American millionaire

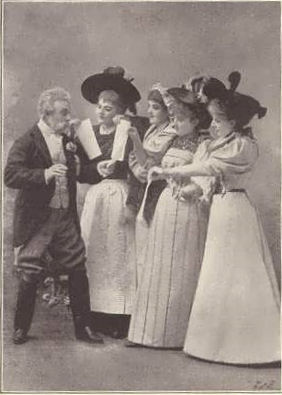
Robert Pateman as Major O'Neill meets his Creditors

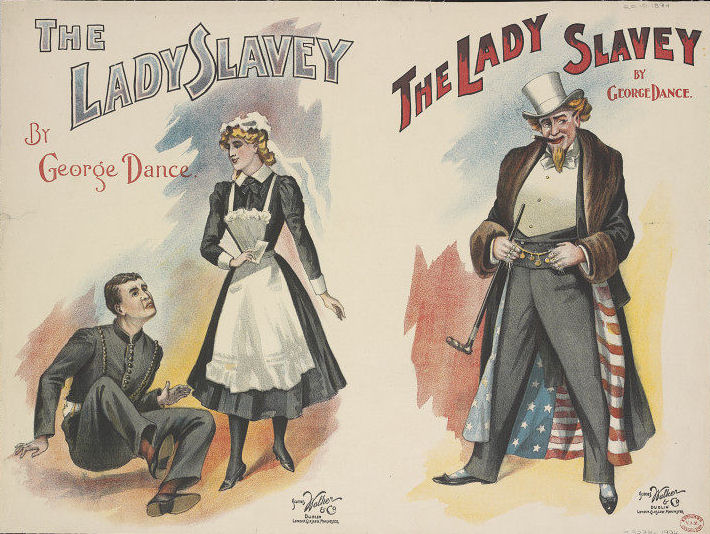
Theatrical poster for The Lady Slavey (1894)

Based on the story of Cinderella, Irishman Major O'Neill (Robert Pateman) is faced with bankruptcy and financial ruin after running up large milliners bills for his daughters Maud (Adelaide Astor) and Beatrice (Blanche Barnett). In an attempt to stave off this disaster, with the assistance of Flo Honeydew (Jennie McNulty) he attempts to marry off his youngest daughter Phyllis (May Yohé) - the slavey of the title (Note: "Slavey" is slang for a household servant, or a person that does menial work.) - to a rich man she doesn't love. Phyllis loves Vincent A. Evelyn (Henry Beaumont). She, assisted by Roberts, a Sheriff's Officer (Charles Danby) is determined to avoid this fate. Roberts enters disguised as an American millionaire to thwart the plan. All ends well and Phyllis is united with her true love.

== Productions ==
After its premiere at the Opera House in Northampton in 1893 The Lady Slavey was produced by William Greet at the Royal Avenue Theatre in London from October 1894 to January 1895 with Henry Wood as the conductor. The role of Phyllis in the first tour of 1893 was created by Kitty Loftus. During an early stage of one of the show's various British tours from 1893 to 1907 the conductor was Howard Talbot.

The Lady Slavey had a lot of competition in London in 1894, which saw the openings of The Chieftain by Arthur Sullivan and F. C. Burnand, His Excellency by F. Osmond Carr and W. S. Gilbert, Go-Bang by Adrian Ross and Carr, Wapping Old Stairs by Stuart Robertson and Howard Talbot, a revival of Little Jack Sheppard by Meyer Lutz and H. P. Stephens at the Gaiety Theatre, Mirette by André Messager and Ross, and The Shop Girl, an extremely successful musical comedy by H. J. W. Dam, Ivan Caryll, Lionel Monckton and Ross.

The critic for The Sketch wrote:

"Mr. William Greet, in producing The Lady Slavey at the Avenue Theatre, seemed like a rash man. Success seems to have justified his rashness. Yet, at first, failure seemed to be the certain fate of The Lady Slavey. It is a striking proof of the vitality of the work that it survived the harsh notices of the critics and cold reception of the first-nighters. To a great extent, it is a question of company. Miss May Yohé's singing does not satisfy the exacting critics, nor does her acting endanger other reputations; but her strange voice, her charming person, and unflagging spirits quickly catch and hold the audience. Mr. Charles Danby's dictionary probably does not contain the word "subtlety", yet his vast energy and broad sense of humour are far more useful, and certainly, whatever you may think of the means he uses, he is one of the funniest players in his line. Cinderella's "Sisters" are a delightful change from old ideas. Perhaps they rather hurt the tale, for the admirable singing of the handsome Miss Blanche Barnett and the dainty dancing of Miss Adelaide Astor make them dangerous rivals for the heroine. Mr. Robert Pateman, one of our most versatile and able players - who will forget his "horse" song in Mdlle. Nitouche, or his terrible death scene in the Princesses' melodrama Master and Man? - might have a better part with advantage to the work. The acting of Mr. G. Humphrey is also very clever."

The Lady Slavey had a run of less than a week at the Lafayette Square Opera House in Washington D.C. before George Lederer's production opened at the Casino Theatre on Broadway on 3 February 1896 where it ran for 128 performances. Lederer instructed Dance to "Americanize" the piece and it was put on with new lyrics by Hugh Morton and a score by Gustave Adolph Kerker. The lazy Sheriff (Charles Danby) is set the task of reclaiming the estate of a bankrupt Englishman. In an attempt to stave off financial ruin the Englishman tries to marry off his daughter, the slavey of the title (Virginia Earle) to a wealthy young heir with the assistance of Flo Honeydew (Marie Dressler).

The actress Marie Dressler had her first starring role as Flo Honeydew in this production which she performed for four years, two years of which were on tour. The critic of The New York Times called Dressler, "...an utterly preposterous music hall performer" while another stated of her, "It was hardly a case of acting. Better call it a case of letting herself go... She seemed a big, overgrown girl and a thoroughly mischievous romp with the agility of a circus performer and the physical elasticity of a professional contortionist... Her comic resource was inexhaustible, her animal spirits irrepressible and her audacity approached the sublime."

A production was held at the Prince's Theatre in Bristol (1893-1894), while in 1897 Robert Courtneidge revived The Lady Slavey at the Prince's Theatre in Manchester. In 1900 the actress Madge Lessing played the title role when the work was revived in Boston in the USA.

== London cast ==
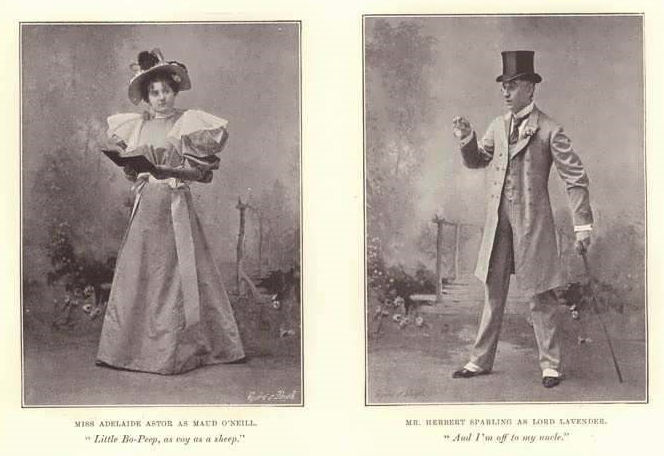
Adelaide Astor as Maud O'Neill and Herbert Sparling as Lord Lavender

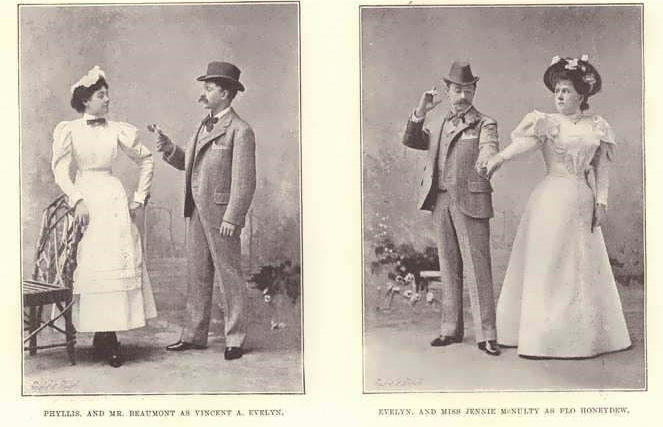
May Yohé as Phyllis and Henry Beaumont as Vincent A. Evelyn; Beaumont as Vincent A. Evelyn and Jennie McNulty as Flo Honeydew

- Roberts (a Sheriff's Officer) - Charles Danby
- Major O'Neill - Robert Pateman
- Vincent A. Evelyn - Henry Beaumont/James Leverett
- Lord Lavender - Herbert Sparling
- Captain Fitz Norris (a Sheriff's Officer) - George Humphrey]
- Flo Honeydew - Jennie McNulty
- Maud (Major O'Neill's Daughter) - Adelaide Astor/Lizzie Ruggles
- Beatrice (Major O'Neill's Daughter) - Blanche Barnett/Beatrice Granville
- Madame Pontet (Milliner) - Miss Elcho
- Madame Louise (Milliner) - Irene Du Foye
- Liza (a Flower Girl) - Miss Maryon/Rita Yorke/Julie Donna
- Emma (a Laundress) - Phoebe Turner/Miss Desmond
- Phyllis (The Lady Slavey) - May Yohé

== New York cast ==
The original cast at the Casino Theatre in New York in 1896 included:

- Roberts - Charles Danby (later replaced by Walter Jones)
- William Endymion Sykes - Dan Daly
- Vincent Evelyn - Charles Dickson
- Major Tolliver - Henry Norman
- Lord Lavender - Richard Carle
- Ikey Dinkelbinkel - Charles Kirke
- Artemus Snipe - Nicholas Burnham
- Phyllis - Virginia Earle
- Flo Honeydew - Marie Dressler
- Beatrice - Linda da Costa
- Maud - Delia Stacey
- Marjorie - Mabelle Wallace Howe

== Songs ==
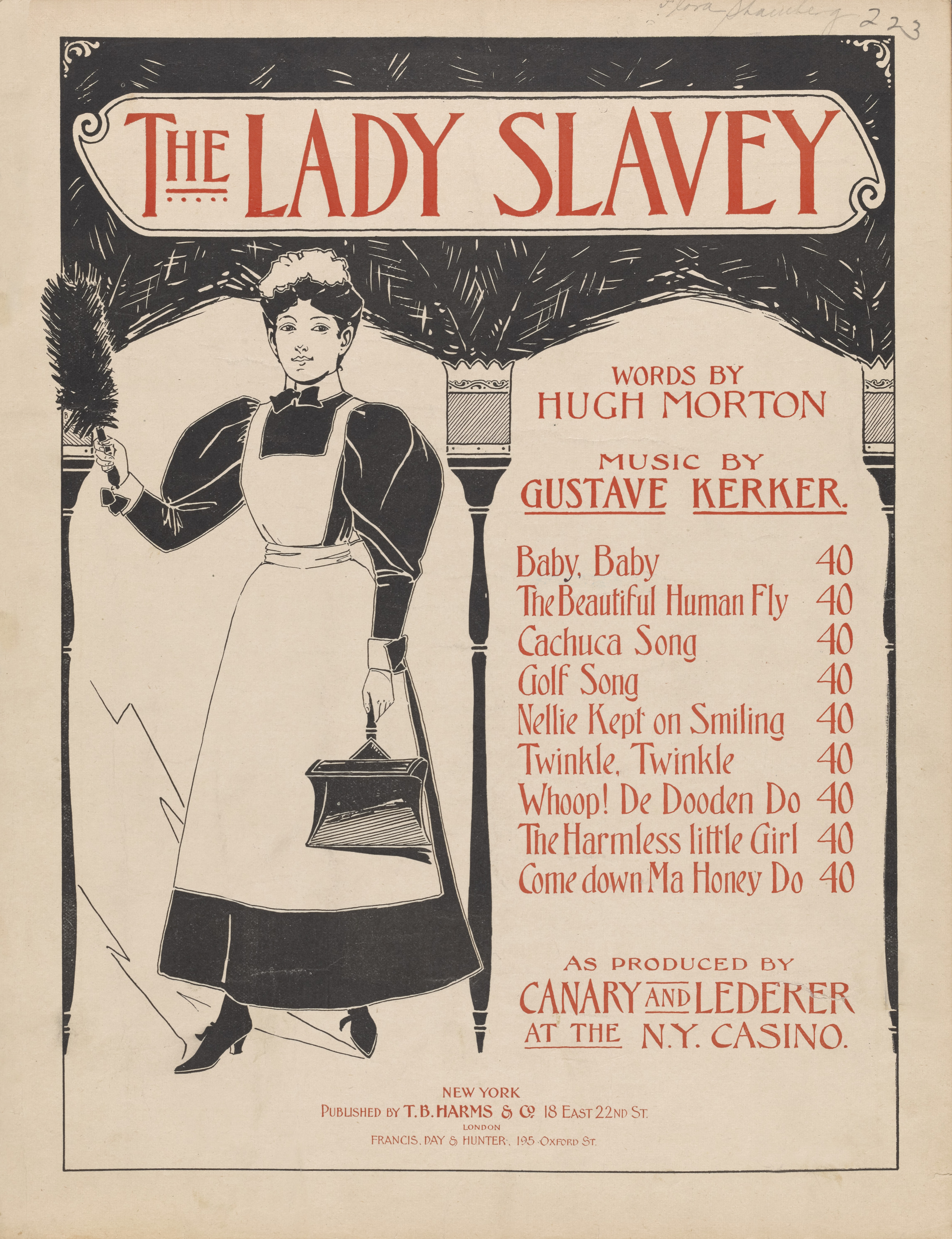
Sheet music for the American production of The Lady Slavey (1896)

=== ACT I - The Lawn of the Manor House, Rookholme ===
- No. 1 - Chorus - "We're sorry to trouble you, Major O'Neill, but duty compels us to call"
- No. 2 - Major O'Neill & Chorus - "Of all the noble Irishmen upon the scroll of fame, St. Patrick stands pre-eminent"
- No. 3 - Phyllis - "Was there ever any poor girl so run after? I can't imagine why it should be so" (Words by Joseph Watson to music by Mary Watson)
- No. 4 - Song and Chorus (soloist unspecified) - "Oh! list to me in silence while in solemn tones I tell"
- No. 5 - Beatrice and Vincent - "Why love in secret? Why not confess" (Music by George Dance, Henry Wood and Joseph Hart)
- No. 6 - Finale Act I - "One, two, three, four, five. Five o'clock chimes from the ivory tower"

=== Act II - Reception Hall at the Manor House, Rookholme ===
- No. 7 - Chorus - "Nature doth fashion the Lord and the Lady, hence our refinement of elegant skill"
- No. 8 - Vincent - "Must we say farewell, dear heart? Must we part in bitter sorrow?" (Music by George Dance and Charles Graham)
- No. 9 - Phyllis - "How throbs my heart when I recall that last and long 'goodbye'" (Music by Frank S. N. Isitt)
- No. 10 - Roberts & Phyllis - "It is a wise young child, they say, that knows its own papa" (eight verses)
- No. 11 - The Animal Duet - Roberts & Phyllis - "Each bird and beast upon the earth salutes its mate in song" (six verses)
- No. 12 - Chorus - "Welcome, welcome Millionaire, be he plain or be he fair, wealth doth each defect repair"
- No. 13 - Roberts and Chorus - "Guess you fancy I'm no wonder, guess again, you ain't correct"
- No. 14 - Song and Chorus (soloist unspecified) - "Lo, the golden sun is setting, all the world is hush'd and still"
- No. 15 - Phyllis - "I have left the old plantation now, 'tis many years ago" (Words by Herbert Walther to music by Alfred Cammeyer)
- No. 16 - Song and Dance - Maud - "When quite a little girl, in shorter frocks than these" (Words by Adrian Ross to music by Letty Lind)
- No. 17 - Phyllis - "Of all the sports, there's none can beat a ride upon a gee"
- No. 18 - Finale Act II - "My darling Phyllis I have won ... a lucky girl is she"
