= Dorothy Howard Talbot =

English actress and director (1886–1965)

- Born: Dorothy Maud Cross; 1886; Dersingham, Norfolk, England
- Died: 5 December 1965 (aged 78–79); Nottingham, England
- Occupation: Theatre director
- Years active: 1910–1958
- Spouse: Howard Talbot (m. 1910; died 1928)
- Children: 4
- Father: Arthur Harry Cross

Dorothy Howard Talbot (born Dorothy Maud Cross; 1886 – 5 December 1965) was an English actress and director. After a brief acting career as Dorothy Langton, she married the musical theatre composer Howard Talbot in 1910 and left the stage. She worked in stage management during the First World War in the West End. From the 1920s to the 1950s, she was hired to direct musicals and light opera for amateur operatic and dramatic societies, at a time when there were few women performing this role.

== Early life ==
Dorothy was born in Dersingham, Norfolk, the oldest daughter of Arthur Harry Cross, who was organist at St Mary Magdalene Church, Sandringham, from 1878 until his death in 1906. Her early education was at the West Norfolk and Lynn High School for Girls. She studied at RADA for three terms during 1908, and while there she met the dramatist W. S. Gilbert.

She performed on the stage for a few years, using the stage name Dorothy Langton, but gave up acting after her marriage in 1910 to Howard Talbot, a composer of music for Edwardian musical comedy. She then coached for Charles Hawtry's productions.

During the first world war she assisted in stage management at the Adelphi Theatre, London, at which her husband was conductor.

== Theatre director ==
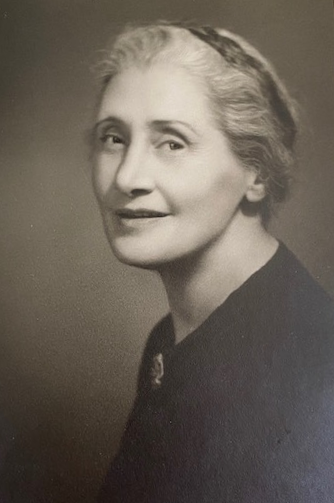
Dorothy Howard Talbot

After her husband died of lung disease in 1928, Talbot enrolled with the National Operatic and Dramatic Association (NODA), which enabled her to stage musical plays. She also lectured on courses that NODA organised.

Talbot staged light operas, musicals and plays for the societies listed in the table below, amongst many others. She thought it best to rehearse amateur casts for 4-5 weeks before a production, with a dress rehearsal on the Sunday before opening, which was a departure from the earlier practise among amateur British societies, to avoid Sunday rehearsals.

In 1953 she decided to focus on directing and acting in Nottingham where she lived for the last years of her life.

Bletchingley and District Amateur Operatic Society		Newton Abbot Dramatic Society		Bury St Edmunds Amateur Operatic and Dramatic Society		Lincoln Thespians Operatic and Dramatic Society	
Musical/Opera	Year	Musical/Opera	Year	Musical/Opera	Year	Musical/Opera	Year
Patience	1925	Chu Chin Chow	1939	The Belle of New York	1948	The Arcadians	1930
The Gondoliers	1926	Miss Hook of Holland	1947	Show Boat	1949	My Lady Frayle	1931
The Mikado	1927	The Rebel Maid	1948	Torquay Operatic Society		The Geisha	1934
Ruddigore	1929	The Geisha	1949	Ruddigore	1949	The Maid of the Mountains	1936
A Chinese Honeymoon	1933	A Country Girl	1950	The Pirates of Penzance; Trial by Jury	1950	West Bridgford Amateur Operatic Society	
The Belle of Brittany	1935			Utopia, Limited	1951	Ruddigore	1953
Iolanthe	1936			Waltz Times	1952	Patience	1955
Princess Ida	1937			The Mikado	1953	The Pirates of Penzance; Cox and Box	1956

Southport Orpheus Operatic Society		Cooperative Arts Centre Nottingham	
Musical/Opera	Year	Opera/Play	Year
Madame Pompadour	1934	Before the Flood	1956
East Surrey Amateur Operatic and Dramatic Society		Dear Charles	1958
Veronique	1923	L'elisir d'amore	1958
H.M.S. Pinafore	1925	The Crucible	1957
If I Were King (acted)	1925	One Wild Oat	1957

== Other activities ==
In 1925, Dorothy and her husband set up the Bletchingley and District Amateur Operatic Society with Howard as chair and herself as honorary director.

She wrote a libretto with Percy Greenbank, from which a three-act comic opera, called Her Ladyship, was produced, with lyrics by Percy Greenbank and music by her husband, Howard Talbot. The opera was performed for the first time by the Stock Exchange Dramatic and Operatic Society at the Scala Theatre in London on 24 April 1928.

She also lectured regularly in drama courses held at the Nottingham Co-operative Arts Centre and other venues and wrote a book about stage makeup.

During the second world war Talbot worked as a full time warden in Chelsea and also directed a play, The Dark Lady, with a new theatre club called the Carlyle Players, which she helped to found.
