= Dorothy Amaury Talbot =

English plant collector and ethnographer (1871–1916)

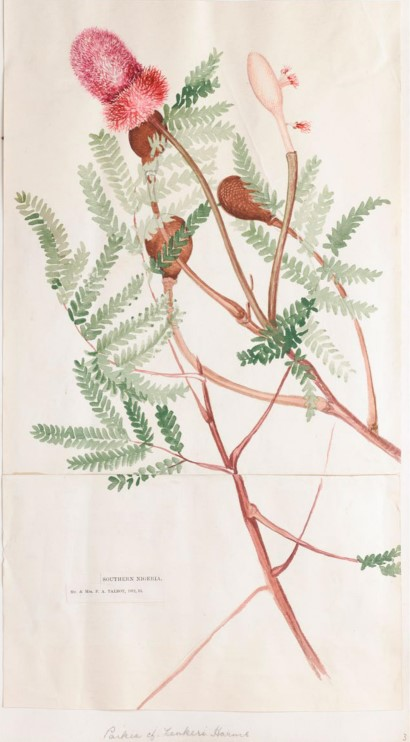
Painting of Parkia bicolor A. Chev by Dorothy Amaury Talbot

Dorothy Amaury Talbot (née Amaury, 1871–1916) was an English plant collector and ethnographer in Nigeria. She and her husband and sister collected over 4000 Nigerian plant species, including newly discovered ones. She also studied and wrote on the Ibibio people.

Born in 1871, Dorothy married Percy Talbot, a colonial civil servant. She and her sister, Miss Amaury, accompanied him on several long stints of being stationed in Nigeria as a surveyor. They periodically sent plant collections back to Britain until her death.

== Plant collection ==
In 1910–11, Dorothy undertook a circular journey around Nigeria with her husband and fellow plant collector Olive MacLeod, collecting and painting Nigerian plants. A further collection from the Eket district followed in 1912–1913 when the Talbots and Miss Amaury were stationed there. Their collection, along with about a thousand drawings of the plants produced by Dorothy, was presented to the Natural History Museum. To the British Museum they gave about 4000 botanical and zoological specimens as well as making gifts to Kew Gardens.

The genus Talbotiella was named for the Talbots, with Dorothea talbotii Wernham being named for Dorothy individually.

== Ethnography ==
Dorothy and her husband were also interested in the ethnography of the Ibibio people, who they saw as largely unaffected by contact with white people until their arrival. They collected representative artifacts from them, and Dorothy's book Woman's Mysteries of a Primitive People: The Ibibios of Southern Nigeria was published in 1915.

Dorothy established the Percy Amaury Talbot prize for African anthropology, administered by the Royal Anthropological Institute.

She died in Degama, Nigeria, on 28 December 1916 from malaria.
