= Herbert Sparling =

British actor and director (1864–1944)

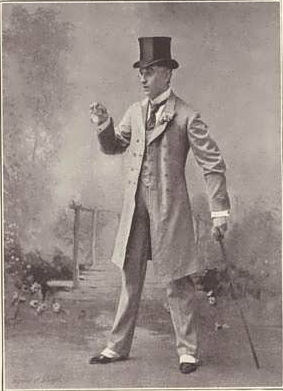
Herbert Sparling in The Lady Slavey (1894)

Herbert Sparling (1864–1944) was a British comedy and musical theatre actor and director.

== London stage ==
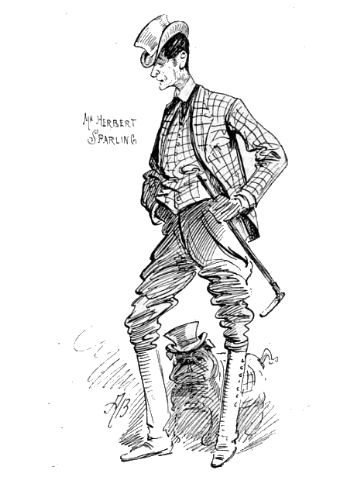
as Josiah Higgins in Morocco Bound (1893)

In early days in London, Sparling played opposite Alice Atherton in an Albert Chevalier skit, and with her in the T. Gideon Warren and Willie Edouin play Our Daughters (where he "did all that was possible with a colourless character"). Chevalier at the beginning of his career associated with Sparling, "in whose drawing room most of the Chevalier 'first efforts' took shape and form". According to Edward Lawrence Levy, Sparling was "the first man to sing Chevalier's songs in Birmingham". Levy also noted a Birmingham occasion, with George Robey, when a review wrote "Sparling accompanied himself at the piano in a clever composition of his own".

In 1889 Sparling was sued for breach of contract at Brompton County Court by the "dramatic author" Henry Plunkett Grattan (1808–1889), who alleged that in 1887 he and Sparling had made an agreement that Grattan would rewrite a drama for Sparling in return for which he would receive periodic payments from Sparling. When asked for the second payment Sparling made various excuses and quit his lodgings on The Strand. The outcome was that Grattan was awarded £10 for the work he had already done.

Sparling appeared as Dudley Harcourt in My Sweetheart at Prince's Theatre, Bristol in 1889; and then in 1891 at the Vaudeville Theatre. He was Luigi Di Volpa in F. C. Burnand's Private Enquiry (1891) at the Strand Theatre; Lyngstrand in Ibsen's The Lady from the Sea (1891) at Terry's Theatre.

As Josiah Higgins in Morocco Bound (1893), Sparling shared a trio with George Grossmith Jr. and Colin Coop. The following year he was Sir Wormwood Scrubs in Howard Talbot's comic opera Wapping Old Stairs; Lord Lavender in The Lady Slavey (1894); the Detective in A Melodrama at the Trafalgar Theatre (1894).

Sparling played William Piddock in 22A, Curzon Street at the Garrick Theatre (1898).

== US tour ==
Sparling took part in an American tour of A Little Ray of Sunshine (1899) which played at Chickering Hall in Boston and Wallack's Theatre in New York among other venues. He had created the role of Marcus Pomponius in A Greek Slave in London, and reprised it at the Herald Square Theatre in New York in November 1899. At this time Sparling was writing songs, some of which were published in London in 1900. He has been identified as the composer of a song setting offered to the Ben Hur author Lew Wallace, a production of the Ben Hur musical having followed directly after A Greek Slave.

In 1900 Sparling was in Little Nell and the Marchioness at the Herald Square Theatre.

== Later life ==
Sparling was Lord Framlingham in Lady Madcap at the Prince of Wales Theatre (1904); Mr Tobin in Noah's Ark at the Waldorf Theatre (1906); and the Duke of Tysmoke in Nelly Neil at the Aldwych Theatre (1907).

In July 1911 Sparling accompanied Marie George in a performance at Brighton Palace Pier, where:

Marie George gives the audience twenty minutes of sparkling fun, and makes them regret very much the powers that be which prevent her continuing her part for double that period. She is delightful in her songs, "That’s a Cinch", and "Over again". She is most ably assisted by Mr. Herbert Sparling, whose make-up as a pianoforte turner and acting throughout is wonderfully clever.

He was Marquis de Bouillaibaise in Baron Trenck at the Strand Theatre (1911); Percy Fitzwinney on tour in the musical comedy The Boy Scout (1912) with Marie George and C. Hayden Coffin, which he also directed; Dickie Bramsgrove in the musical The Officers' Mess at St Martin's Theatre (1918) and after at the Prince's Theatre (1919). On Broadway he was Harkins in The Half Moon (1920) at the Liberty Theatre.

In his later years he lived at 25 Portland Place in Brighton, Sussex, where he died in 1944 aged 80.
