= Wapping Old Stairs =

Comic opera with music by Howard Talbot

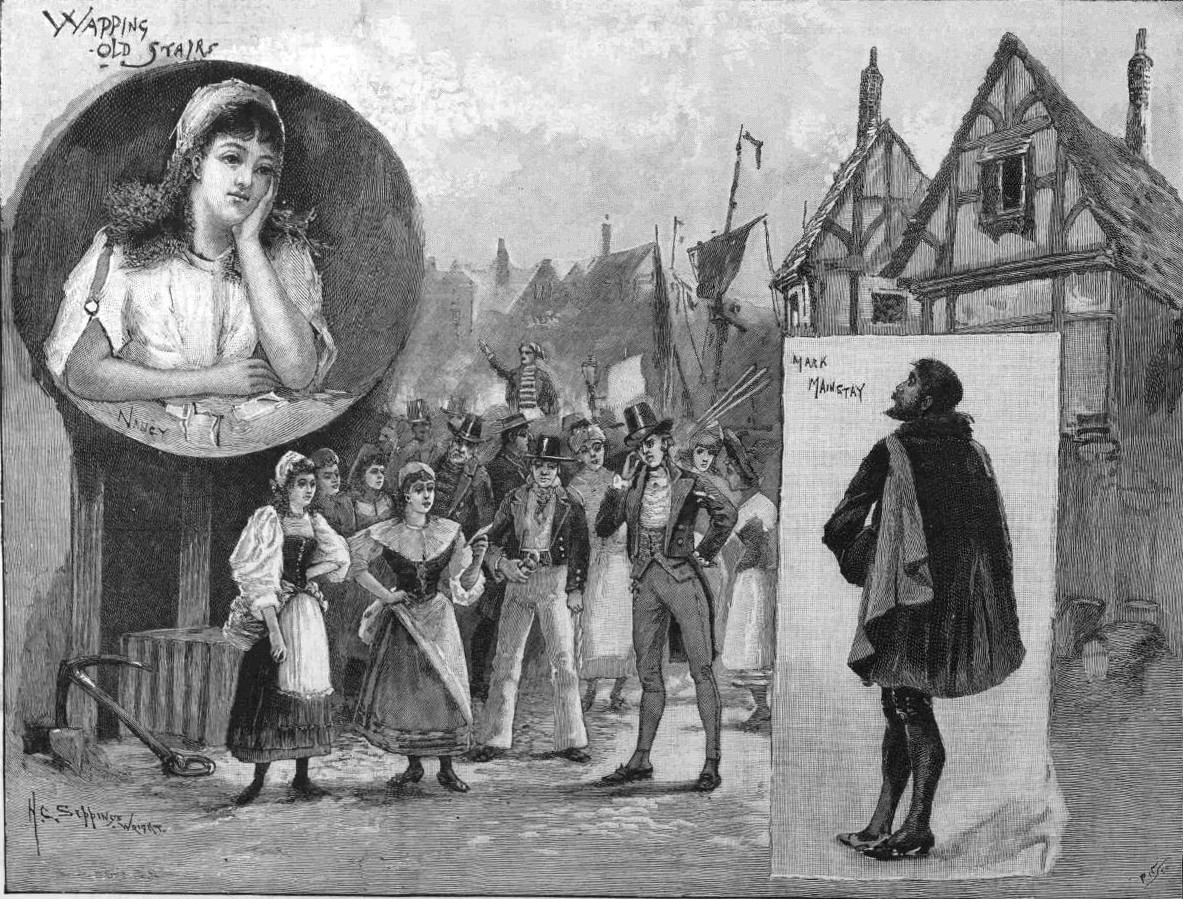
Scene from Wapping Old Stairs - The Illustrated London News (March 1894)

Wapping Old Stairs is an 1894 comic opera in three acts, with music by Howard Talbot, which played at the Vaudeville Theatre in London. It included D'Oyly Carte Opera Company regulars Courtice Pounds, Richard Temple and Jessie Bond in the cast.

== Production ==
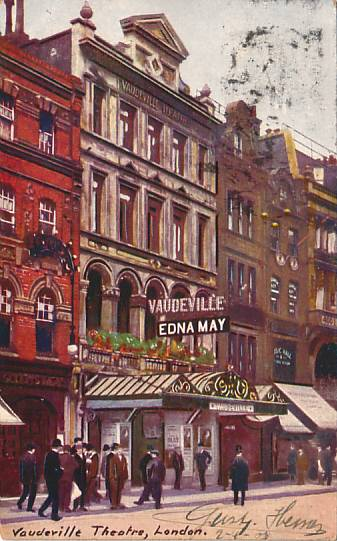
Postcard of the Vaudeville Theatre, c. 1905

Wapping Old Stairs had a lot of competition in London in 1894, which saw the openings of The Chieftain by Arthur Sullivan and F. C. Burnand, His Excellency by F. Osmond Carr and W. S. Gilbert, Go-Bang by Adrian Ross and Carr, The Lady Slavey by John Crook and George Dance, a revival of Little Jack Sheppard by Meyer Lutz and H. P. Stephens at the Gaiety Theatre, Mirette by André Messager and Ross, and The Shop Girl, an extremely successful musical comedy by H. J. W. Dam, Ivan Caryll, Lionel Monckton and Ross.

Written around the title of an old song, Wapping Old Stairs was first mounted at the Theatre Royal in King's Lynn from 4 to 6 January 1894 before transferring to the Vaudeville Theatre in London. It has a libretto by Stuart Robertson and a score by Howard Talbot and was Talbot's first full professionally produced comic opera; it was directed and produced by Richard Temple. The success of this production in King's Lynn, where the musical magazine The Lute commented, "there is a freshness and vivacity in Mr. Talbot's music – particularly in the opening numbers – that as a modern comic opera entitle the work to more than ordinary consideration" led to a transfer of the show to the Vaudeville Theatre in London; there it ran for 43 performances, from 17 February to 6 April 1894. Despite a strong London cast including Jessie Bond, Courtice Pounds and Richard Temple from the D'Oyly Carte Opera Company, the show was not well received in the West End, with the critic for The Times writing that the piece was an example "of the modified variety entertainment which is now in vogue" and which had "the complete absence of plot". In March 1894 various alterations were made to the piece to improve it, including introducing the ballad Wapping Old Stairs on which the work was based.

== Synopsis ==
A review in St James's Gazette said of the production:

“The author and composer of ‘Wapping Old Stairs’, the new opera or operetta produced at the Vaudeville on Saturday night, may be congratulated on having achieved a genuine musical and dramatic success. There is but little of the spectacular element in the piece; the same set scene does duty throughout, and almost the only dresses are those of sailors and of their constant associates, ‘the merry maids of Wapping’. The eminent musician in using for his score the old melody of ‘Wapping old Stairs’, which might have been treated with dramatic effect.

Mr Stuart Robertson’s book, with but little dramatic basis is ingeniously constructed, and his lyrics are written with grace and point. It appears that in the last century, or even earlier, two sailors of Wapping fell in love with the same girl; on which the most unscrupulous of the young woman’s admirers committed a murder, and so arranged matters that his rival was looked upon as the assassin and, to save his life, fled to foreign parts. But after the lapse of many years the truth came out; when the good man returned to the land of his birth and the girl of his heart, while the bad man was executed, and after ‘ suspension by the neck’ hung ignominiously in chains.

This story is, no doubt a little tragic for a comic opera, and the librettist, whilst softening its harsher features, has introduced in abundance the element of mirth.”

== Cast ==
- Sir Wormwood Scrubs - Herbert Sparling
- Mark Mainstay - Courtice Pounds
- Captain Crook - Henry Bourchier/Charles Collette
- Ben Brace - Avon Saxon
- Dick Fid - Richard Temple/T. P. Haynes
- Quartermaster - William Vokes
- Nancy Joy - Mary Turner
- Molly Joy - Hannah Jones
- Daisy Pennant - Mary Hutton
- Kate Capstan - M. Warren
- Betsy Binnacle - L. Stewart
- Susan Sinnett - Jessie Bond/Fanny Marriott
- Nellie Caper - Lennox
- Annie Alport - Amy Bell
- Bessie Bouncer - Fane
- Dolly Hawser - Annie Laurie
