= Talbotiella gentii =

Conservation status
- Critically Endangered (IUCN 3.1)

Scientific classification
- Kingdom: Plantae
- Clade: Tracheophytes
- Clade: Angiosperms
- Clade: Eudicots
- Clade: Rosids
- Order: Fabales
- Family: Fabaceae
- Genus: Talbotiella
- Species: T. gentii

Binomial name
- Talbotiella gentii Hutch. & Greenway

Species of legume

Talbotiella gentii is a medium-sized forest tree in the family Fabaceae. It is endemic to Ghana. It is threatened by habitat loss and is a species monitored by Ghana as a measure of environmental success in preserve biodiversity in forests.
