= Talbotiella eketensis =

Conservation status
- Endangered (IUCN 2.3)

Scientific classification
- Kingdom: Plantae
- Clade: Tracheophytes
- Clade: Angiosperms
- Clade: Eudicots
- Clade: Rosids
- Order: Fabales
- Family: Fabaceae
- Genus: Talbotiella
- Species: T. eketensis

Binomial name
- Talbotiella eketensis Baker f.

Species of legume

Talbotiella eketensis is a species of plant in the family Fabaceae. It is found only in Nigeria. It is threatened by habitat loss.
