= Jennie McNulty =

British actress (1866–1927)

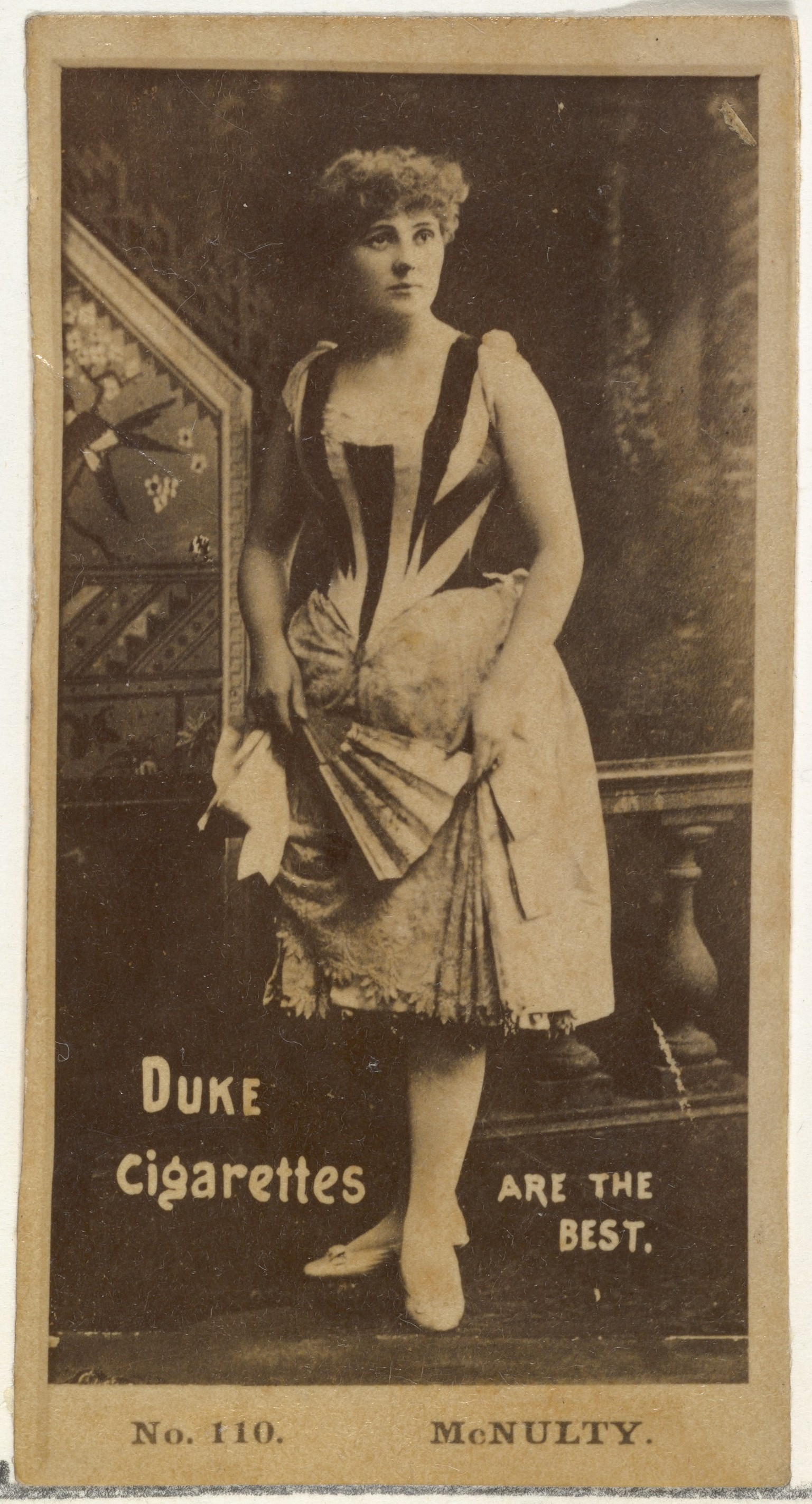
Jennie McNulty, from the Actors and Actresses series (N145-6) issued by Duke Sons & Co.

Jennie McNulty or Jenny McNulty (1866 – 1927) was an American-born British actress. Beginning her career as a Gaiety Girl, she went on to act in featured roles on the London stage in musical theatre around the close of the 19th century, including comic operas and operettas, Victorian burlesques, farces and Edwardian musical comedies.

== Career ==
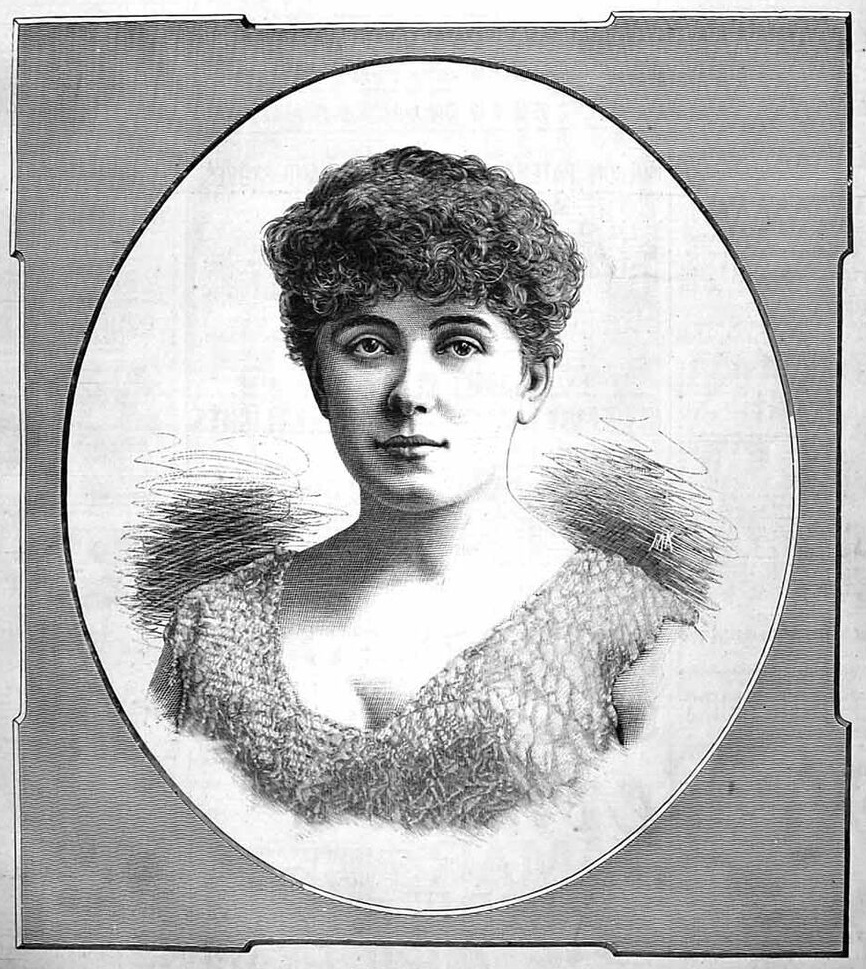
McNulty on a magazine cover, 1887

McNulty was born in Boston, Massachusetts, and began her career as a Gaiety Girl. She was later remembered as "among the prettiest and most popular of the girls at the Gaiety." Her West End roles included Lady Pattie in Adonis (1886), Fernand in Monte Cristo Jr. (1886), Lady Betty in the comic opera Dorothy (1886), a small role in the Victorian burlesque Frankenstein, or The Vampire's Victim (1887), Siebel in another burlesque, Faust up to date (1888–1889), Letty Lansdell in First Mate (1888–1889), Una Foxwood in The Gold Mine; or, the Miller of Grenoble (1890), and Polly in The Bookmaker by J. W. Pigott (1890). Cecil Howard wrote in The Theatre that her performance as Polly was "as good ... as one could wish ... her bravado, her insolent vulgarity, were only equalled by the little exquisite touch of pathos towards the close". She played Mrs. Huntley in Sweet Nancy (1890) and Corisande in Ivan Caryll's version of Ma mie Rosette (1892).

McNulty in Ma Mie Rosette

In 1893–1894, she played the phony "Comtesse de la Blague" in Morocco Bound, in which role she was called "bright and engaging". In 1894 she was Flo Honeydew in The Lady Slavey and in the same year married William Victor Paulet. In 1895, she was elected as head of the Choristers' Association in London. In 1898, she appeared in A Greek Slave. and the following year she received good notices as Martha in My "Soldier" Boy. In 1903, she played Lady Flareup in the farce Dumb-bell Daisy. After this, she continued to perform in London and on tour with other George Edwardes companies.

She died in London in 1927, aged 60.

== Sources ==
- Adams, William Davenport. A Dictionary of the Drama: A guide to the plays, playwrights, players, and playhouses, Ghatto & windus (1904)
- Brereton, Austin. Dramatic Notes - an illustrated year book of the stage, Vol. 8, London: Carson and Comerford (1887)
- Capes, Bernard and Charles Eglington (eds.) The Theater: A Monthly Review and Magazine, Wyman & Sons (1890)
- Scott, Clement (ed.) The Theater: A Monthly Review and Magazine, Vol. XIII, London: Strand Publishing (1889–1890)
- Davis, Tracy C. Actresses as Working Women: Their Social Identity in Victorian Culture, Routledge (2002) ISBN 1134934475
