= Arthur Harry Cross =

Arthur Harry Cross A.R.C.O.
- Born: 1858; King's Lynn
- Died: 29 August 1906
- Burial place: Sandringham Churchyard
- Education: Choirboy at Jesus College Cambridge
- Occupation: Sandringham Organist 1878-1906
- Spouse: Alice Serjeant
- Children: 6

Arthur Harry Cross was a chorister, organist, choirmaster and composer of sacred and secular music, who was appointed organist and choirmaster at St Mary Magdalene Church, Sandringham in 1878 at the age of 20. He continued in that position for 28 years until his death of heart disease in 1906.

== Early life ==
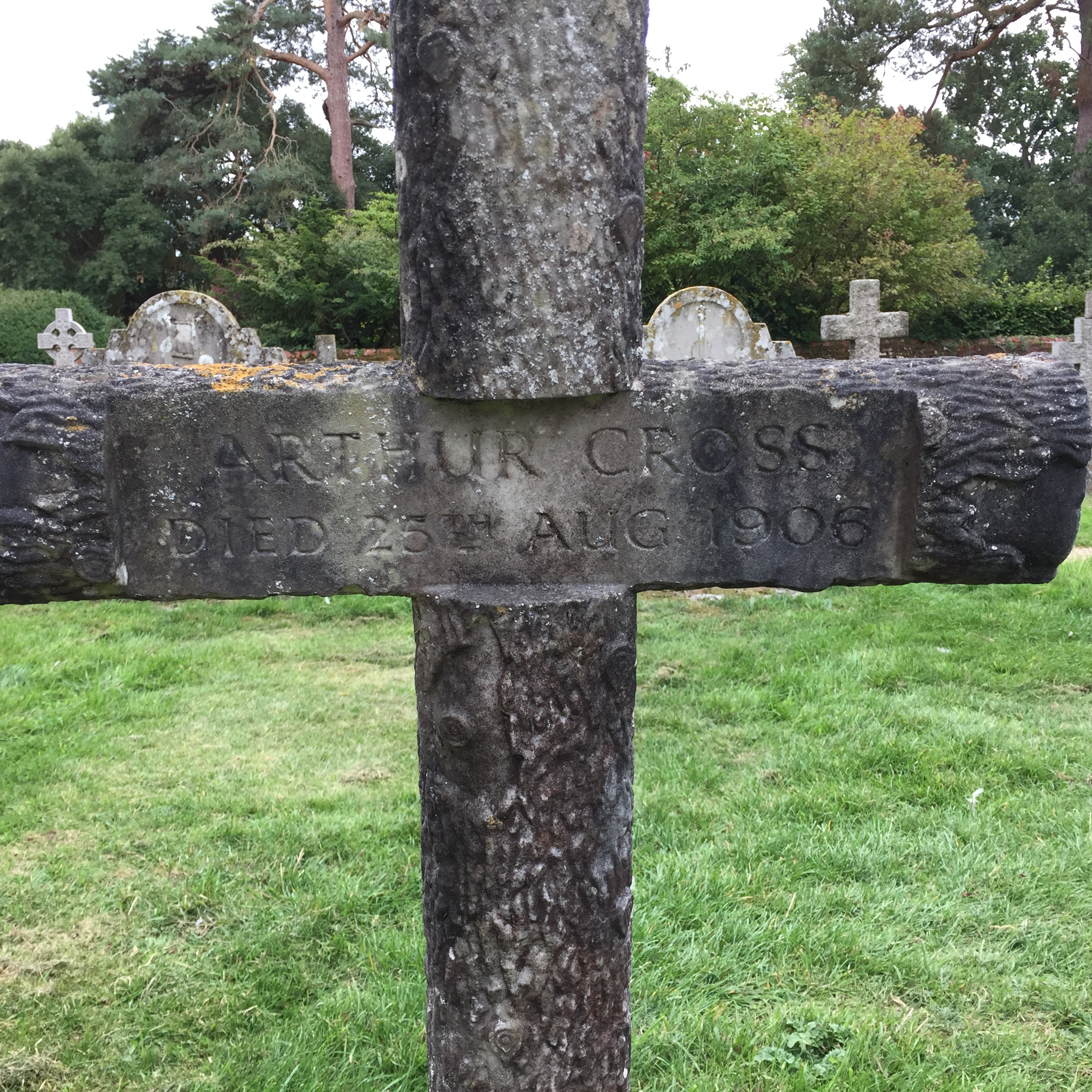
Gravestone of Arthur H Cross, Organist at Sandringham 1878-1906

Arthur Cross, whose father was a cook, was a choirboy at Jesus College, Cambridge, where he also studied the piano and organ. Cross travelled around the country as a solo singer. By 17 years old he held a church appointment, and deputised at several college chapels.

He became an Associate of the Royal College of Organists (A.C.R.O) in 1878.

== Musical career ==
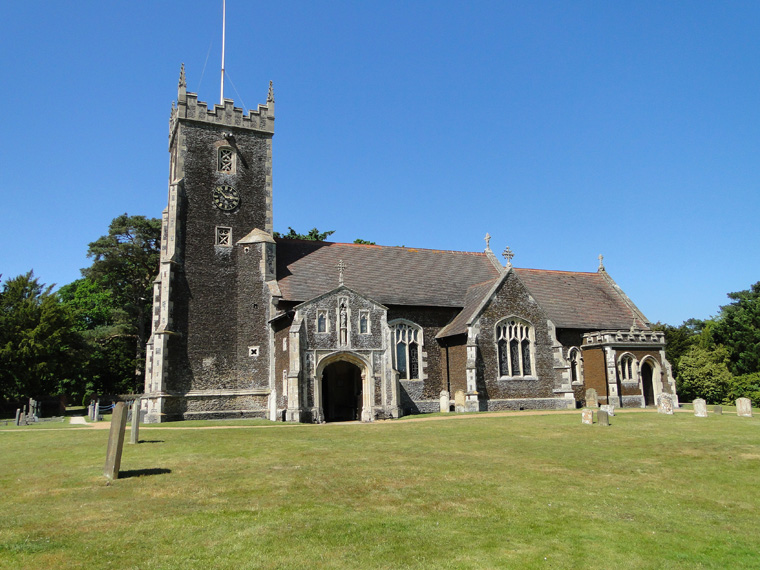
St Mary Magdalene Church, Sandringham

Cross was appointed organist and choirmaster at St Mary Magdalene Church, Sandringham, by the Prince of Wales in 1878 and subsequently moved to Dersingham, Norfolk.

Cross was also the honorary conductor of the King's Lynn Musical Society, the Hunstanton Amateur Operatic Society and the Hunstanton Choral Society. He also worked with the Heacham Choral Societies and the King's Lynn Music Society. He was conductor at the Hunstanton Amateur Dramatic Society's performance of Patience by Gilbert and Sullivan and acted in their performance of the Henry Arthur Jones comedy The Manoeuvres of Jane. He was musical director of the King's Lynn and Hunstanton Amateur Operatic Society's production of Iolanthe in 1904. He conducted and sang the tenor parts in a performance of Messiah for the Kings Lynn Musical Society, in 1903, and sang the tenor part in May Queen A Pastoral at the Guildhall, Cambridge in 1904.

He sang, played the piano, acted and/or composed the music at many local events, some of which were in aid of charity.

In 1888 an Anglican Chant book called "The Sandringham Chant Book" was published. This was produced by Cross and the Rector of Sandringham, Rev. F. A. J. Harvey, and was designed to be used by village choirs where the Tonic sol-fa system was taught. A number of composers contributed to the chants, including Cross.

== Family ==
In 1910, the first daughter of Arthur and Alice, Dorothy Maud, married the conductor and composer Howard Talbot.

== Death and burial ==
On his death, at the age of 48, Cross's wife received a message of condolence from Queen Alexandra: "Too grieved to hear of your overwhelming loss and sorrow which will be shared by all who know your dear husband. May God support and comfort you and your poor children." -- Alexandra.

Cross was buried in the churchyard of Sandringham Church, where friends and a number of people known in the musical circles of Norfolk and Cambridgeshire came to pay their respects. King Edward VII and Queen Alexandra were represented at the funeral by Mr. & Mrs. Frank Beck, the King's agent at Sandringham, and in addition to telegraphing messages of sympathy to the family the King and Queen ordered some floral tokens to be placed on the coffin.
