= Talbotiella =

Scientific classification
- Kingdom: Plantae
- Clade: Embryophytes
- Clade: Tracheophytes
- Clade: Spermatophytes
- Clade: Angiosperms
- Clade: Eudicots
- Clade: Rosids
- Order: Fabales
- Family: Fabaceae
- Subfamily: Detarioideae
- Tribe: Amherstieae
- Genus: Talbotiella; Baker f. (1914)

Species
- 10; see text

Genus of legumes

Talbotiella is a genus of flowering plants in the family Fabaceae. It includes 10 species native to west-central and west tropical Africa. Most species ranges from Ghana to the Republic of the Congo. Five are endemic to Cameroon. T. cheekii is endemic to Guinea.

Most are trees growing 6 to 35 meters tall. Some form stilt roots to anchor themselves in wet soil. T. eketensis is a shrub. They grow in coastal and freshwater swamp forest and seasonally-dry forest, often on sandy soil, and on rocky hills.

Species:

- Talbotiella bakossiensis Cheek
- Talbotiella batesii Baker f.
- Talbotiella breteleri (Aubrév.) Mackinder & Wieringa
- Talbotiella cheekii Burgt
- Talbotiella couteronii Sonké, M.Simo & Burgt
- Talbotiella ebo Mackinder & Wieringa
- Talbotiella eketensis Baker f.
- Talbotiella gentii Hutch. & Greenway
- Talbotiella korupensis Mackinder & Wieringa
- Talbotiella velutina Burgt & Wieringa
