= Howard Talbot =

British composer and conductor (1865–1928)

Talbot in 1905

Howard Munkittrick, better known as Howard Talbot (9 March 1865 – 12 September 1928), was an American-born, English-raised composer and conductor of Irish descent. He was best known for writing the music to several hit Edwardian musical comedies, including A Chinese Honeymoon, The Arcadians and The Boy, as well as a number of other successful British musicals during the first two decades of the 20th century.

== Life and career ==
Of Irish descent, Talbot was born in America in Yonkers, New York, but moved to London at the age of four. His parents were Alexander Munkittrick (1810–1892) and his wife, Margaret. Originally planning to enter the medical profession, he studied at King's College London but switched to music and pursued a musical education at the Royal College of Music. There he studied under Sir Hubert Parry, Sir Frederick Bridge and Sir Walter Parratt. For some years, although Talbot had had works staged by amateurs in Hunstanton, Oxford and King's Lynn, professionally he only succeeded in having a few of his individual songs performed in other people's productions. After a marriage which ended in divorce, he was married in 1910 to Dorothy Maud Cross, the daughter of St Mary Magdalene Church, Sandringham organist Arthur Harry Cross. The couple produced four daughters.

=== 1890s: early career ===
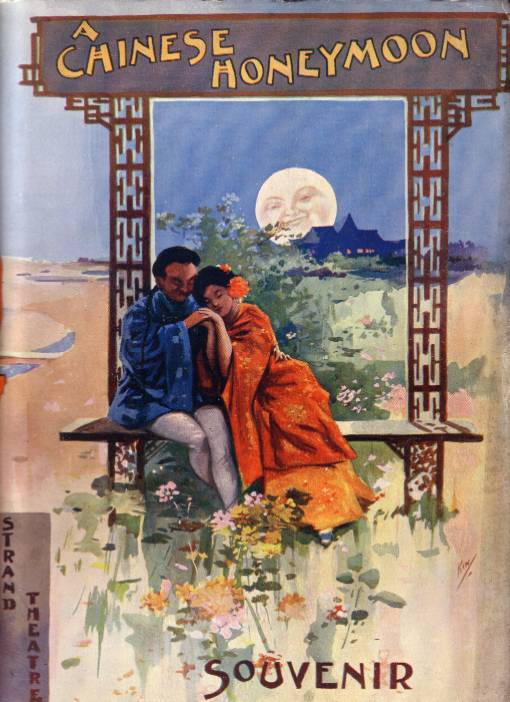
2nd Anniversary Souvenir of A Chinese Honeymoon

Talbot's first full professionally produced comic opera was Wapping Old Stairs in 1894. The success of this production in King's Lynn led to a transfer of the show to the Vaudeville Theatre in London. Despite a strong London cast including Jessie Bond, Courtice Pounds and Richard Temple from the D'Oyly Carte Opera Company, the show was not well received in the West End and closed after one month. A follow-up work, the burlesque All My Eye-van-hoe, was also a flop, and Talbot was forced to sue the producers for monies owed to him for this work.

At this time, Talbot earned the bulk of his living from conducting both in London and for provincial touring productions, such as The Lady Slavey, where managers appreciated his "cheery, goodnatured" attitude. Although he continued to compose, achieving some success both in Britain and America with Monte Carlo in 1896, Talbot's name was not yet considered to be a major force in British musical theatre, and he continued to be asked mainly to supply individual songs that were inserted into works primarily written by others. The most successful shows that he conducted in London during this period were The Sorrows of Satan (1897) at the Shaftesbury Theatre and two Arthur Roberts vehicles, Dandy Dan the Lifeguardsman (1897), which included his song "Someone Ought to Speak to Millie Simpson", and Milord Sir Smith (1898). In 1899 he conducted Great Caesar.

Talbot's first blockbuster hit was A Chinese Honeymoon, which opened in Hanley in 1899 and toured extensively before it was finally presented in London in 1901. A Chinese Honeymoon went on to become the first work of musical theatre in history to run for over 1,000 consecutive performances and found large audiences around the world. Talbot continued to conduct at the Gaiety Theatre, Daly's Theatre and other West End theatres and went on to compose or collaborate on two dozen musicals. He commanded a technical proficiency rare among Edwardian musical theatre composers, and his music is reminiscent of Arthur Sullivan's. In addition to musicals, he produced a body of songs, piano pieces, orchestral works and a cantata.

=== 20th century ===
Many of Talbot's shows in the first decade of the new century were successes that had international tours, including Kitty Grey (1901, to which he contributed songs including "Mademoiselle Pirouette"), The Girl from Kays (1902, contributing some songs), Three Little Maids (1903, contributing the concerted music and some lyrics), The Blue Moon (1904), The White Chrysanthemum (1905), The Girl Behind the Counter (1906), and The Belle of Brittany (1908). In addition, he contributed a few songs to other musicals and composed a few unsuccessful musicals.

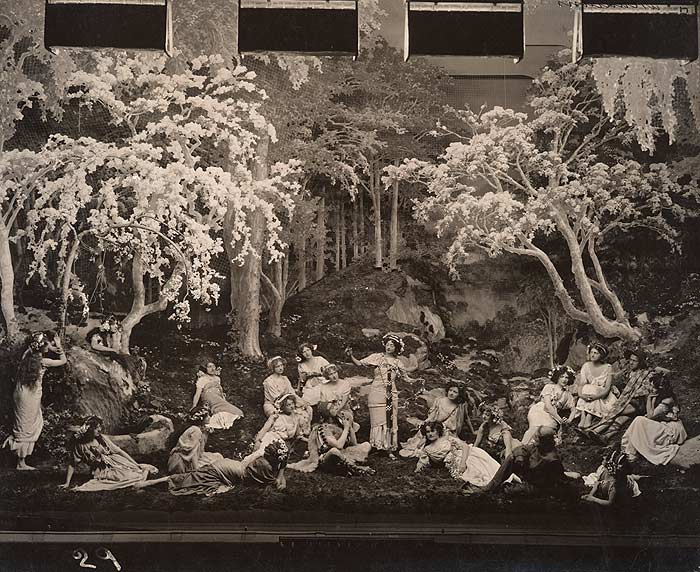
Scene from The Arcadians, 1909

In 1909, Talbot teamed up with Lionel Monckton to produce The Arcadians, which went on to become one of the most successful Edwardian musical comedies and has been described as the masterpiece of the genre. The musicals that followed this, such as The Mousmé in 1911, The Pearl Girl in 1913, My Lady Frayle in 1915, Mr Manhattan in 1916, and other short works for music halls, were only modest successes, however, and musical styles began to change. In 1916 Talbot contributed to a reworking of an American musical, High Jinks for the Adelphi Theatre, which adapted a Rudolf Friml score. At the same time, he had been composing music for short musical pieces for variety theatres.

The careers of other major composers of the Edwardian era (for example, Sidney Jones), began to fade by World War I when they failed to adopt the new American dance rhythms and styles, such as ragtime. However, in 1917, Talbot and Monckton were hired to write the score for the musical The Boy, based on Pinero's The Magistrate, a vehicle for American comedian Bill Berry, who had been the star of High Jinks. The Boy became one of the biggest hits of the wartime era, when audiences sought light, escapist musical comedy. It was also adapted successfully on Broadway as Good Morning, Judge in 1919 and toured the English-speaking world. This was followed by another successful musical for Berry by Fred Thompson based on a Pinero play, composed with Ivor Novello, Who's Hooper? (1919). A third Pinero adaptation, My Niece's (1921), was a flop and proved to be Talbot's final West End theatre score.

After retiring to the south of England, Talbot was ill with bronchial trouble for several years before his death. Nevertheless, he continued to compose musicals for the amateur companies with whom he had worked early in his career. He also wrote the successful march "All Hail Our King". Talbot died at his home at Reigate, England, at the age of 63. His nephew, Howard Carr, was also a theatre conductor and composer, and at one stage he directed and conducted performances of A Chinese Honeymoon in London.
