= A Chinese Honeymoon =

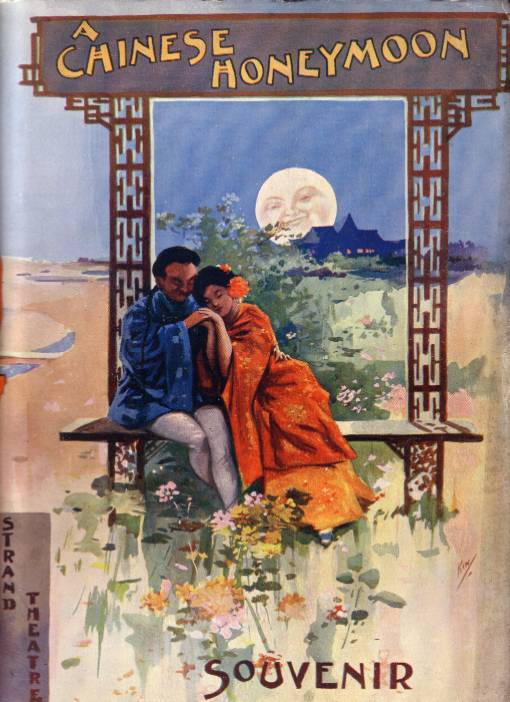
- 2nd Anniversary Souvenir Program
- Music: Howard Talbot; Ivan Caryll; Others
- Lyrics: Harry Greenbank; Others
- Book: George Dance
- Productions: 1899 West End; 1902 Broadway

The duty of the bridesmaids is to blow shrill whistles whenever the groom is seen flirting.

Elsie joined the cast in 1903.

A Chinese Honeymoon is a musical comedy in two acts by George Dance, with music by Howard Talbot and additional music by Ivan Caryll and others, and additional lyrics by Harry Greenbank and others. One song that originated in the show was "Mister Dooley" which became famously associated with The Wizard of Oz for decades, when John Slavin, in the title role, interpolated the song for much of the first year of its run.

The piece opened at the Theatre Royal in Hanley, England on 16 October 1899 and then toured extensively. After that, it played at the Royal Strand Theatre in London, managed by Frank Curzon, opening on 5 October 1901 for an astonishing run of 1,075 performances. It also played at the Casino Theatre, in New York, opening on 2 June 1902 for a run of 376 performances. In London, Lily Elsie took over the role of Princess Soo-Soo from Beatrice Edwards in early 1903 and was in turn succeeded by Kate Cutler. It also starred Louie Freear, and Arthur Williams took over the role of Mr. Pineapple.

A Chinese Honeymoon was the first musical to run for 1,000 performances. The story concerns couples who honeymoon in China and inadvertently break the kissing laws (reminiscent of The Mikado).

== Roles and original cast ==
- Hang Chow (Emperor of Ylang Ylang) – Picton Roxborough
- Chippee Chop (Lord Chancellor) – E. Boyd-Jones
- Hi Lung (Lord High Admiral) – Percy Clifton
- Tom Hatherton – Leslie Stiles (later Farren Soutar)
- Mr Pineapple – Lionel Rignold
- Florrie, Violet, Millie and Gertie (bridesmaids to Mrs P) – Fay Wentworth, Blanche Thorpe, Rosie Edwardes and Florence Burdett
- Mrs Brown (official mother-in-law) – M. A. Victor
- Yen Yen and Sing Sing (maids of honour to Soo Soo) – Jessica Lait and Fanny Wright
- Mi Mi (a waitress) – Madge Temple
- Soo Soo (the Emperor's niece) – Beatrice Edwards
- Mrs Pineapple – Marie Dainton
- Fi Fi (waitress at the hotel)– Louie Freear

== Synopsis ==
The Emperor seeks a bride who will marry him "for himself alone," so he despatches an English skipper, who has been promoted to the post of Lord High Admiral of the Chinese fleet, in search of such a woman. But the conditions are rather hard, for the high position of the Emperor is withheld, and the unlucky admiral has to pretend that he represents a billposter. The admiral returns from his quest without success. As a lingering death is the penalty of his failure it need hardly be said that he resorts to all sorts of expedients to avert the punishment. Some comical effects are obtained by making the abnormally tall Emperor think that he is betrothed to a diminutive "slavey" [a maid-of-all-work]. To these ingredients add a cockney tradesman married to a jealous wife who insists upon her four bridesmaids travelling with her for detective and protective purposes, a pair of young lovers, and quaint (even if imaginary) Chinese customs.

== Musical numbers ==
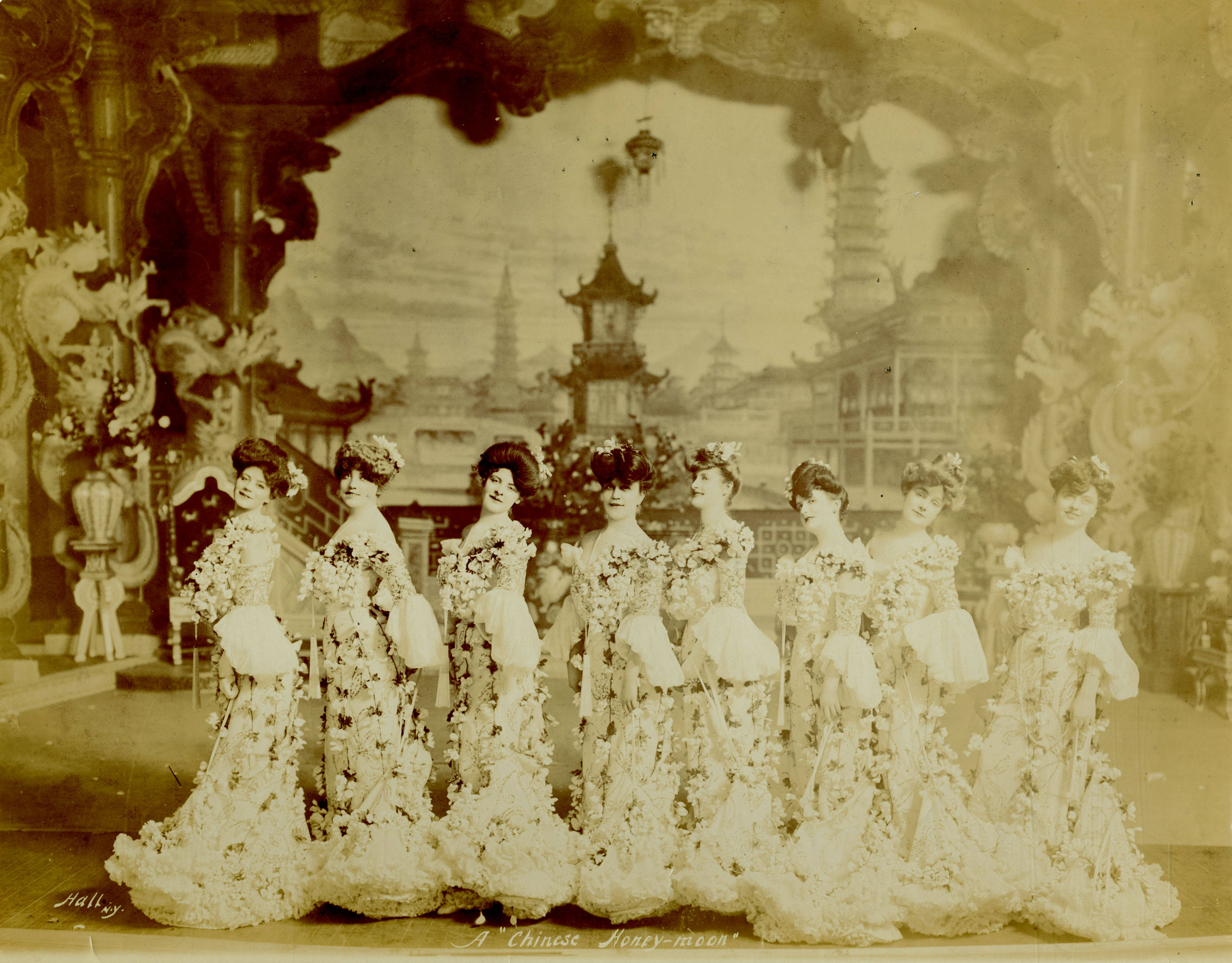
A scene from A Chinese Honeymoon

Act I – The Gardens of the Hotel at Ylang Ylang.

- No. 1 – Opening Chorus – "In Ylang Ylang where the ruby river rolls its billows"
- No. 1a – Chorus Exit – "It's Roly Poly, Roly Poly, o'er the sea once more"
- No. 2 – Song – Soo-Soo & Chorus – "In the days of the ancient long ago in a quaint little Chinese town"
- No. 3 – Chorus – Entry of the Emperor, and Song – "Hail, hail, hail all hail!"
- No. 3a – Reprise for Exit – "And this is the hand that seeks a mate"
- No. 4 – Sextette – Mr. & Mrs. Pineapple & Bridesmaids – "Three months ago we stepp'd aboard a great big ocean ship"
- No. 5 – Song – Mrs. Pineapple & Chorus – "The à la girl is an English girl with lots of à la ways"
- No. 6 – Nursery Rhymes Sextette – Tom, Fi Fi, Hi Lung, Mrs. Brown, Yen Yen and Mr. Pine – "Sing a song of sixpence"
- No. 7 – Song – Fi Fi & Chorus – "I'm awfully partial to music, so I bought a piano one day"
- No. 8 – Finale Act I – "Gather, gather, man and maiden come with bridal blessings laden"

Act II – Room in the Emperor's Palace.

- No. 9 – Opening Chorus – "With weary hearts we wait about, the bride to greet"
- No. 10 – Song – Fi Fi & Chorus – "Some people sigh for beauty and some yearn for this and that"
- No. 11 – Song – Soo Soo & Chorus – "Dolly was a baby just as others may be, with a pair of eyes of blue"
- No. 12 – Song – Mr. Pineapple – "I dreamed a dream the other night, I thought that I had flown..."
- No. 13 – Octette – Emperor, Yen, Tom, Soo Soo, Mr. & Mrs. Pineapple, Fi Fi & Hi Lung – "There's nothing like a little pat"
- No. 14 – Chorus – "Welcome, official mother-in-law, let the cymbals clang"
- No. 15 – Duet – Soo Soo & Tom – "Along the way where lovers go the roses red are twining"
- No. 16 – Duet – Hi Lung & Mrs. Pineapple ("Marie") – "We'll give some little tit-bits from the plays"
- No. 17 – Duet – Emperor & Fi Fi – "Now once there was a Mandarin, who for a sweetheart yearn'd"
- No. 18 – Song – Fi Fi & Chorus – "You no doubt heard of the happy home where music is ador'd"
- No. 19 – Finale Act II – "For he is the bridegroom and she is the bride"

Supplementary items

- No. 20 – Sestet – Hang Chow, Mi Mi, Hi Lung, Yen Yen, Chippee, & Fi Fi – "The force of good example is a power beyond dispute"
- No. 21 – Song – "Maidee of Ohio" – "I'se a coloured lady and I've just come up to town"
- No. 22 – Song & Chorus (singer unspecified) – "While passing through the busy streets of busy London town"
- No. 23 – Cake Walk and Two-Step
