= Faust up to Date =

Victorian burlesque by G. R. Sims and Henry Pettitt with music by Meyer Lutz

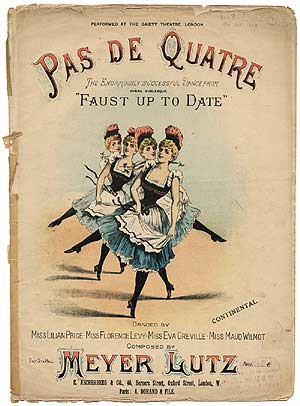
- Sheet music
- Music: Meyer Lutz
- Lyrics: G. R. Sims; Henry Pettitt
- Book: G. R. Sims; Henry Pettitt
- Productions: 1888 West End

Faust up to Date is a musical burlesque with a libretto was written by G. R. Sims and Henry Pettitt, and a score written by Meyer Lutz (a few songs by others were interpolated into the show). Set in Nuremberg, it is a spoof of Gounod's opera, Faust, which had first been performed in London in 1864. The burlesque followed on from an earlier Lutz musical, Mephistopheles, or Faust and Marguerite.

The piece was first performed at the Gaiety Theatre, London on 30 October 1888, produced by George Edwardes, and ran until August 1889. It starred Florence St. John as Margaret, E. J. Lonnen as Mephistopheles and Mabel Love as Totchen. It was revived in July 1892, with Florence St. John again playing the role of Margaret, Edmund Payne as Mephistopheles and Arthur Williams as Valentine. The piece enjoyed subsequent productions in New York, Australia (with Robert Courtneidge as Valentine) and elsewhere.

== Background ==
This type of burlesque, or travesty was popular in Britain at the time. Other examples include The Bohemian G-yurl and the Unapproachable Pole (1877), Blue Beard (1882), Ariel (1883, by F. C. Burnand), Galatea, or Pygmalion Reversed (1883), Little Jack Sheppard (1885), Monte Cristo Jr. (1886), Miss Esmeralda (1887), Frankenstein, or The Vampire's Victim (1887), Mazeppa, Ruy Blas and the Blase Roue (1888), Carmen up to Data (1890), Cinder Ellen up too Late (1891) and Don Juan (1892, with lyrics by Adrian Ross).

John Hollingshead had managed the Gaiety Theatre, London, from 1868 to 1886 as a venue for variety, continental operetta, light comedy, and numerous musical burlesques composed or arranged by the theatre's music director, Wilhelm Meyer Lutz. Hollingshead called himself a "licensed dealer in legs, short skirts, French adaptations, Shakespeare, taste and musical glasses." In 1886, Hollingshead ceded the management of the theatre to George Edwardes, whom he had hired in 1885. Edwardes expanded the burlesque format from often one-act to full-length pieces, with original music by Lutz instead of scores compiled from popular tunes, and choreography by the theatre's dance-master, John D'Auban. Lutz's ballet music, a Pas de Quatre (1888), originally choreographed by D'Auban, became very popular and is still available today on CD.

Nellie Farren starred as the "principal boy" at the Gaiety for nearly 25 years, from 1868 to 1892. Fred Leslie joined her there in 1885 and wrote many of its most successful burlesques under his pseudonym, "A. C. Torr". In the early 1890s, as Burlesque went out of fashion, Edwardes changed the focus of the theatre from musical burlesque to the new genre of Edwardian musical comedy.

== Productions ==
Faust up to date was first produced at the Gaiety Theatre, London by George Edwardes, opening on 30 October 1888, and running until August 1889. It starred Florence St. John as Margaret, E. J. Lonnen as Mephistopheles, Fanny Robina as Faust, George Stone as Valentine, and Mabel Love as Totchen. A highlight of the piece was a dance for four women. It was revived in July 1892, with Florence St. John again playing the role of Margaret, Edmund Payne as Mephistopheles and Arthur Williams as Valentine. The piece enjoyed subsequent productions in New York opening at the former Broadway Theatre at 1445 Broadway on 10 December 1889, Australia (with Robert Courtneidge as Valentine) and elsewhere.

=== Roles and original cast ===
Florence St. John and Fanny Robina in the original production

- Mephistopheles – E. J. Lonnen
- Valentine – George Stone
- Old Faust – Harry Parker
- Lord Chancellor – Walter Lonnen
- Faust – Fanny Robina
- Siebel – Jennie McNulty
- Wagner – Emma Broughton
- Donner – Alice Young
- Blitzen – Hetty Hamer
- Elsa – Lillian Price
- Lisa – Florence Levey
- Katrina – Miss Greville
- Hilda – Miss Sprague
- Totchen – Mabel Love
- Martha – Maria Jones
- Waitress – Emily Robina
- Waitress – Minnie Ross
- Marguerite – Florence St. John

== Synopsis ==
The following plot summary was printed in The Theatre in December 1888:

It might have been thought that Goethe's legend was too hackneyed a subject to afford scope for a new version; but Messrs. Sims and Pettitt have contrived to introduce into it fresh elements of fun, without so far departing from the original story as to make it unrecognisable. We have Old Faust longing for love and youth, and the appearance of Mephistopheles, who summons a vision of Marguerite, engaged as a fascinating barmaid at the Italian Exhibition at Nuremberg. Old Faust signs the necessary bond and is transformed into a gay and handsome gallant, who is accepted by Marguerite. Her brother, Valentine, to favour the addresses of Siebel, makes his sister a ward in Chancery, and the married pair dread the punishment of the Lord Chancellor, from which punishment they eventually escape at the Olympic Gardens, Nuremberg, by ascending in a balloon. Mephistopheles is outwitted by the reappearance of Old Faust, with the grievance that the gentleman in red has not fulfilled his portion of the contract, but allowed another to enjoy himself in his place. Valentine, though he has been carried off as killed, comes to life again, his valuable existence having been saved by Faust's sword being turned aside by Valentine's Waterbury watch, the touching gift of his sister!

== Critical reception ==
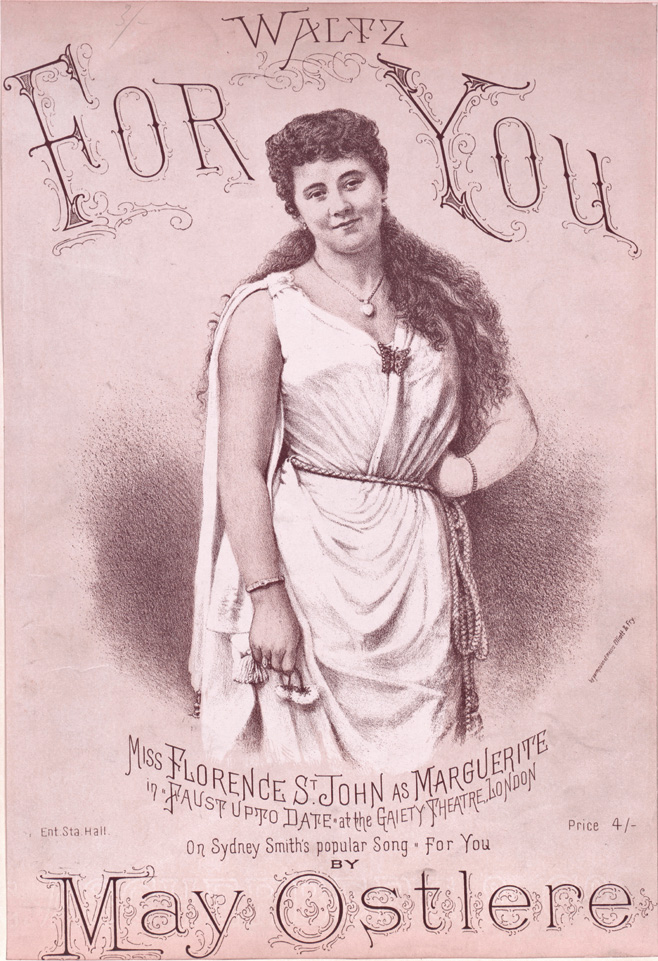
Sheet music for a piano arrangement of one of Marguerite's songs

The critic of The Theatre wrote, "The music, written by Herr Lutz, is appropriate and tuneful, and the book very amusing. The authors have been guilty of some atrocious puns. … The topical allusions are quite up to date and the lyrics smooth. An excellent Mephistopheles is found in Mr. E. J. Lonnen, who plays with immense spirit, and gains a nightly encore for his songs, "I shall have 'em by-and-by", and "Enniscorthy" (written for him by R. Martin). Miss Florence St. John is an ideal burlesque actress, so skilfully does she blend the innocence of the real Marguerite with the faster proclivities of her modern prototype. On the opening night it was noticed with regret that full advantage had not been taken of the exquisite voice Miss St. John possesses; but since then, in addition to the numbers, "A simple little maid", and "Fond heart, oh, tell me why," two other ballads have been added, and it need hardly be said that all are charmingly sung. ... As usual, Mr. George Edwardes has spared no expense in the production, to which Mr. Charles Harris has contributed his accustomed skill, and Faust up to Date will certainly fill the Gaiety for many a night to come." The Morning Post called the piece a great success, and particularly singled out "a sort of grotesque petticoat quadrille, danced by four danseuses, and encored uproariously.

Referring to the absence of Nellie Farren, the theatre's usual "principal boy", and Fred Leslie, its usual star comedian, who were in America, The Era commented, "There is no disguising the fact that the absence of the principal members of the Gaiety troupe is appreciably felt"; the paper expressed reservations about the piece and some of the cast, but acknowledged that the Gaiety audience had shown great enthusiasm for the piece and the players. The New York Times, reviewing the New York production, the next year, had much the same reaction, disliking the "silly" piece even more and praising only the dance for the four women and the singing of Marguerite, who was St. John's understudy. In particular, it found Lonnen to be a poor substitute for Leslie in every respect.
