= Galatea, or Pygmalion Reversed =

Victorian burlesque by Meyer Lutz, Henry Pottinger Stephens and W. Webster

Punch cartoon of Edward Terry as Pygmalion

Galatea, or Pygmalion Re-Versed is a musical burlesque that parodies the Pygmalion legend, and specifically W. S. Gilbert's 1871 play Pygmalion and Galatea. The libretto was written by Henry Pottinger Stephens and W. Webster. The score was composed by Wilhelm Meyer Lutz.

The work premiered at the Gaiety Theatre, London on 26 December 1883, closing on 30 January 1884 after 37 performances. It starred Nellie Farren and Edward Terry.

== Background ==
This type of work, Victorian burlesque, was popular in Britain in the late 19th century. Other examples include The Bohemian G-yurl and the Unapproachable Pole (1877), Blue Beard (1882), Ariel (1883, by F. C. Burnand), Little Jack Sheppard (1885), Monte Cristo Jr. (1886), Miss Esmeralda (1887), Frankenstein, or The Vampire's Victim (1887), Faust up to Date (1888), Ruy Blas and the Blasé Roué (1888), Carmen up to Data (1890), and Cinder Ellen up too Late (1891). Gilbert himself had written a series of burlesques of opera early in his career, including Robert the Devil (1868), which was the Gaiety's first burlesque.

John Hollingshead had managed the Gaiety Theatre from 1868 to 1886 as a venue for variety, continental operetta, light comedy, and numerous musical burlesques arranged by the theatre's music director, Wilhelm Meyer Lutz. Hollingshead called himself a "licensed dealer in legs, short skirts, French adaptations, Shakespeare, taste and musical glasses." In 1886, Hollingshead ceded the management of the theatre to George Edwardes, whom he had hired in 1885. Nellie Farren, as the theatre's "principal boy", and Fred Leslie starred at the Gaiety for over 20 years. In the early 1890s, as burlesque went out of fashion, Edwardes changed the focus of the theatre from musical burlesque to the new genre of Edwardian musical comedy.

Galatea or Pygmalion Re-Versed is a parody of W.S. Gilbert's blank verse romantic play Pygmalion and Galatea. The Morning Post described the piece as "A short burlesque of Mr. Gilbert's classic drama in which Miss Mary Anderson is now delighting the public at the Lyceum." It was the second item in a double bill with the three-act comedy The Rocket by Arthur Wing Pinero. Songs arranged or composed for the piece by Meyer Lutz included "The Masher King" (Pygmalion), "The Bashful Maiden" (Myrine) and "The Modern Swell" (Galatea).

== Synopsis ==
The plot turns on its head the plot of Gilbert's Pygmalion and Galatea, which involves a married sculptor who falls in love with his statue, Galatea. The following synopsis of Galatea, or Pygmalion Reversed was printed in The Era:

The title will perhaps suggest that in this instance Galatea is the sculptor and Pygmalion the statue – the ideal man endowed with life and able to toddle, though a very earnest appeal to the "gods" perched up aloft in the gallery. The living statue is very angular in movement, and its face is not exactly handsome; but Pygmalion with his first breath becomes filled up with vanity. He exclaims with rapture, "How beautiful I am!" and given a hand-mirror he seems never tired of gazing upon his own loveliness, and of breaking forth into ecstatic song with, "Just look at that and look at this." Pygmalion is a classical masher. He "mashes" not only Galatea who made him, but Myrine and Daphne, who, bewitched by his manly beauty, give the "cold shoulder" to their respective and respectable husbands, Cyniscos, Leucippe and Chrysos, who, being thereby enraged, resolve not to mash, but to smash Pygmalion and to begin by chipping him. This treatment of course soon inclines Pygmalion to return to his old position, and then peace and happiness are restored.

== Roles and original cast ==
- Galatea – Nellie Farren
- Myrine – Miss C. Gilchrist
- Daphne – Maud Taylor
- Pygmalion – Edward Terry
- Cyniscos – W. Elton
- Chrysos – E. J. Henley
- Leucippe – Phyllis Broughton
- Mimos – Miss E. Broughton
- Agesimos – Miss M. Watson
- Pyrrha, Chloe, Myrrha, Lesbia, Alpha, Beta, Gamma and Delta – Misses M. Ross, P. Watson, Handley, Dupré, B. Matiste, P. Matiste, Chester and Overington

== Critical reception ==
The Era was not impressed, calling the piece, "A very tame affair. Mr Stephens seems to have had a funny idea, but has not funnily put it into shape." Other papers took a more favourable view. The Morning Post called it "this amusing burlesque". The Standard thought that although the plot "lacks both interest and variety", Edward Terry was "convulsively funny" as Pygmalion. Lloyd's Weekly Newspaper wrote, "The burlesque is not remarkable for its jokes, though they are plentiful. It affords opportunity for a good laugh and is a capital skit on the original."
