= The Bohemian G-yurl and the Unapproachable Pole =

Victorian burlesque by Meyer Lutz and Henry James Byron

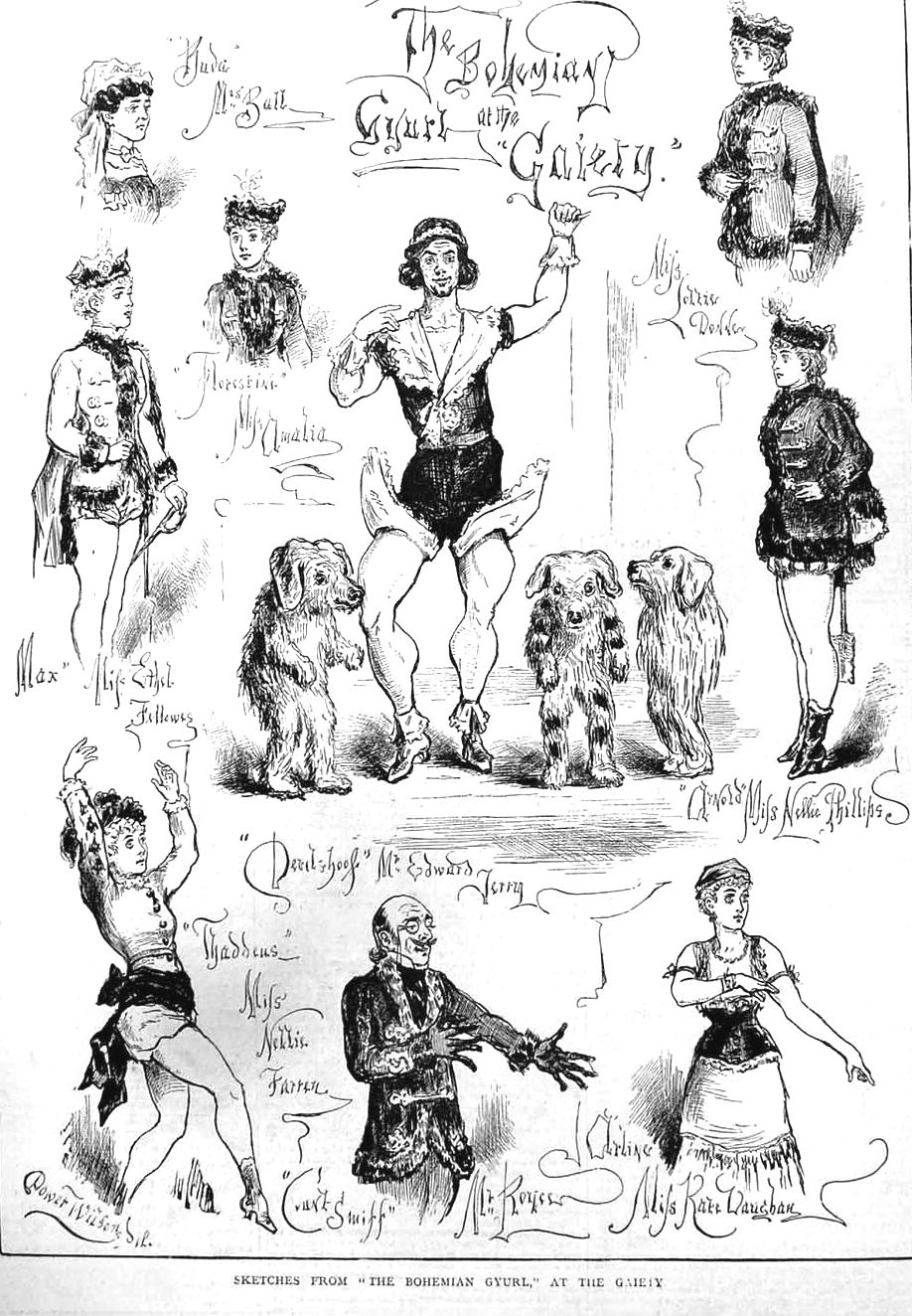
Characters from The Bohemian G-yurl, Illustrated Sporting and Dramatic News, 1877

The Bohemian G-yurl and the Unapproachable Pole is a musical burlesque in two acts, with a score by Meyer Lutz to a libretto by Henry James Byron, which played under the management of John Hollingshead at the Gaiety Theatre in London in 1877. It was a parody of the popular opera The Bohemian Girl composed by Michael William Balfe with a libretto by Alfred Bunn.

== Background ==
Burlesque of opera or classical works was popular in Britain from the 1860s to the 1880s, and The Bohemian G-yurl and the Unapproachable Pole fell into this tradition. Other examples at the Gaiety included Blue Beard (1882), Ariel (1883, by F. C. Burnand), Galatea, or Pygmalion Reversed (1883), Little Jack Sheppard (1885), Monte Cristo Jr. (1886), Miss Esmeralda (1887), Frankenstein, or The Vampire's Victim (1887), Mazeppa, Faust up to Date (1888), Ruy Blas and the Blasé Roué (1888), Carmen up to Data (1890), Cinder Ellen up too Late (1891) and Don Juan (1892, with lyrics by Adrian Ross).

This burlesque opened at the Opera Comique in London on 31 January 1877 before transferring to the Gaiety Theatre, running for a total of 117 performances. John Hollingshead managed the Gaiety from 1868 to 1886 as a venue for variety, continental operetta, light comedy, and numerous musical burlesques composed or arranged by the theatre's music director, Meyer Lutz. Hollingshead called himself a "licensed dealer in legs, short skirts, French adaptations, Shakespeare, taste and musical glasses." Nellie Farren, as the theatre's "principal boy", starred at the Gaiety for over 20 years, and both Edward O'Connor Terry and Kate Vaughan were regulars.

The piece had a revival at the Gaiety in May 1884 with Farren and Terry reprising their roles as Thaddeus and Devilshoof.

== Critical reception ==
A review of the production at the Opera Comique in Vanity Fair for March 1877 stated:

Even if you happen not to have seen the Bohemian G-yurl, you will surely have heard by this time a great deal of the humour of Mr. Terry and the dancing of Mr. Royce in this production. You therefore proceed to the Opera Comique, and having duly admired the Polish costumes and done your best to catch the words of the songs, you wait patiently until hard on the eleventh hour, and wonder when all this tremendous merriment so generally spoken of is going to begin. The drollery of Mr. Terry may not perhaps strike you as so very remarkable after all – that is to say, for Mr. Terry; you will laugh at his scene with the performing dogs if you chance not to have seen something very similar before in many previous burlesques, but that is about the extent of the fun which even Mr. Terry can extract from his part. Mr. Royce dances with his usual buoyancy, and twirls as he is wont to twirl, but still you are not happy. You may, perhaps, think that some little of the humour accredited wholesale to Mr. Terry lurks in the round, astonished eyes, and is to be found in the playful ways of Miss Nelly Farren, and that Miss Kate Vaughan, with her pliant figure and resplendent attire, is responsible for much of the attractive power of Mr. Royce's very popular dancing; but still you will remember the purpose for which language has been said to have been given, and, when your club friends go night after night to see The Bohemian G-yurl, and expatiate glowingly on the delicious humour of Mr. Terry and the marvellous dancing of Mr. Royce, you will doubtless be able to read aright, with one eye closed even, the veiled and vicarious homage.

However, the critic of Judy was rather more appreciative, writing:

The Bohemian G-yurl, at the Opera Comique, is certainly as funny a thing as I have seen. Terry and Royce made me roar again, and with the aid of Misses Farren, Vaughan and West, they give you one of the liveliest evenings imaginable. If you want to laugh, go and see Byron's last burlesque.

== Roles ==
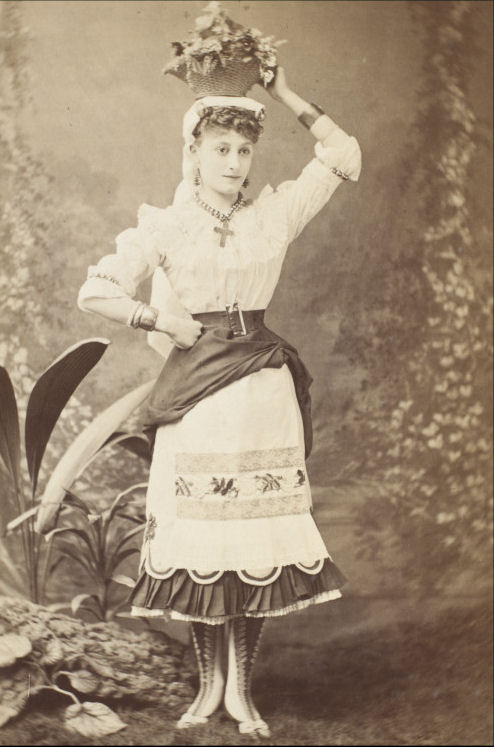
Kate Vaughan as Arline in The Bohemian G-yurl at the Gaiety Theatre (1877)

- Thaddeus – Nellie Farren
- Devilshoof – Edward O'Connor Terry
- Arline – Kate Vaughan
- Buda, Arline's nurse – Mrs Ball
- Arnold – Nellie Phillips
- Florestine – Miss Amalia
- Max – Ethel Fellowes
- Count Arnheim – E. W. Royce

== Musical Numbers ==
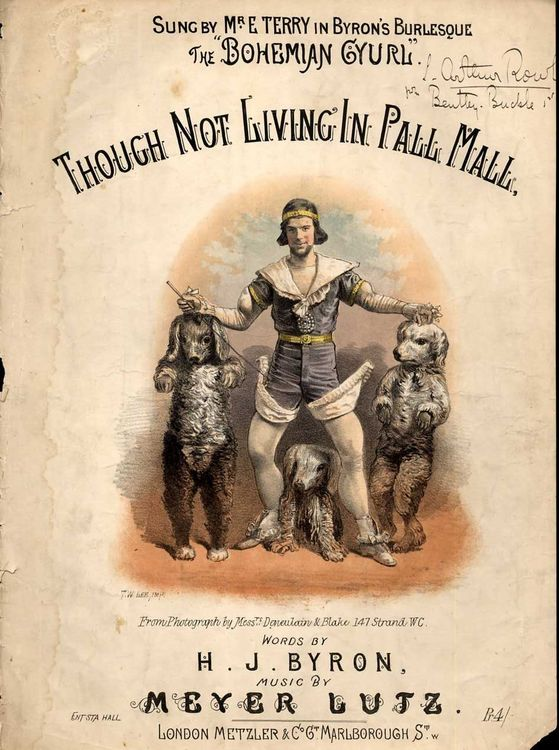
Sheet music cover for 'Though Not Living in Pall Mall' - sung by Edward Terry

=== Act I ===
Scene I: Alpine Landscape and Chateau of Count Arnheim

- Chorus of Count's Retainers: 'Loud the Horn is Sounding'
- Song and Chorus: 'More like her Dad every day' – Count Arnheim, etc.
- Song: 'Did you ever Catch a Weasel asleep?' – Devilshoof
- Song and Chorus: 'What d'ye really take us for?' – Thaddeus, Devilshoof, etc.
- Song and Chorus: 'She'll be perfection's pink' – Thaddeus, Devilshoof, Count, etc.

Scene II: Interior of the Gypsy Queen's Tent

- Tyrolean Air: 'As I wonder o'er the mountain' – Arline
- Song: 'It mayn't be yet' – Thaddeus
- Duett: 'Riding in the Moonlight' – Arline and Thaddeus
- Gypsy Chorus: 'Hurrah! Hurrah! Hurrrah!' – Zingari
- Octette and Chorus: 'Excelsior' – Zingari
- Gypsy Wedding Song: Chorus and Bell Accompaniment
- Gypsy Morris Dance – Ensemble

=== Act II ===
Scene I: Interior of the Gypsy Queen's Tent

- Grand Chorus of Gypsys
- Song: 'I Wonder What Next They will do' – Devilshoof
- Serio-Comic Quartette: 'You Wish to Recover your Child'
- Selection – Arline, Characters and Chorus

Scene II: Reception Chamber of Arnheim Chateau

- Song: 'She's All Jam' – Devilshoof
- Song: 'The Song of the Whippoorwill' – Arline
- Grand finale – Company

Between the scenes the orchestra played selections from Balfe's The Bohemian Girl.
