= Cinder Ellen up too Late =

Victorian burlesque by Fred Leslie

Fred Leslie as the servant in Cinder Ellen up too Late

Cinder Ellen up too Late is a musical burlesque written by Frederick Hobson Leslie (writing under the pseudonym A. C. Torr) and W. T. Vincent, with music arranged by Meyer Lutz from compositions by Lionel Monckton, Sidney Jones, Walter Slaughter, Osmond Carr, Scott Gatti, Jacobi, Robertson, and Leopold Wenzel. Additional lyrics were written by Basil Hood. The show was a burlesque of the well-known pantomime and fairy tale, Cinderella.

The piece was first produced in Melbourne, Australia at the Princess's Theatre on 22 August 1891 and then in Sydney, on 5 October at the Theatre Royal. It then debuted in London at the Gaiety Theatre in London and ran from 24 December 1891 until 9 July 1892, a total of 181 performances. It was revised and revived later in 1892. The production was directed by Walter Raynham, with choreography by Katti Lanner and Willie Warde and costumes by Wilhelm. Nellie Farren created the title role in Australia; in London the part was played by Kate James and then Letty Lind. The piece was re-written during the run; some characters were dropped and new ones were introduced. The cast included Sylvia Grey as Linconzina and Florence Levey as Fettalana (the stepsisters), E. J. Lonnen as Prince Belgravia, Arthur Williams as Sir Ludgate Hill, and Fred Leslie as "a servant". Adelaide Astor had the small role of Templina and later the larger one of Fettalana, and Topsy Sinden danced in the piece. Lottie Collins sang her sensationally popular song, "Ta-ra-ra Boom-de-ay" as an interpolation in the show every evening.

The title was a "playful allusion" to the real first name, Ellen, of the Gaiety's famous star, Nellie Farren. After the company's return from Australia, and before the opening of Cinder Ellen in London, Farren experienced an attack of rheumatic fever which aggravated her spinal disease. She had to withdraw from the London production of Cinder Ellen. Her illness progressively crippled her, and Farren rarely performed after this. Farren's withdrawal left Kate James to open in the title role in London.

== Background ==
This type of burlesque was popular in Britain at the time. Other examples include The Bohemian G-yurl and the Unapproachable Pole (1877), Blue Beard (1882), Ariel (1883, by F. C. Burnand), Galatea, or Pygmalion Reversed (1883), Little Jack Sheppard (1885), Monte Cristo Jr. (1886), Miss Esmeralda (1887), Frankenstein, or The Vampire's Victim (1887), Mazeppa, Faust up to Date (1888), Ruy Blas and the Blasé Roué (1888), Carmen up to Data (1891) and Don Juan (1892, with lyrics by Adrian Ross).

John Hollingshead had managed the Gaiety Theatre from 1868 to 1886 as a venue for variety, continental operetta, light comedy, and numerous musical burlesques composed or arranged by the theatre's music director, Wilhelm Meyer Lutz. Hollingshead called himself a "licensed dealer in legs, short skirts, French adaptations, Shakespeare, taste and musical glasses." In 1886, Hollingshead ceded the management of the theatre to George Edwardes, whom he had hired in 1885. Edwardes expanded the burlesque format from mostly one-act to full-length pieces, generally with original music by Lutz instead of scores compiled from popular tunes. Nellie Farren starred as the "principal boy" at the Gaiety for over 20 years. She was joined in 1885 by Fred Leslie, who played comic characters and wrote many of its pieces under his pseudonym, "A. C. Torr". In the early 1890s, as Burlesque went out of fashion, Edwardes changed the focus of the theatre from musical burlesque to the new genre of Edwardian musical comedy.

=== Characters and casts ===
The following list shows the names of the 1891 London cast, followed by the names of the 1892 cast:

Sylvia Grey as Linconzina

- Cinder-Ellen – Kate James; Letty Lind
- Linconzina – Sylvia Grey; Katie Seymour
- Fettalana – Florence Levey; Adelaide Astor
- Mrs. Kensington Gore – Emily Miller; Miss Holmes
- Lord Taplow – Maud Hodson; Florence Lloyd
- Lord Eastbourne – Blanche Massey; Ethel Earle
- Lord Soho – Hetty Hamer; Louie Pounds
- Mrs. Bayswater – Miss Kate Welwyn (1892 only)
- Sir Peterborough Court – Violet Durkin; Maud Boyd
- Lord Whitefriars – Miss Dunville; Miss Farrington (called Lord Blackfriars in 1892)
- Sir Waterloo Bridge – Miss Norton; Lily Harold
- Catherina – Lilian Price
- Grazina – Maud Wilmot; Alice Gilbert
- Furnivalzina – Violet Monckton
- Griffina – Eva Greville; Bob Robina
- Templina – Adelaide Astor; Miss Maud
- Victorina – Lily McIntyre; Topsy Sinden
- Pages (1892 only) – Phoebe Carlo and Lilian Sedgewick
- Prince Belgravia – E. J. Lonnen; Maggie Duggan
- Sir Ludgate Hill – Arthur Williams; Charles Danby
- Lord Leatherhead (1892 only) – Fred Storey
- Charles Hollywell (1892 only) – Arthur Playfair
- Peckham – Mr. Harris; Mr. Barry
- Gnorwood – Mr. Walker; E. D. Wardes
- Footman – Mr. Hill (both productions)
- A Servant – Fred Leslie (both productions)
