= Henry Beauchamp =

Henry Beauchamp may refer to:

- Henry Pottinger Stephens (1851–1903), known as Henry Beauchamp, English dramatist and journalist
- Henry Beauchamp, Duke of Warwick (1425–1445), English nobleman
