= E. J. Lonnen =

English actor, comedian and singer

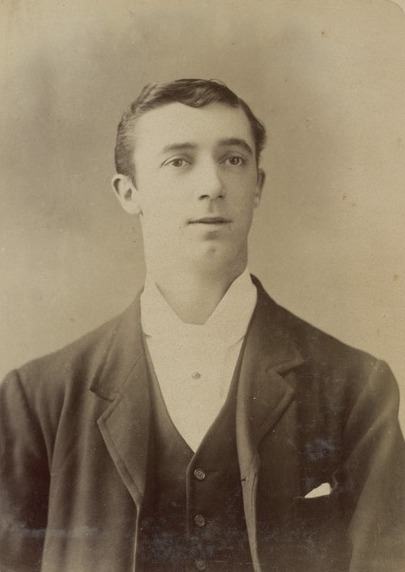
E. J. Lonnen, c. 1892

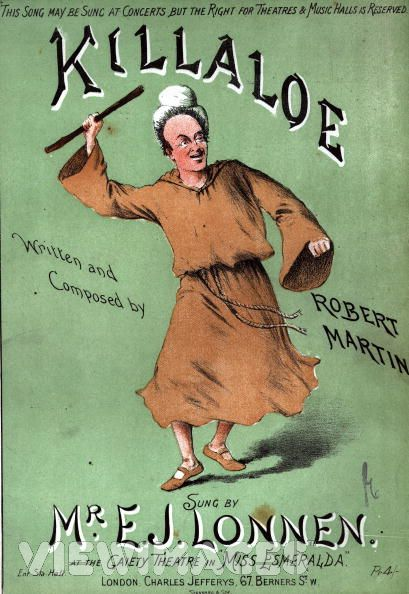
Lonnen's signature tune, "Killaloe"

Lonnen in Frankenstein

Edwin Jesse Lonnen (1860 – 31 October 1901), credited as "E. J." or "Teddy", was an English actor, comedian and singer known for his performances in musical burlesques, operettas and musical comedies, particularly at the Gaiety Theatre, London at the end of the Victorian era.

Lonnen began acting as a child in pantomime and other theatre in the British provinces. He made his London debut in 1885 and appeared in several of the famous Gaiety burlesques from 1887 to 1891. He starred in such other major works as Little Christopher Columbus (1893), Baron Golosh (1895) and The Messenger Boy (1900) before dying at the age of 41.

== Biography ==
Lonnen was born in Kingston upon Hull, Yorkshire into a theatrical family. His father William Rooles Lonnen (1833–1890) was an actor-manager, well known in the provinces under his stage name, Champion. His brother Victor was an orchestra conductor under the name Victor Champion. Lonnen appeared in his father's productions from an early age. "I have a distinct recollection of playing a speaking part in a pantomime when I was five years old. I have been the baby in East Lynne; Prince Arthur – in fact I have played the whole round of juvenile parts." As a teenager, Lonnen acted for Harry Wright's "booth" company of travelling players, and shortly before he was 20, he was engaged to appear with Barry Sullivan, and then with Edward Terry playing Tootles in Weak Woman and the Dougal Creature in Robbing Roy. He made a hit in a Liverpool pantomime with Frank Emery, who engaged him for his burlesque company for a provincial tour that brought him to wider attention.

Lonnen made his London debut as Tancred in Falka at the Avenue Theatre in 1885 and subsequently starred in a series of successful musical burlesques at the Gaiety Theatre in London, including Monte Cristo Jr. as De Villefort and Ballyhooly (1886), Miss Esmeralda as Frollo (1887, in which he sang Killaloe, perhaps his most popular song), Frankenstein, or The Vampire's Victim (1887), Faust up to date as Mephistopheles (1888), Carmen up to Data as José (1890) and Cinder Ellen up too Late as Prince Belgravia (1891). In 1892–1893 Lonnen toured with the London Gaiety Burlesque Company to Melbourne and Sydney, Australia. Later, back in England, he starred in another burlesque hit, Little Christopher Columbus, as O'hoolegan (1893 at the Lyric Theatre), in the title role of the operetta Baron Golosh (1895 at the Trafalgar Theatre), and in La Béarnaise as Girafo (1896 at the Prince of Wales's Theatre). He also starred in the musical comedy hit The Messenger Boy as Cosmos Bey (1900 at the Gaiety).

Lonnen married Emily Inman, a dancer. They had a daughter, actress Jessie Lonnen, who performed with George Edwardes's company in England and the J. C. Williamson company in Australia. His son, Lieut. Edwin John Leslie Lonnen, a pilot with the RFC, was killed in action in World War I on 16 August 1916 at the age of 27. Lonnen died of tuberculosis at the Sanatorium, Hailey, Ipsden at the age of 41. He is buried at the Norwood Cemetery.
