= Frank Thornton (Savoyard) =

English actor, singer and producer (1845–1918)

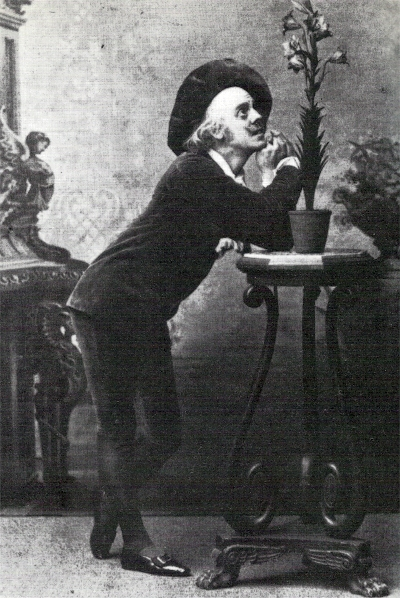
Frank Thornton as Major Murgatroyd in Patience

Frank Thornton (1845 – 18 December 1918) was an English actor, singer, comedian and producer. Despite a successful stage career in comedies in London, on tour and abroad, Thornton is probably best remembered as the understudy to George Grossmith in a series of Gilbert and Sullivan operas from 1877 to 1884.

Thornton began his stage career giving drawing-room entertainments while simultaneously working in a commercial office in London, keeping his theatrical activities secret from his office employers for four years. He was engaged by Richard D'Oyly Carte as understudy to George Grossmith in the Gilbert and Sullivan operas, also playing roles in some of the curtain raisers played with the operas. In 1881, he created a small principal role in Patience and resigned from his office post. In 1883, he played the Lord Chancellor in a tour of Iolanthe.

Thornton left the D'Oyly Carte Opera Company in 1884 and began a long series of tours of Australia in stage comedies, notably The Private Secretary, interspersed with appearances in burlesques, farces and other plays on the London stage and on tour. He rejoined D'Oyly Carte in the 1890s in London and on tour, and later returned to touring Australia in comedies including Charley's Aunt.

== Life and career ==
Thornton started his career giving drawing-room entertainments in the London area, while working during the day at a merchant's office. Originally unpaid, as his entertainments gained popularity he was able to earn "a modest but useful guinea" and, as a manager, to recruit other entertainers, including George Grossmith and Richard Temple.

Thornton first appeared on stage as the Foreman in a production of Trial by Jury in 1877. In the same year, he was invited to audition for Richard D'Oyly Carte's forthcoming production of The Sorcerer at the Opera Comique and was considered for the leading role of John Wellington Wells, but Grossmith was preferred, and Thornton was offered the position of understudy.

=== D'Oyly Carte years ===
In the production of The Sorcerer he appeared as "the oldest inhabitant" of the village of Ploverleigh. For the first run of H.M.S. Pinafore (1878), he understudied both Grossmith (as Sir Joseph Porter) and Temple (as Dick Deadeye). When Grossmith's father suffered a fatal collapse, Thornton took over in mid-performance to allow his colleague to go to his father. He played Sir Joseph and Deadeye at other times during the run. He had roles in short companion pieces, Cups and Saucers, After All!, and In the Sulks. During the run of the next Gilbert and Sullivan opera, The Pirates of Penzance, Thornton understudied, and occasionally played, the principal roles of General Stanley and Samuel. During these four years, he continued to keep his office job, contriving to keep his managers there ignorant of his theatrical work: "A coat or hat conspicuously displayed often served to encourage the belief that he was 'somewhere about' the great warehouse when, in fact, he had rushed away to the Opera Comique for a rehearsal."

In 1881, Thornton created the small principal role of Major Murgatroyd in the new Gilbert and Sullivan opera Patience. He at last felt able to resign his office job, where he felt his prospects were limited. He also occasionally deputised for Grossmith as Bunthorne and took a role for a time in the curtain raiser Uncle Samuel. In 1882, he realised an ambition to act in a strong serious dramatic role. For Florence Terry's farewell performance, a revival of W. S. Gilbert's play Broken Hearts was billed. A strong cast was chosen, including Terry's sister Marion Terry, May Fortescue and Julia Gwynne, but the two actors who had previously played the role of the misanthropic dwarf Mousta were unavailable. Thornton asked to play the part. "What, Major Murgatroyd?" said Gilbert, thinking the idea preposterous, but he gave Thornton a chance and was impressed. Thornton again appeared in Broken Hearts at his own benefit performance at the Savoy Theatre in February 1883. The theatrical newspaper The Era wrote, "Mr Frank Thornton's usual line of characters could hardly have prepared the audience for the strength and passion he infused into the part of Mousta." At the benefit, among other items, Grossmith premiered his musical sketch, The Drama on Crutches.

Thornton continued as Grossmith's understudy as the Lord Chancellor in the next Savoy opera, Iolanthe, but when the production went on tour in 1883, Thornton was given the role, also serving as stage manager for the touring company. In 1884 Carte sent him to New York to supervise the first American production of Princess Ida. The theatrical newspaper, The Era, reported, "The complete and effective manner in which Princess Ida has been put on the stage at the Fifth-avenue Theatre, New York, is due to the taste, experience and indefatigable labours of Mr Frank Thornton of the Savoy, who was sent out by Mr Carte especially to superintend the production."

=== Overseas tours and West End shows ===
In 1884 Thornton was engaged by the holder of the American production rights to the farce The Private Secretary to produce the piece and play the part of the Rev Robert Spalding in New York. The production ran until April 1885, after which Thornton briefly returned to London. He played Spalding in the London production for a week, to give the regular performer, W. S. Penley, a brief holiday during its long West End run, and then sailed for Sydney, having secured the Australasian production rights to The Private Secretary. His tour of over 16,000 miles through Australia and New Zealand with the play "proved the greatest success ever scored in the Antipodes". During his first visit to Australia, he also appeared as the Lord Chancellor in Iolanthe and as John Wellington Wells in the first Australian production of The Sorcerer in 1886 and as the Learned Judge in Trial.

Thornton played Lurcher in Alfred Cellier's Dorothy on tour both in Britain and Australia. His performance was described by the critic of The Western Mail as "quaint and excruciatingly funny; a thing to be seen and remembered." He then returned to the London stage, playing Quasimodo in a "melodramatic burlesque" of Victor Hugo, Miss Esmeralda, with fellow Savoyard Marion Hood at the Gaiety Theatre. He received good notices for this production, but was less well reviewed in his next role, as an amateur detective in the farce A Mare's Nest, of which The Era wrote, "he made it rather grim and repulsive than humorous." He was judged back on form in a double bill of farce, Lot 49, and the burlesque Frankenstein, or The Vampire's Victim, at the Gaiety in January 1888, with Nellie Farren and Sybil Grey.

In September 1888 he assembled a company and sailed once again to Australia, with a repertory of four comedies, Mamma by Sydney Grundy, Bonny Boy, Sweet Lavender by Arthur Wing Pinero, and The Private Secretary. Mamma provoked protest in the pages of The Sydney Morning Herald, which "considered the play too naughty for Antipodean audiences, and said so very plainly." Thornton invited a Supreme Court judge to attend and say if the criticism was fair, and the judge pronounced in his favour.

=== Return to D'Oyly Carte and later years ===
Thornton returned to England in September 1890, and in June 1891 he created the role of Pyjama, the Grand Vizier, in The Nautch Girl for D'Oyly Carte. After this closed, he toured with the company in The Vicar of Bray, leaving the company again in 1892. In London, he appeared in La Rosière in 1893 and later in that year he began his third tour of Australia, with Charley's Aunt and, again, The Private Secretary. On his return to London he appeared in G. Stuart Ogilvie's romantic drama, The Sin of Saint Hulda, with Lewis Waller. In 1897–98 he made a further tour of Australia with the play, The Strange Adventures of Miss Brown.

In 1899 he starred in a farce, Facing the Music, with Lionel Brough, and later took the play on tour in the UK. While playing in Belfast in 1900, he collapsed on stage and was forced to take a break from the production. He made another trip to Australia in 1902, having secured the rights to the play The Test match by Gerald FitzGibbon and Fred Bowyer.

Thornton died in 1918 at the age of 73.
