= Ruy Blas and the Blasé Roué =

Victorian burlesque by Fred Leslie and Herbert F. Clark with music by Meyer Lutz

Souvenir programme

Ruy Blas and the Blasé Roué is a burlesque written by A. C. Torr (pen name of Fred Leslie) and Herbert F. Clark with music by Meyer Lutz. It is based on the Victor Hugo drama Ruy Blas. The piece was produced by George Edwardes. As with many of the Gaiety burlesques, the title is a pun.

After a tryout in Birmingham beginning on 3 September 1889, Ruy Blas and the Blasé Roué opened in London on 21 September 1889 at the Gaiety Theatre and ran for 289 performances. The cast included Nellie Farren, Fred Leslie, Marion Hood, Letty Lind, Sylvia Grey, Linda Verner, Blanche Massie, Alice Young, Charles Danby, Fred Storey and Ben Nathan. The piece toured in the British provinces and internationally, and was revised at least once during its run. It originally included a caricature of Henry Irving, in a scene in which some of the actors wore ballet girl costumes. Irving, never having seen the show, objected, and the Lord Chamberlain (Britain's theatrical censor, who also had not seen the show) prohibited the caricature.

== Background ==
This type of burlesque, or "travesty", was popular in Britain during the Victorian era. Other examples include The Bohemian G-yurl and the Unapproachable Pole (1877), Blue Beard (1882), Ariel (1883, by F. C. Burnand), Galatea, or Pygmalion Reversed (1883), Little Jack Sheppard (1885), Monte Cristo Jr. (1886), Miss Esmeralda (1887), Frankenstein, or The Vampire's Victim (1887), Mazeppa, Faust up to Date (1888), Carmen up to Data (1890), Cinder Ellen up too Late (1891) and Don Juan (1892, with lyrics by Adrian Ross).

Fred Leslie, Marion Hood and Nellie Farren in the Birmingham premiere

John Hollingshead had managed the Gaiety Theatre from 1868 to 1886 as a venue for variety, continental operetta, light comedy, and numerous musical burlesques composed or arranged by the theatre's music director, Wilhelm Meyer Lutz. Hollingshead called himself a "licensed dealer in legs, short skirts, French adaptations, Shakespeare, taste and musical glasses." In 1886, Hollingshead ceded the management of the theatre to George Edwardes, whom he had hired in 1885. Edwardes expanded the burlesque format from one act to full-length pieces with original music by Lutz, instead of scores compiled from popular tunes, as was the usual course before that. The theatre's choreographer and dance-master, under both Hollingshead and Edwardes, was John D'Auban. Nellie Farren, as the theatre's "principal boy", starred at the Gaiety for over 20 years, from 1868. Between 1885 and 1891, she co-starred with Fred Leslie, who wrote many of the Gaiety's most popular burlesques under his pseudonym, "A. C. Torr". In the early 1890s, as burlesque went out of fashion, Edwardes changed the focus of the theatre from musical burlesque to the new genre of Edwardian musical comedy.

Ruy Blas was written to mark the reopening of the Gaiety theatre and the return to the West End of the hugely popular Gaiety company, led by Farren and Leslie, who had been on tour in the U.S. and Australia. The early scenes of the libretto make many allusions to this return. In his review, the critic Clement Scott remarked not only on the new piece but on the redecoration of the theatre, which he found "deserving of the highest praise". The scenery and the costumes, as usual, were among the prominent attractions of a Gaiety show. Percy Anderson's costumes were particularly admired.

The scene to which Henry Irving took exception was a comic dance, performed to Lutz's pas de quatre from Faust up to Date, in which Fred Leslie, Ben Nathan, Charles Danby and Fred Storey were made up to resemble Irving, Wilson Barrett, J. L. Toole and Edward Terry. In addition to impersonating the four actors, Leslie and his colleagues were wearing petticoats, imitating the female stars who danced to the same tune in the earlier work. Reviewing the Birmingham premiere, The Era hinted broadly that this scene was vulgar and should be dropped, and the paper regretted in its review of the London first night that its hint had not been taken.

== Cast ==
Linda Verner in the premiere

- Ruy Blas – Nellie Farren
- Don Caesar de Bazan – Fred Leslie
- Queen of Spain – Marion Hood
- Donna Elto – Letty Lind
- Donna Christina – Sylvia Grey
- Duchess Agio Uncertanti – Linda Verner
- Tarara, a trumpeter – Blanche Massey (miscredited as Blanche Massie)
- An officer – Alice Young
- Don Salluste – Charles Danby (later replaced by Dalton Sommers)
- Major Domo – Ben Nathan
- Court Physician – Fred Storey
- Cerayonez – William Benson

Servants, Pages, Lords, Ladies, Algauzils, Nobles, Musicians, &c., &c.

== Musical numbers ==
Programme for the Gaiety production

Act I

- Chorus, "Bolero"
- Song, "The Villain" – Don Salluste
- Chorus, "Hail to our Queen"
- Song, "The Song of my Heart" – Queen of Spain
- Chorus, "Private Theatricals"
- Trio, "Razzle Dazzle" – Ruy Blas, Don Caesar and Don Salluste
- Pas seul, "Danse espagnole" – Donna Christina
- Eccentric dance – Court Physician
- Duet and pas de deux, "Ma's Advice" – Ruy Blas and Don Caesar
- Finale, "We're discovered"

Act II

- Song and duet, "The Whistling Lullaby" – Don Caesar and Ruy Blas
- Song, "The Flower Song" – Queen of Spain
- Chorus, "Good Night"
- Song, "Stick to the Whisky you're used to – Don Caesar
- Duet, "I've just had a Wire" – Ruy Blas and Don Caesar
- Duet, "Johnny Jones and his Sister Sue" – Donna Etto and Don Salluste
- Letty Lind Waltz (composed by C. Paston Cooper and danced by Letty Lind)
- Pas de quatre, "Blanc et noir" – Ruy Blas, Donna Etto, Don Caesar and Court Physician
- Finale, "The Sweep's Chorus"

Act III

- Fan chorus
- Pas de deux – Donna Christina and Court Physician
- Dance, "Rigodon"
- Song, "What Price That?" – Ruy Blas
- Song, "Love's Message" – Queen of Spain
- Pas de deux – Ruy Blas and Donna Etto
- Pas seul – Don Caesar
- Pas de quatre – Don Caesar, Don Salluste, Major Domo and Court Physician
- Finale

== Synopsis ==
Sylvia Grey in the premiere

Act I – Throne room in royal palace

The Queen of Spain is not happy, and as soon as she is left alone she says so ("The Flower Song"). Ruy Blas and Don Caesar are introduced to the royal palace in the capacity of strolling players. Don Salluste, a corrupt court official, has private reasons to wish to humiliate the Queen, and he persuades Ruy and Caesar to disguise themselves as women and apply for posts in the royal household. They are accepted, and Salluste then accuses the Queen of smuggling men into her private apartments, disguised as women. Ruy and Caesar are arrested and jailed.

Act II
Scene 1 – Cells of misdemeanants of the first class

Ruy and Caesar find that their imprisonment is extraordinarily luxurious, but despite its attractions they escape, with the connivance of the Queen.

Scene 2 – Interior of Don Salluste's house

Ruy and Caesar attempt to burgle Don Salluste's safe and find that he has got himself locked inside it. They release him, but he is immediately arrested because in his safe are found some of the Queen's jewels, which he has stolen.

Act III – Palace gardens

Ruy Blas wins the Queen's heart by various daring deeds, including bullfighting. He is proclaimed King, and Don Caesar is appointed to the post of Lord Chamberlain vacated by the disgraced Salluste.

== Critical reception ==
The critics generally viewed the libretto as a departure from the old traditions of burlesque, because its resemblance to the original work was tangential, and because Hugo's Ruy Blas was not well enough known in England to be a fruitful subject for parody. In The Theatre, Clement Scott wrote, "As to the play on which the burlesque is supposed to be founded, save in the first act, where it is fairly closely followed, we hear but little of it." Moonshine magazine went so far as to call Ruy Blas "Probably the worst burlesque ever seen … for it does not give the faintest caricature of the original."

The theatrical newspaper The Era reported that, entertaining though the new piece was, it had little by way of a plot, commenting: "And now the travestie, in losing some of its old attributes – a coherent plot, for instance, and other such details – has annexed so much from comic opera, so much from extravaganza, and so much from the music halls, that it fills up the entire bill from dinner time till nearing midnight." The performances, the music and the staging on the other hand, were consistently praised.
