= Carmen up to Data =

Musical burlesque by Meyer Lutz, G. R. Sims and Henry Pettitt

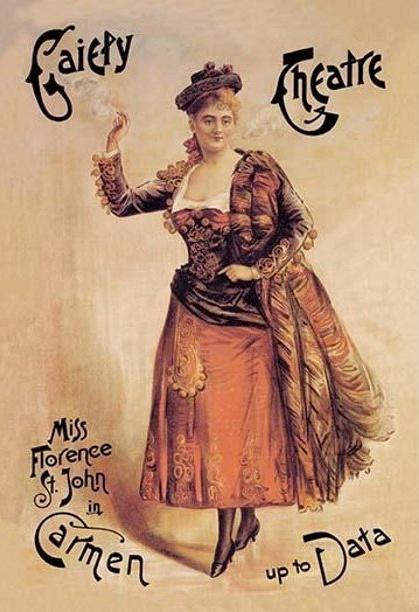
- Florence St. John in the title role
- Music: Meyer Lutz
- Lyrics: G. R. Sims; Henry Pettitt
- Book: G. R. Sims; Henry Pettitt
- Productions: 1890 West End

Carmen up to Data is a musical burlesque with a score written by Meyer Lutz. Set in Seville, the piece was a spoof of Bizet's 1875 opera Carmen. The libretto was written by G. R. Sims and Henry Pettitt.

After a tryout in Liverpool in September 1890, the piece premiered at the Gaiety Theatre, London, on 4 October 1890, produced by George Edwardes. It starred Florence St. John in the title role, Letty Lind as Mercedes, Jenny Dawson as Escamillo, Maria Jones as Michaela, Blanche Massey as Morales, Horace Mills as Remendado, E. J. Lonnen as José and Arthur Williams as Captain Zuniga.

The piece was a success and toured throughout the English-speaking world, reaching Australia by 1892.

== Background ==
Bizet's Carmen had first been produced in English in London in 1878 at Her Majesty's Theatre, starring Selina Dolaro and Durward Lely. An earlier burlesque of Carmen, called Carmen: or, Sold for a Song, by Robert Reece, had also been produced at the Folly Theatre in 1879, and several other burlesques followed. Burlesque of opera or classical works was popular in Britain from the 1860s to the 1880s. Other examples at the Gaiety include The Bohemian G-yurl and the Unapproachable Pole (1877), Blue Beard (1882), Ariel (1883, by F. C. Burnand), Galatea, or Pygmalion Reversed (1883), Little Jack Sheppard (1885), Monte Cristo Jr. (1886), Miss Esmeralda (1887), Frankenstein, or The Vampire's Victim (1887), Mazeppa, Faust up to Date (1888), Ruy Blas and the Blasé Roué (1888), Cinder Ellen up too Late (1891), and Don Juan (1892, with lyrics by Adrian Ross).

John Hollingshead managed the Gaiety Theatre from 1868 to 1886 as a venue for variety, continental operetta, light comedy, and numerous musical burlesques composed or arranged by the theatre's music director, Wilhelm Meyer Lutz. Hollingshead called himself a "licensed dealer in legs, short skirts, French adaptations, Shakespeare, taste and musical glasses." In 1886, Hollingshead ceded the management of the theatre to George Edwardes, whom he had hired in 1885. Edwardes expanded the burlesque format from one act to full-length pieces with original music by Lutz, instead of scores compiled from popular tunes, and choreography by the theatre's dance-master, John D'Auban. Nellie Farren, as the theatre's "principal boy," and Fred Leslie starred at the Gaiety for over 20 years. Leslie wrote many of its pieces under his pseudonym, "A. C. Torr". In the early 1890s, as Burlesque went out of fashion, Edwardes changed the focus of the theatre from musical burlesque to the new genre of Edwardian musical comedy.

== Critical reception ==
In the December 1890 issue of Punch magazine, the reviewer wrote, "In calling their burlesque Carmen up to Data possibly the two dear clever boys who wrote it intended some crypto-jocosity of which the hidden meaning is known only to the initiated in these sublime mysteries. Why 'Data'? On the other hand, 'Why not?' However attractive or not as a heading in a bill of the play, the Gaiety Carmen is, on the whole, a merry, bright, and light burlesque-ish piece."
