= Little Jack Sheppard =

Victorian burlesque by Henry Pottinger Stephens and William Yardley

Fred Leslie and Nellie Farren as Wild and Jack

Little Jack Sheppard is a burlesque melodrama written by Henry Pottinger Stephens and William Yardley, with music by Meyer Lutz, with songs contributed by Florian Pascal, Corney Grain, Arthur Cecil, Michael Watson, Henry J. Leslie, Alfred Cellier and Hamilton Clarke. The comedy lampooned the serious plays based on the life of Jack Sheppard, especially the popular 1839 play by John Buckstone, which was in turn based on the novel of that year by William Harrison Ainsworth.

The piece opened at the Gaiety Theatre in London on 26 December 1885 and initially ran for 155 performances. It featured Nellie Farren as Jack Sheppard, Fred Leslie as Jonathan Wild, David James as Blueskin. Marion Hood and Sylvia Grey. Other cast members included Willie Warde, who also choreographed the dances. The piece was presented in the U.S. and Australia in 1886 and was given revivals and extensive tours in Britain for nearly a decade.

== Background ==
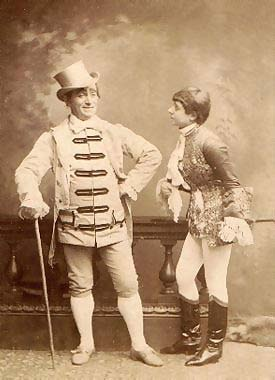
David James and Nellie Farren as Blueskin and Jack

This production was to be John Hollingshead's last burlesque at the Gaiety Theatre, and George Edwardes joined as his co-producer. Hollingshead had created a popular following at the Gaiety Theatre for musical burlesque. Other examples include The Bohemian G-yurl and the Unapproachable Pole (1877), Blue Beard (1882), Ariel (1883, by F. C. Burnand), and Galatea, or Pygmalion Reversed (1883). Beginning with Little Jack Sheppard, however, Hollingshead's successor, George Edwardes, expanded the format of the burlesques to full-length pieces with original music by Meyer Lutz, instead of scores compiled from popular tunes. These included Monte Cristo Jr. (1886); Miss Esmeralda (1887), Frankenstein, or The Vampire's Victim (1887), Mazeppa, Faust up to Date (1888), Ruy Blas and the Blasé Roué (1888), Carmen up to Data (1890), Cinder Ellen up too Late (1891), and Don Juan (1892, with lyrics by Adrian Ross).

John Hollingshead had managed the Gaiety Theatre from 1868 to 1886 as a venue for variety, continental operetta, light comedy, and numerous musical burlesques composed or arranged by the theatre's music director, Wilhelm Meyer Lutz. Hollingshead called himself a "licensed dealer in legs, short skirts, French adaptations, Shakespeare, taste and musical glasses." In 1886, Hollingshead ceded the management of the theatre to Edwardes, whom he had hired in 1885. Nellie Farren, as the theatre's "principal boy", and Fred Leslie starred at the Gaiety for over 20 years. Leslie wrote many of its pieces under his pseudonym, "A. C. Torr". In the early 1890s, as burlesque went out of fashion, Edwardes changed the focus of the theatre from musical burlesque to the new genre of Edwardian musical comedy.

Many works of literature and theatre have been based on Sheppard's life. Perhaps the most prominent theatrical work is John Gay's The Beggar's Opera (1728). Sheppard was the inspiration for the character of Macheath, and his nemesis, Peachum, is based on Jonathan Wild. A melodrama, Jack Sheppard, The Housebreaker, or London in 1724, by William Thomas Moncrieff was published in 1825. Ainsworth's popular novel was published in Bentley's Miscellany from January 1839, with illustrations by George Cruikshank. Ainsworth's novel was adapted into a successful play by John Buckstone. The Ainsworth and Buckstone versions portrayed Sheppard as a swashbucking hero, and the fear that young people might emulate Sheppard's behaviour led the Lord Chamberlain to ban, at least in London, the licensing of any plays with "Jack Sheppard" in the title for forty years.

== Productions ==
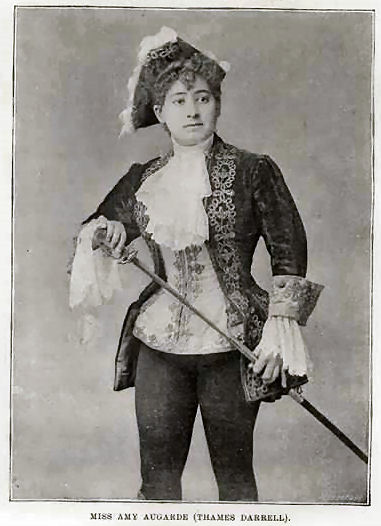
Amy Augarde as Thames Darrell in the revival of Little Jack Sheppard (1894)

Little Jack Sheppard opened at the Gaiety Theatre in London on 26 December 1885 and ran for 155 performances. It featured Nellie Farren as Jack Sheppard, Fred Leslie as Jonathan Wild, David James as Blueskin and Marion Hood as Winifred Other cast members included Willie Warde (who also choreographed the dances) and Sylvia Grey. The production marked the first appearances at the Gaiety of David James and Fred Leslie, and it was Marion Hood's first appearance in burlesque. Leslie introduced parodic elements caricaturing Oscar Wilde into his portrayal of Jonathan Wild In June 1886, the production was moved from the Gaiety to the less fashionable Grand Theatre, Islington, to make way for Henry E. Dixey's company. A new cast was engaged for the Islington production, while a touring company including most of the original principals took the piece around the English provinces. In December 1886, the touring company, still led by Farren and Leslie, returned to London and took over at the Grand Theatre.

The piece was produced in New York in 1886 at The Bijou Theatre and had its Australian premiere in Melbourne in December 1886 at the Opera House, with Fanny Robina as Jack and Lionel Brough as Wild. In 1887, a second English touring production was launched, with a new cast. Little Jack Sheppard continued to play in the provinces until late 1891. It was revived at the Gaiety in 1894, with a cast including Ellaline Terriss and Seymour Hicks.

== Synopsis ==
Programme for the 1887 touring company

The plot, as reported in The Era, 2 January 1886, was as follows:

Act I

"After a preliminary chorus of rustics, introducing the now threadbare allusion to three acres and a cow, we have the musical courtship of fascinating Winifred Wood and her lover Thames Darrell. Thames is being persecuted by his wicked uncle Sir Rowland Trenchard who has enlisted Jonathan Wild in his pay, and the latter presently brings his chorus of pretty Janissaries upon the scene. An attempt is made to seize Thames, who is, however, rescued by Jack and Blueskin, aided by an army of blue satin-clad swell mobsmen."

Act II

"The second act shows Jack carousing with his boon companions in a hall gorgeous enough to be Aladdin's Palace, but which is understood to be merely the 'cave of harmony' at the 'Crown and Sovereign' in the Mint. Here Blueskin presides over a free-and-easy with all the genial aplomb of a music hall chairman, and obliges the company with a spirited rendering of the quaint old ditty 'Botany Bay', which is, of course, given with the time-honoured whistling variations in the chorus. The 'harmony of the evening' is now rudely disturbed by Wild and his janissaries who, this time assisted by the military, take Jack prisoner."

Act III

"The third act transports us to the interior of Newgate [Prison], where we find Jack carving his name on the walls of the condemned cell, and keeping up his spirits by engaging in a duet and a pas de deux with his jailer, Wild. Blueskin now contrives to enter the prison in the guise of a turnkey, and with his help Jack effects his escape, the series of scenes in which the pair are shown traversing the cells and scaling the walls being apparently intended as a parody of the present fashion of mechanical scene changes.

"The final meet of all the characters takes place on Willesden green, where Wild and Sir Rowland are denounced as Jacobites by Jack, who receives as a reward the King's pardon, and forthwith marries the girl of his choice."

== Roles and original cast ==
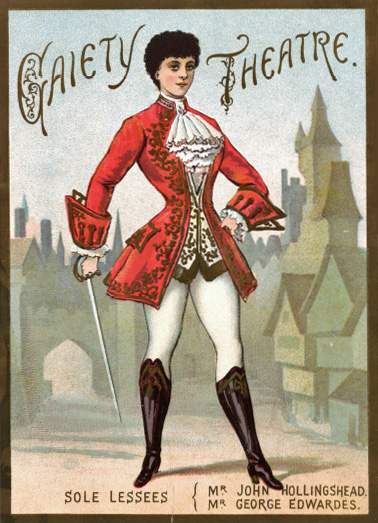
Cover of Gaiety Theatre programme, 1885

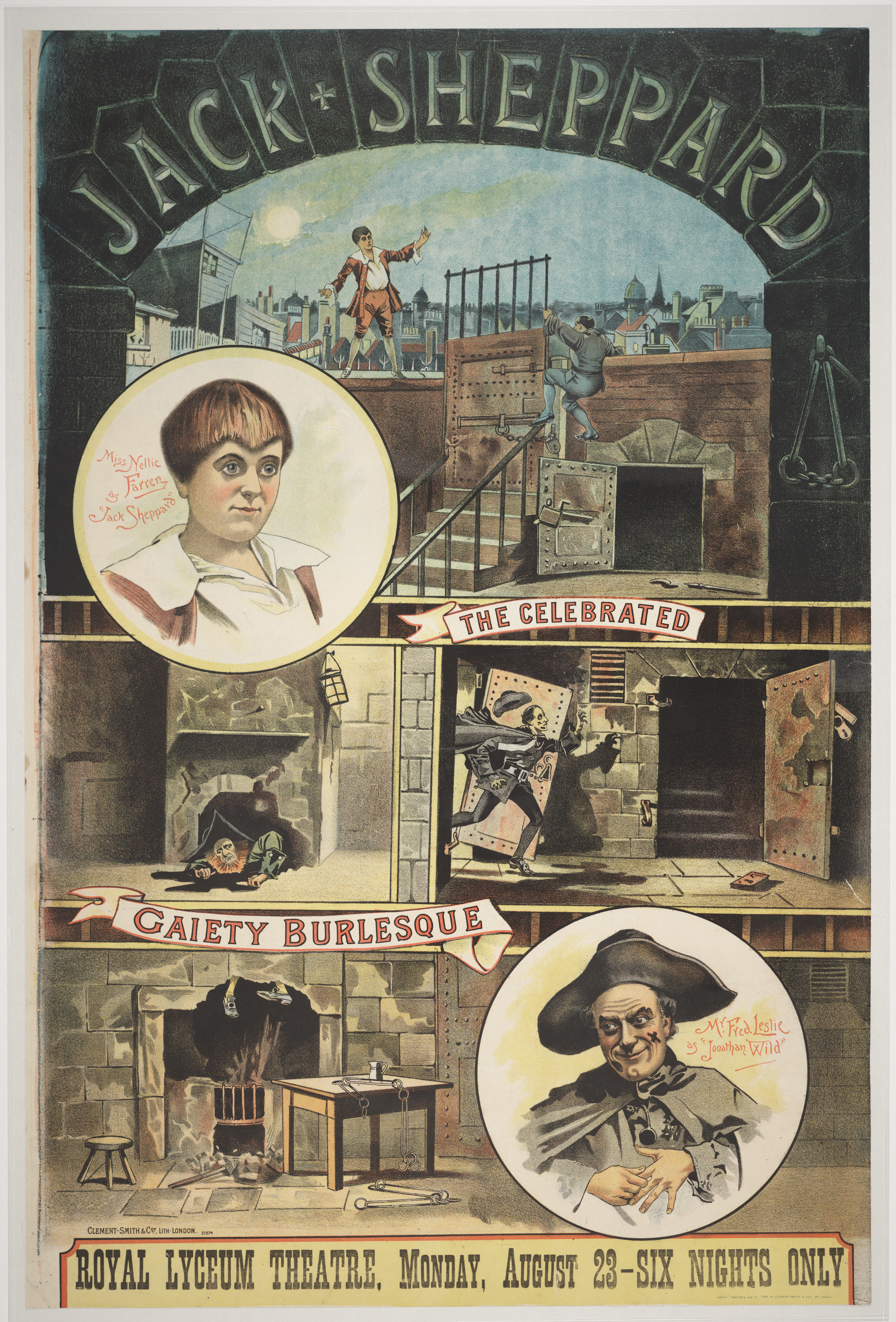
Poster for Edinburgh production

The original cast was as follows:

- Jack Sheppard – Nellie Farren
- Thames Darrell – Mathilde Wadman
- Blueskin – David James
- Jonathan Wild – Fred Leslie
- Sir Rowland Trenchard – Mr. Odell
- Abraham Mendez – F. Wood
- Mr. Kneebone – Willie Warde
- Mr. Wood – Mr. Guise
- Captain Cuff – Emily Duncan
- Shotbolt – Miss Ross
- Marvel – Miss Raines
- Ireton – Emily Robina
- Quilt Arnold – Miss Handley
- Little Gog – Miss Pearce
- Little Magog – Miss Tyler
- Mrs. Sheppard – Harriet Coveney
- Winifred Wood – Marion Hood
- Edgworth Bess – Bessie Sanson
- Polly Stanmore – Sylvia Grey
- Kitty Kettleby – Miss Eunice

Chorus of Peasants, Janissaries, Blueboys, Jacobites, Bridesmaids and Soldiers

== Musical numbers ==
The musical numbers were composed by Meyer Lutz, except as otherwise indicated:

- If you take into your head (Duet) – Florian Pascal
- Winifred Wood – Pascal
- A Fairy Tale (Duet) – Hamilton Clarke
- There once was a time, my darling – Alfred Cellier
- Farewell to Old England
- Polyglot Duet
- Keep the ball a-rolling (Quintet)
- Chorus and march of Janissaries – Pascal
- Jonathan Wild – Arthur Cecil
- Jack's alive 'O
- They call me the Belle of Dollis Hill – Pascal
- You mustn't believe all you hear
- Silver star – Pascal
- Leave the whole business to me (Trio)
- Botany Bay – Pascal
- All nations (Duet)
- Chorus of Peasants and Bridesmaids

== Critical reception ==
The Era praised the production and the music for their unusual refinement, but found the libretto inadequate: "Messrs. Stephens and Yardley … have aimed at decorum, and succeeded in hitting dulness." The paper went so far as to write of "the vapid, wishy-washy, flatulent quality of the stuff they have manufactured between them." Nonetheless, the music, the staging and the performances adequately compensated, and made it "a capital evening's entertainment." Other critics, including that of The Theatre, were more favourably disposed towards the libretto, and in agreement with The Era about the excellence of the music, the production and the performers. The Graphic wrote, "A company equally strong for the representation of pieces of this class has rarely if ever been assembled. ... A prettier spectacle to behold, from the opening rustic ballet down to the marvellous scenic changes of the escape from Newgate, is certainly nowhere to be seen."
