= The Red Hussar =

Arthur Williams as Corporal Bundy

The Red Hussar is a comedy opera in three acts by Edward Solomon, with a libretto by Henry Pottinger Stephens, concerning a young ballad singer who disguises herself as a Hussar to follow her penniless beloved to France. By a feat of gallantry, she saves his life and is promoted to the rank of sergeant. It turns out that she is a rich heiress, and all ends happily.

The piece opened at the Lyric Theatre in London on 23 November 1889, running for 175 performances. It was the revised version of an opera written several years earlier called The White Sergeant. It starred Marie Tempest, Hayden Coffin, Arthur Williams and later John Le Hay.

The show also had a New York run, opening on 3 August 1890 at Palmer's Theatre until 11 October, with Tempest making her American debut, and then moving to the Grand Opera House. The Red Hussar has enjoyed other revivals.

== Roles ==
- Ralph Rodney – Ben Davies
- Sir Middlesex Mashem – Albert Christian
- Corporal Bundy – Arthur Williams
- Sir Harry Leighton – C. Hayden Coffin
- Mr. William Byles – Frank M. Wood
- Private Smith – S. King (later replaced by John Le Hay)
- Gaylord – A. Ferrand
- Maybud – G. Willoughby
- Kitty Carroll – Marie Tempest
- Barbara Bellasys – Florence Dysart
- Daisy – Maud Holland
- Mrs. Magpie – W. Sidney

== Musical numbers ==
- Overture

Act I – The Inn Yard of the "Crown," Lyndhurst

- No. 1. Chorus with solos, and Song: Bundy – "Merry England" and "Won't you join the army?"
- No. 2. Sir Harry Leighton – "My love and I were singing; my love and I were young"
- No. 3. Ralph Rodney – "When life and I were first acquainted, then life was old and I was young"
- No. 4. Sir Harry Leighton, Ralph Rodney & Barbara – "Pray understand I keep my hand"
- No. 5. Valse Song: Kitty Carroll – "Wand'ring at will o'er dale and hill, gaily my voice is ringing"
- No. 6. Chorus of Soldiers & Villagers – "Tramp, tramp, tramp, tramp, onward we go, boys"
- No. 7. Sir Middlesex Mashem & Chorus – "I am a soldier of renown, a veritable hero"
- No. 8. Concerted Piece: Kitty, Bundy & Soldiers – "Come, sing to us, or forfeit pay" & "When I was but a little child"
- No. 9. Kitty & Rodney – "One winter morn, a maid forlorn sat weeping, weeping by the way"
- No. 10. Finale Act I – "My lad, 'tis time for us to start"
- Entr'acte

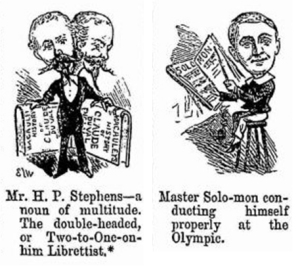
Librettist and composer caricatured in a Punch review of their opera Claude Duval

Act II – The English Camp, near Bruges, France

- No. 11. Chorus – "Old Bruges' belfry tells the world that fading is the day"
- No. 12. Sabot Dance and Solo
- No. 13. For Exit of Girls – "Old Bruges' belfry tells the earth that faded is the day"
- No. 14. Sir Harry – "I am lord of a castle, so fair, so grand, that I built of mine own free will"
- No. 15. Mrs. Magpie & Bundy – "There was a pretty maiden, and she lov'd a sailor bold"
- No. 16. Barbara – "My love must be a soldier with a great large heart"
- No. 17. Drummer Boys' Chorus – "You may tell by our manners airy, we belong to the military!"
- No. 18. Recit. & Song of the Regiment: Kitty and Chorus – "Thanks, comrades, thanks for this your greeting"
- No. 19. Rodney – "How calm and still the night! How soft and dim the light!"
- No. 20. Kitty & Rodney – "My Kitty, dear, how came you here? So far away from home"
- No. 21. Finale Act II – "Hasn't she a soft white hand!"
- Entr'acte

Act III – The Garden and Terrace of Avon Manor

- No. 22. Chorus – "A Jubilee! A Jubilee! A Jubilee today!"
- No. 23. Chorus of Children (Bridesmaids & Drummer Boys) – "Happy little maidens all are we"
- No. 24. Country Dance
- No. 25. Kitty – "I dreamt I was a child again, and stood by a silver sea"
- No. 26. Bundy – "I intend to sing a song with variations"
- No. 27. Kitty, Barbara, Mrs. Magpie, Rodney, Leighton & Sir Middlesex – "One little kiss"
- No. 28. Finale Act III – "Steady, boys, steady; ready, boys, ready"
