= Frederick Hobson Leslie =

English actor, singer, comedian and dramatist (1855–1892)

Photograph of Frederick Leslie by W. & D. Downey

Frederick George Hobson, known as Fred Leslie (1 April 1855 – 7 December 1892), was an English actor, singer, comedian and dramatist.

Beginning his career in operetta, Leslie became best known for starring in, and writing (under the pseudonym A. C. Torr, a pun on the word "actor"), popular burlesque plays and other comic works of theatre.

== Biography ==
Leslie was born in Woolwich, London. He was the youngest son of Charles Hobson, a wealthy military outfitter, and Sarah Hobson, née Pye. Leslie was educated in Woolwich, Lewisham and Pas-de-Calais. As a young man, he performed in amateur plays while working in commerce. He married Louisa (Louie) Agate in 1879. The couple had three children. The oldest of them, William Herbert Leslie Hobson (1880–1945), became a stage and film actor and singer also using the name "Fred Leslie".

=== Career ===
After briefly touring the British provinces, he made his first stage appearance in London at the Royalty Theatre as old Colonel Hardy in Paul Pry in 1878. He was soon engaged by Kate Santley at the Royalty, where he played the title role in Mr Lewis. At the same theatre in 1879, he played the part of Po-Hi opposite Santley in Tita in Thibet, a two-act comedy musical by Frank Desprez. He next played Agamemnon (under the name of "Mr Leslie") in La belle Hélène by Jacques Offenbach. His vocal quality suited him to play the comic baritone roles in French operettas. He soon appeared in operettas such as Madame Favart, La fille du tambour-major (1880) and Olivette; and he played Faust in Mefistofele (1880) with Constance Loseby as Marguerite and Lionel Brough as Valentine. In addition, he played some leading roles in musical theatre pieces under the management of Selina Dolaro at the Folly Theatre and at the Alhambra Theatre in The Bronze Horse (1891) La petite mademoiselle and Les manteaux noirs, among others.

Fred Leslie and Nellie Farren in Little Jack Sheppard

In 1882, Leslie found wide success as the title character in the operetta Rip Van Winkle, by Robert Planquette, at the Comedy Theatre, also starring W. S. Penley. In 1882 and 1883 he played in America at the Casino Theatre and elsewhere with the McCaull Comic Opera Company in The Merry War and The Beggar Student. In 1884 he played in Fay o' Fire, which featured Marie Tempest in one of her first roles. The same year, at the Comedy Theatre, he played in H. B. Farnie and Edmond Audran's adaptation, The Great Mogul with Florence St. John, Frank Wyatt and Arthur Roberts.

In 1885 Leslie joined the Gaiety Theatre, London company as Jonathan Wild in H. P. Stephens and W. Yardley's burlesque Little Jack Sheppard, with music by Meyer Lutz, and also starring Nellie Farren as Jack. The piece was a hit, and for the next seven years he and Farren were the pillars of the popular Gaiety Theatre burlesques. In 1887, his Miss Esmeralda was successful; Frankenstein, or The Vampire's Victim, in which he played a monster in touch with his feminine side, was a flop. In 1888–89, Leslie, with Farren's Gaiety company, toured in the US and Australia, in Monte Cristo Jr. and Miss Esmeralda (together with Sylvia Grey, Marion Hood and Letty Lind). At the same time, Leslie played roles in other pieces, for example David Garrick by Thomas W. Robertson at the Gaiety in 1886.

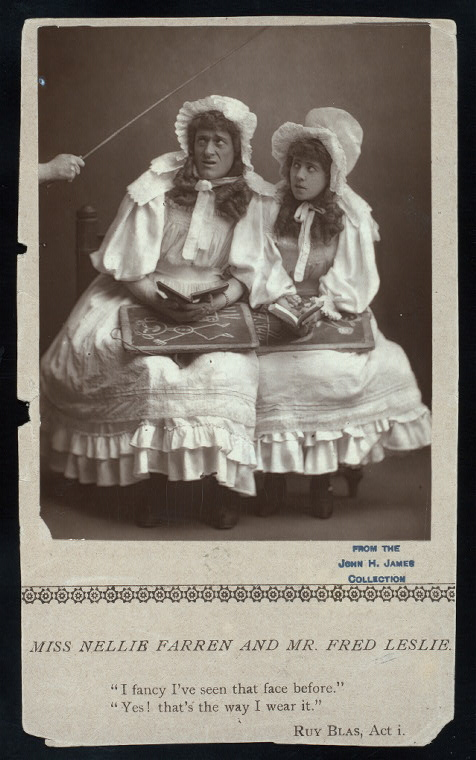
Nellie Farren and Fred Leslie performing the "Slate Duet" in Ruy Blas and the Blasé Roué, Gaiety Theatre

Leslie's Don Caesar de Bazan in Ruy Blas and the Blasé Roué (1888, a take off of Victor Hugo's play Ruy Blas), was perhaps the most popular of his later parts, and he and Farren starred at the Gaiety and toured in this production and in Miss Esmeralda, and Joan of Arc (1891). In 1891, Leslie and Farren again toured Australia with the Gaiety company in Ruy Blas and Cinder Ellen up too Late (with Sidney Jones as conductor). Leslie died while rehearsing for his last burlesque, Don Juan (with lyrics by Adrian Ross). His early death, coupled with Farren's illness and retirement in 1892, brought to an end the type of Gaiety burlesque associated with them, at the same time that Edwardian musical comedy came to dominate the London theatre.

Leslie was known for his versatility, agility, entertaining personality and talent as a mimic. His performances, including singing (he was a baritone), dancing, clowning and whistling, were noted for their "high spirits and ludicrous charm". Under the pseudonym of "A. C. Torr", he was part-author of many of his burlesques and also wrote the burlesque Guy Fawkes Jr for Arthur Roberts in 1890. Although Leslie is remembered best for the burlesques, he was a fine comic actor whom the critic Clement Scott called "one of the great lyric and comic artists of my time."

=== Early death ===
Leslie died of typhoid fever at his home in London at the age of 37. He was buried in Charlton Cemetery in Greenwich, England.
