= Monte Cristo Jr. (Victorian burlesque) =

Victorian burlesque by Meyer Lutz, Richard Henry and others

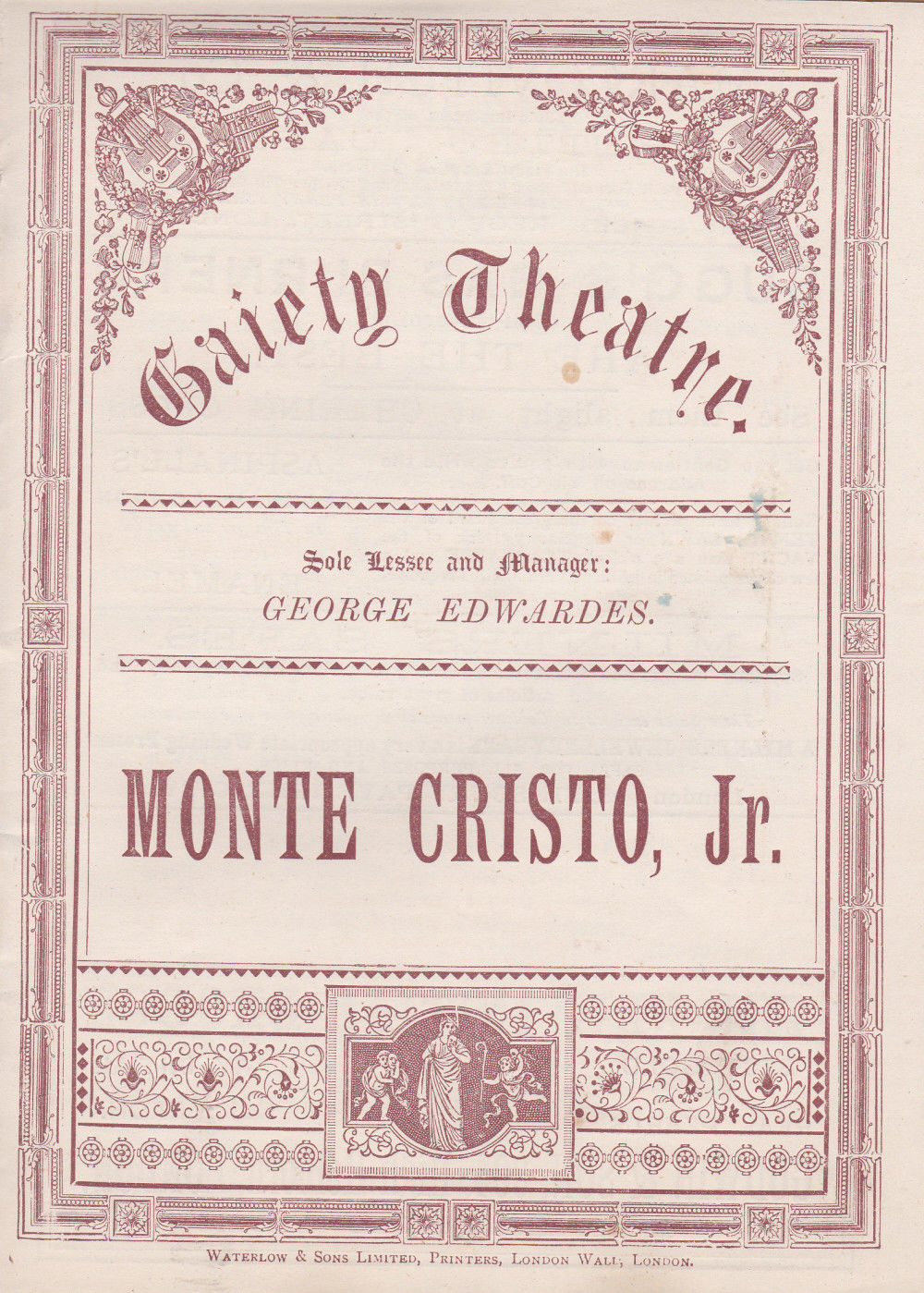
Cover of the 1887 programme for Monte Cristo Jr.

Monte Cristo Jr. was a Victorian burlesque with a libretto written by Richard Henry, a pseudonym for the writers Richard Butler and Henry Chance Newton. The score was composed by Meyer Lutz, Ivan Caryll, Hamilton Clarke, Tito Mattei, G. W. Hunt and Henry J. Leslie. The ballet and incidental dances were arranged by John D'Auban, and the theatre's musical director, Meyer Lutz, conducted. The play's doggerel verse was loosely based on The Count of Monte Cristo by Alexandre Dumas.

The piece was first performed under the management of George Edwardes, premiering at the Gaiety Theatre in London on 23 December 1886. Nellie Farren, E. J. Lonnen, Fred Leslie, Marion Hood and Jenny Lind appeared in the cast during the run, which ended in early October 1887. It was then toured in Britain, and the following year it was mounted in New York and toured in Australia.

A separate musical of the same name (except with a comma after "Cristo") premiered on Broadway in 1919, composed by Sigmund Romberg.

== Background ==
Burlesque of opera or classical works was popular in Britain from the 1860s to the 1880s. Other examples at the Gaiety include The Bohemian G-yurl and the Unapproachable Pole (1877), Blue Beard (1882), Ariel (1883, by F. C. Burnand), Galatea, or Pygmalion Reversed (1883), Little Jack Sheppard (1885), Miss Esmeralda (1887), Frankenstein, or The Vampire's Victim (1887), Mazeppa, Faust up to Date (1888), Ruy Blas and the Blasé Roué (1888), Carmen up to Data (1890), Cinder Ellen up too Late (1891), and Don Juan (1892, with lyrics by Adrian Ross).

John Hollingshead managed the Gaiety Theatre from 1868 to 1886 as a venue for variety, continental operetta, light comedy, and numerous musical burlesques composed or arranged by the theatre's music director, Wilhelm Meyer Lutz. Hollingshead called himself a "licensed dealer in legs, short skirts, French adaptations, Shakespeare, taste and musical glasses." In 1886, Hollingshead ceded the management of the theatre to George Edwardes, whom he had hired in 1885. Edwardes expanded the burlesque format from one act to full-length pieces with original music by Lutz, instead of scores compiled from popular tunes, and choreography by the theatre's dance-master, John D'Auban. Nellie Farren, as the theatre's "principal boy", and Fred Leslie starred at the Gaiety for over 20 years. Leslie wrote many of its pieces under his pseudonym, "A. C. Torr". In the early 1890s, as Burlesque went out of fashion, Edwardes changed the focus of the theatre from musical burlesque to the new genre of Edwardian musical comedy.

== Musical numbers ==
=== Act I ===
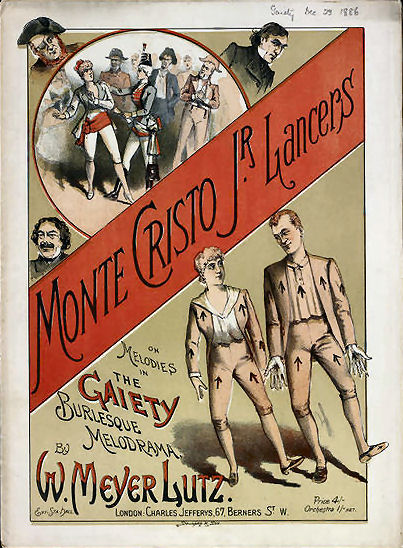
Sheet music cover for the Monte Cristo Jr. Lancers (1886) by Lutz

- 1 Chorus - On the Shores of the Mediterranean
- 2 Mércedes - Cupid Caught Me (Vocal Waltz)
- 3 Sailors Chorus
- 4 Dance A La Hornpipe
- 5 Graceful Dance (Miss Sylvia Grey)
- 6 Wedding Chorus - Tempo Di Polka
- 7 Noirtier - Recitation and Song - Je Suis Un Grand Detective
- 8 Melus - Recognition
- 9 Duet (De Villefort and Noirtier) - The Respectable Son and His Awful Dad
- 10 Finale - Act I

=== Act II ===
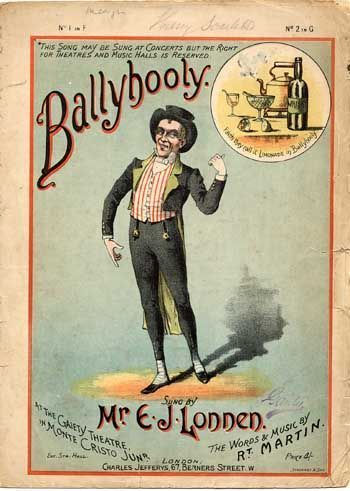
Sheet music cover for "Ballyhooly"

- 11 Entr'act
- 12 Patrol Chorus
- 13 Melus A La Trovatore
- 14 Duet - Dantes and Noirtier - 77 & 93
- 15 Melus - The Leap
- 16 The Sack Scene
- 17 Storm
- 18 The Guides' Quartett
- 19 Chorus of Explorers
- 20 Song - Ballyhooly (De Villefort)
- 21 Soli & Chorus - On A Picnic If You're Going
- 22 Finale - Act II - From This Hour

=== Act III ===
- 23 Chorus & March - The Patrol
- 24 Song (Dantes) - A Jolly Little Chap All Round
- 25 Imitation Song (Noirtier)
- 26 Sestett & Galop
- 27 Chorus By Fernand - We're Invited
- 28 Mashers' Chorus
- 29 March
- 30 Mazurka & Finale

== 1886 Gaiety Theatre Cast ==
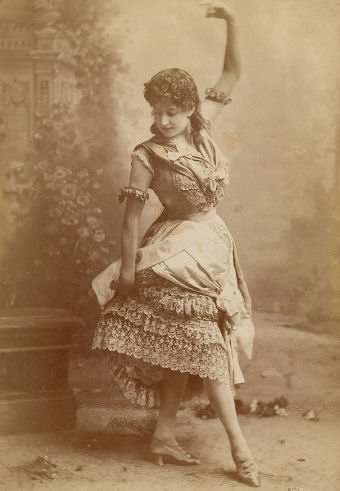
Lottie Collins as Mariette in Monte Cristo Jr. (1886)

- Edmond Dantes, a young sailor – Nellie Farren
- Fernand, a Catalan fisherman – Jennie McNulty
- Mércedes, betrothed to Dantes – Marion Hood / Agnes Delaporte
- Mariette, a lively young person – Lottie Collins / Letty Lind (from 1887)
- Albert, a fast youth – Lizzie Wilson
- Valentine, Morel's daughter – Sylvia Grey
- Carconte, a charming hag – Linda Verner
- Noirtier, Conspirator – Fred Leslie
- De Villefort, his son – E. J. Lonnen
- Danglars, a supercilious super cargo – E. Haslam
- Caderousse, tailor and toper – George Stone
- Morel, a shipowner – Charles Danby
- Boy at the Wheel – Charlie Ross

== Later productions ==
Monte Cristo Jr. later toured the United Kingdom with much of the London cast before a production by the London Gaiety Burlesque Company Tour opened at Dockstader's Theatre in New York on 2 April 1888 It then toured Australia in mid-1888 with Alfred Cellier as the conductor and a cast including Danby, Farren, Grey, Hood, Leslie and Lind. The Gaiety cast including Farren but augmented by a pretty female American chorus opened on 15 November 1888 in a reworked production at the Standard Theatre on Broadway. While the American audience was largely unappreciative of the play in general and its doggerel verse in particular, it did start a new craze for dancing in long and "swishy" skirts as displayed by the female chorus.
