= Sylvia Grey =

English actress, dancer and singer

Sylvia Grey

Sylvia Grey (1866–1958) was an English actress, dancer and singer best remembered for her roles in burlesques in London during the Victorian era.

== Life and career ==
Grey was born in London, England, partly of Swiss ancestry. She began her stage career at the age of 10 appearing in child roles in Shakespeare plays performed at Sadler's Wells Theatre in London. After two years, she continued with her education, graduating with a degree in music from Trinity College, London. Grey then sang professionally in a choir while continuing to study singing.

After initially performing a number of small roles at the Vaudeville Theatre, Grey moved to the Gaiety Theatre. The Gaiety presented musical burlesques that employed dancers, and so Grey studied dance with John D'Auban, among others, before debuting as a dancer in 1884. In 1885, she danced the role of Polly Flamborough in The Vicar of Wide-awake-field at the Gaiety and soon rose to become the principal dancer there. In addition to dancing, she often played comedy roles. Grey became known for her performances in Gaiety burlesques such as Monte Cristo Jr. and Little Jack Sheppard (1886), Miss Esmeralda (1887) and Ruy Blas and the Blasé Roué (1889 in London and then Australia). In 1891, she played one of the stepsisters in the Gaiety's Cinder Ellen up-too-Late after which the company, including Grey, toured the piece in Australia. She played Flo Fanshawe at the Prince of Wales's Theatre in In Town. In 1893, she played Donna Julia in Don Juan at the Gaiety (by Meyer Lutz, A. C. Torr and Adrian Ross). The Dramatic Peerage commented, "The poetry of motion has no more charming exponent than Miss Sylvia Grey".

In addition to appearing on stage, Grey also taught dance to actors and to wealthy clients, some of whom were drawn from the aristocracy. This provided her with a greater income than that she received from performing at the Gaiety. Among her many prominent students was Ellen Terry. Grey married in 1893, and her last West End performance was as the Countess Acacia in Baron Golosh in 1895 at the Trafalgar Theatre. During World War I, she ran an Australian Officer's Club in London. She made several French films in the 1920s, including Le Secret de Rosette Lambert (1920), La Maison du mystère (1923, as Marjorie) and Comment j'ai tué mon enfant (1925).
