= Frankenstein, or The Vampire's Victim =

Frankenstein
- or The Vampire's Victim
- Sheet music cover
- Music: Meyer Lutz
- Lyrics: Richard Butler; Henry Chance Newton
- Book: Richard Butler; Henry Chance Newton
- Productions: 1887 West End

Frankenstein, or The Vampire's Victim (sometimes called Frankenstein, or The Model Man) is a musical burlesque in three acts written by Richard Henry (a pseudonym of Richard Butler and Henry Chance Newton). The music was composed by Meyer Lutz. The piece is a burlesque loosely based on the 1818 Mary Shelley novel Frankenstein; or, The Modern Prometheus and the Adelphi Theatre drama based on the novel.

Opening at the Gaiety Theatre, London on 24 December 1887, the production ran until late April. It starred Nellie Farren as Dr. Frankenstein and Fred Leslie as a monster who is in touch with his feminine side. The Victorian audiences found the piece too feminist in tone. In addition, the public was annoyed at George Edwardes, who had reduced the size of the inexpensive "pit" in favour of more "stalls". The piece also featured Marion Hood as the doctor's love interest Tartina; E. J. Lonnen as the vampire Visconti; Emily Cross as Mary Ann; Sylvia Grey as Tamburina, goddess of the sun; Sybil Grey as Vanilla; the dancer John D'Auban as Demonico; and Frank Thornton as Schwank.

== Plot ==
Frankenstein, or The Vampire's Victim features a convoluted plot with Act I featuring a golem like creature who kidnaps Frankenstein in Germany; Act II featuring Frankenstein as a prisoner of Spanish bandits who eventually becomes their leader; and Act III beginning in the Vampire's Club and then after several misadventures ultimately concluding in the Arctic with a scene of dancing sailors and bears; one of whom is Frankenstein in disguise.

== Background ==
This type of work, the Victorian burlesque, was popular in Britain at the time. Other examples include The Bohemian G-yurl and the Unapproachable Pole (1877), Blue Beard (1882), Ariel (1883, by F. C. Burnand), Galatea, or Pygmalion Reversed (1883), Little Jack Sheppard (1885), Monte Cristo Jr. (1886), Miss Esmeralda (1887), Mazeppa, Faust up to Date (1888), Ruy Blas and the Blasé Roué (1888), Carmen up to Data (1890), and Don Juan (1892, with lyrics by Adrian Ross).

John Hollingshead had managed the Gaiety Theatre from 1868 to 1886 as a venue for variety, continental operetta, light comedy, and numerous musical burlesques composed or arranged by the theatre's music director, Wilhelm Meyer Lutz. Hollingshead called himself a "licensed dealer in legs, short skirts, French adaptations, Shakespeare, taste and musical glasses." In 1886, Hollingshead ceded the management of the theatre to George Edwardes, whom he had hired in 1885. Edwardes expanded the burlesque format from one act to full-length pieces with original music by Lutz, instead of scores compiled from popular tunes, and choreography by the theatre's dance-master, John D'Auban. Nellie Farren, as the theatre's "principal boy," and Fred Leslie starred at the Gaiety for over 20 years. Leslie wrote many of its pieces under his pseudonym, "A. C. Torr". In the early 1890s, as Burlesque went out of fashion, Edwardes changed the focus of the theatre from musical burlesque to the new genre of Edwardian musical comedy.
