= Meyer Lutz =

German-born British composer and conductor (1829–1903)

Lutz in 1894

Wilhelm Meyer Lutz (19 May 1829 – 31 January 1903) was a German-born British composer and conductor who is best known for light music, musical theatre and burlesques of well-known works.

Emigrating to the UK at the age of 19, Lutz started as an organist and soon became a theatrical conductor in London. After serving from 1850 to 1855 as music director of the Surrey Theatre, Lutz conducted touring opera companies and composed some serious music and music for the Christy Minstrels. In 1869, he was engaged as the music director of the Gaiety Theatre, London, arranging and later composing a series of popular burlesques over the next 25 years. Lutz continued to compose songs into the 20th century.

== Life and career ==
Lutz was born in Münnerstadt, Bavaria, Germany. His parents were Joseph Lutz (1801–1879), a music professor, and Magdalena (1809–1862). His older brother, Baron Johann Lutz, became the prime minister of Bavaria under King Ludwig II of Bavaria. Lutz studied music first with his father, then at the University of Würzburg. He visited Britain, as a pianist, in 1846, and then moved to England in 1848 at the age of 19.

=== Early career ===
Lutz in 1868

Lutz began as an organist in churches at Birmingham and Leeds. Then, for many years, he played the organ at St George's Cathedral, Southwark. Lutz was also a Freemason, and served as the Grand Organist of the United Grand Lodge of England.

Lutz soon became a theatrical conductor. From 1850 to 1855, he conducted at the Surrey Theatre and later the Royalty Theatre. For that theatre, he composed two operas, the one-act The Charmed Harp (1852) and a grand opera, Faust and Marguerite (1855). After this, for many years, Lutz conducted concerts in the British provinces and touring opera troupes for Giulia Grisi, the tenor Mario and others. Some of these were led by the tenor Elliot Galer (the founder, in 1877, of the Royal Opera House in Leicester), who produced Lutz's opera Zaida, or, The Pearl of Granada (with a libretto by Oliver Summers) in 1859 in Liverpool. In the 1850s and 1860s he shared the concert podium at classical concerts with Julius Benedict both in the provinces and at St. James's Hall in London. In 1859, in Derby, England, Lutz played the piano for a series of ten "Concerts for the People" at the Temperance Hall. Galer also mounted three other Lutz operas at the Royalty Theatre in London: Blonde or Brunette (1862), Cousin Kate (1863), and Felix, or The Festival of the Roses (1865). During these years, Lutz also composed the cantatas Herne the Hunter (The Crystal Palace, 1862) and King Christmas (Oxford Music Hall, 1863), and music for the Christy Minstrels.

=== Gaiety Theatre years ===
In 1869, manager John Hollingshead hired Lutz as the resident musical director and conductor at the recently opened Gaiety Theatre, composing dances and songs for productions at that theatre, as well as conducting the orchestra for the operas, operettas, plays and burlesques mounted at the theatre. In this capacity, he conducted Thespis, the first Gilbert and Sullivan comic opera, in 1871.

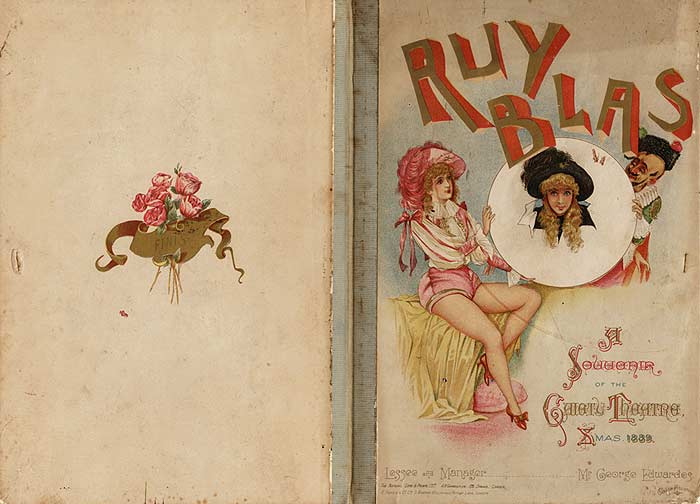
Souvenir programme from Ruy Blas

Lutz's early compositions for the Gaiety theatre included incidental music for Dreams (1869), a play by Thomas W. Robertson. The Miller of Milburg (1872). At the same time, Christine Nilsson performed his scena Xenia the Sclavonian Maiden (1869), and at the Covent Garden Promenade Concerts in 1873, his cantata, Legend of the Lys, was performed. He also composed music for such shows as On Condition (1882) and Posterity (1884) for Lila Clay's all-ladies troupe. He also composed the popular song, "Eyes of English Blue" for Alice Atherton.

At the Gaiety, Lutz compiled the scores, and later often composed original music, for a series of popular pasticcio entertainments, opera-bouffes and burlesques, including The Bohemian G-yurl and the Unapproachable Pole (1877); Robbing Roy (1879 by F. C. Burnand); a version of The Forty Thieves (1880, libretto by Robert Reece; Lutz had conducted an 1878 version of the same story); All in the Downs; or, Black-Eyed Susan (1881); Aladdin (1881); Oh! Those Girls (1882); Blue Beard (1882); Galatea, or Pygmalion Reversed (1883, with a libretto by Henry Pottinger Stephens); Ariel (1883, libretto by Burnand); and Mazeppa (1884).

George Edwardes took over management of the Gaiety in 1885 and expanded the format of the burlesques, commissioning Lutz to write original scores for the "new burlesques" at the theatre: Little Jack Sheppard (1885, libretto by Stephens); Monte Cristo Jr. (1886); Miss Esmeralda, or The Maid and the Monkey (1887); Frankenstein, or The Vampire's Victim (1887); Faust up to Date (1888, libretto by G. R. Sims and Henry Pettitt); Ruy Blas and the Blasé Roué (1889, libretto by Frederick Hobson Leslie and Herbert F. Clark); Carmen up to Data (1890, libretto by Sims and Pettitt); Cinder Ellen up too Late (1891, libretto by Leslie); and Don Juan (1892, book by Leslie, lyrics by Adrian Ross). The "Pas de quatre", a sprightly barn-dance written for Faust up to Date, remained popular for more than fifty years and has had at least two modern recordings. In 1893, with Albert O'Donnell Bartholeyns, he wrote A la Française.

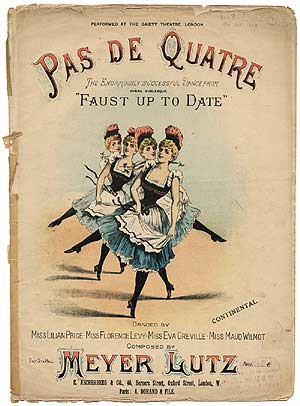
Sheet music to a dance from Faust up to date

During these years, Lutz continued in demand as a conductor throughout Britain and continued to compose religious and secular music. On 3 May 1886, the Gaiety Theatre hosted a selection of scenes played for Lutz's benefit, including scenes from Lutz's grand opera Faust and Marguerite, his burlesque Little Jack Sheppard and the operetta Karl and several recitations and solo pieces. The performers included Nellie Farren (who had sung under him in nearly all of his Gaiety pieces), Marion Hood, Durward Lely, Richard Temple and many others.

=== Later years ===
Lutz left the Gaiety in 1894 and was replaced by Ivan Caryll. For the Opera Comique in 1895, Lutz composed A Model Trilby, or A Day or Two after du Maurier. He also wrote additional songs for Baron Golosh for the Trafalgar Theatre (1895). Lutz wrote a string quartet and ballads such as "Thy Silv'ry Tones", "Enchant Mine Ear" and "Sail on Silver Cloud." In the last years of the 19th century, Lutz conducted a band playing Summer seasons at the spa in Scarborough. He continued to compose songs into the 20th century, including music for Hidenseek (1901) and a few numbers for Ivan Caryll and Cecil Cook's The Girl from Kays (1902). However, Lutz seems to have run low on funds, as another benefit was held for him on 28 November 1901 at the Gaiety Theatre, organised by George Edwardes.

Lutz was married in 1856 to Elizabeth Cook (b. 1835) and later to her sister Emily Cook (b. 1847). Their brothers were the bass Thomas Aynsley Cook and the baritone John Furneaux Cook, and their sister, Alice Aynsley Cook (c. 1850–1938) was an opera singer and musical comedy actress. His niece, Annie, married Eugene Goossens, Jr. Lutz also had a son, Caspar, who became a clergyman.

In printed works, such as scores and theatre programmes, Lutz was usually credited simply as Meyer Lutz. Some of his music was arranged for military band by J. A. Kappey. Lutz is mentioned in a P. G. Wodehouse novel, A Damsel in Distress (1919). In addition, a character called Herr Toots in the 1912 novel Bella by Edward Booth is based on Lutz, as is the character Meyer Klootz in the 1940 novel Town and Haven by Oswald Harland, both novels being set in late Victorian Scarborough (named "Spathorpe" in Bella, and "Whitcliff" in Town and Haven).

Lutz died of bronchitis at his home in Kensington, London at the age of 73. He was buried in St Mary's, Kensal Green.

== Selected works ==
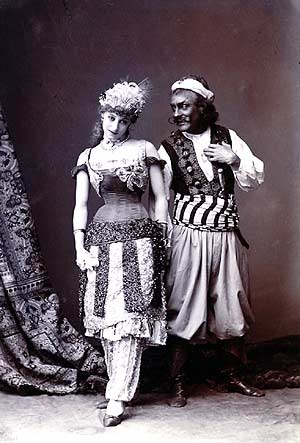
Robert Reece and Lutz's The Forty Thieves, 1880

- The Charmed Harp (1852) (Surrey Theatre)
- Faust and Marguerite (1855) (Surrey Theatre)
- Blonde or Brunette (1862) (Royalty Theatre)
- Felix, or The Festival of the Roses (1865) (Royalty Theatre)
- Zaida, or, The Pearl of Granada (1868) (Liverpool)
- The Miller of Milburg (1872) (Gaiety Theatre)
- Legend of the Lys (1873) (cantata)
- The Bohemian G-yurl and the Unapproachable Pole (1877) (Gaiety Theatre)
- Robbing Roy (1879) (Gaiety Theatre)
- The Forty Thieves (1880) (Gaiety Theatre)
- Galatea, or Pygmalion Reversed (1883) (Gaiety Theatre)
- Little Jack Sheppard (1885) (Gaiety Theatre)
- Miss Esmeralda, or The Maid and the Monkey (1887) (Gaiety Theatre)
- Frankenstein, or The Vampire's Victim (1887) (Gaiety Theatre)
- Faust up to Date (1888) (Gaiety Theatre)
- Ruy Blas and the Blasé Roué (1889) (in Birmingham, then at the Gaiety)
- Carmen up to Data (1890) (in Liverpool, then at the Gaiety)
- Cinder Ellen up too Late (1893) (Gaiety Theatre)
- A Model Trilby, or A Day or Two after du Maurier (1895) (Opera Comique)
