= Letty Lind =

British actor and dancer

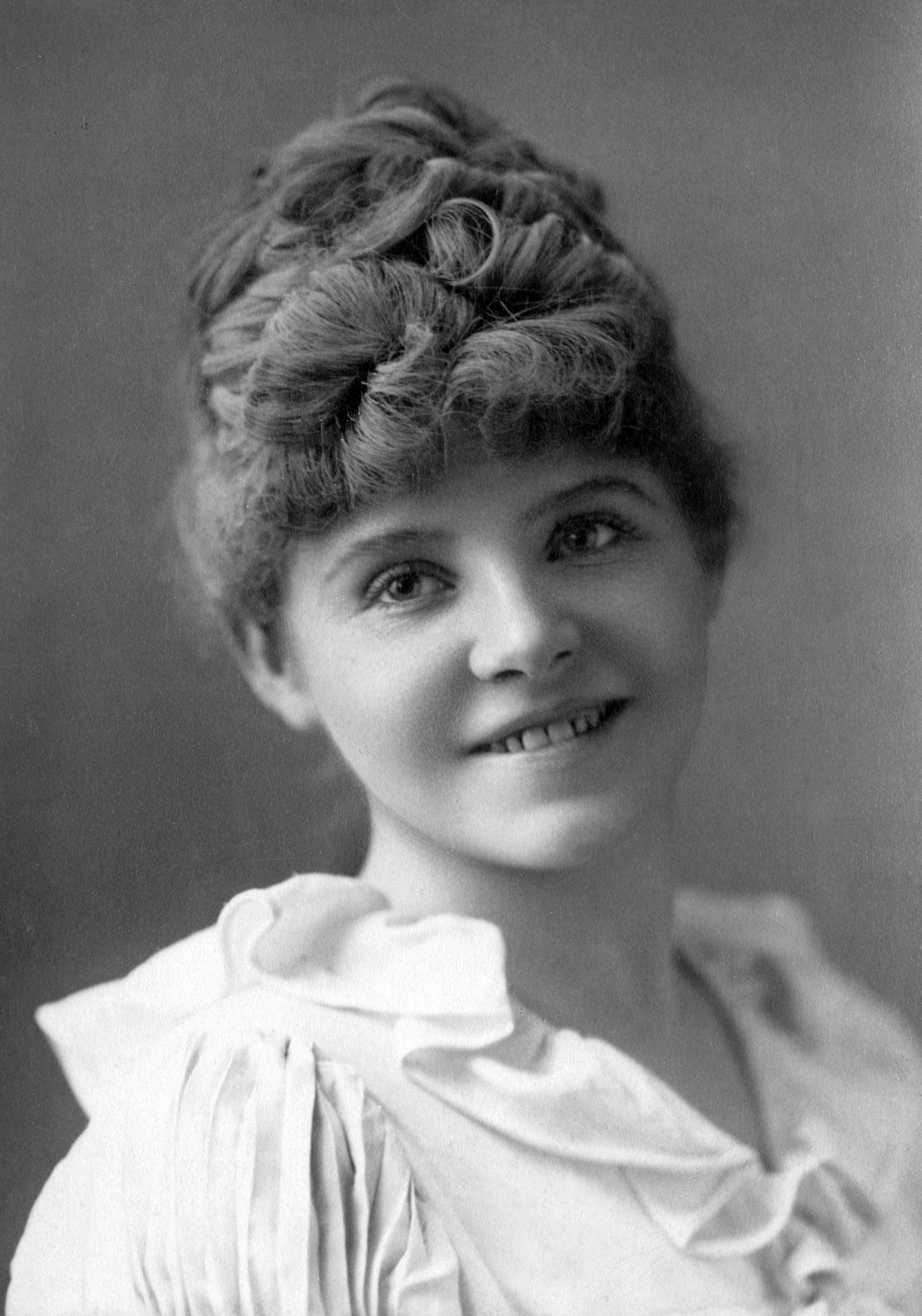
Letty Lind (W. & D. Downey, c. 1894)

Letitia Elizabeth Rudge (21 December 1861 – 27 August 1923), known professionally as Letty Lind, was an English actress, singer, dancer and acrobat, best known for her work in burlesque at the Gaiety Theatre, and in musical theatre at Daly's Theatre, in London.

== Life and career ==
Lind was born at her parents' residence in Birmingham, England, and was christened at Saint Thomas church. Her father, Henry Rudge, was a brass founder and chandelier maker. Her mother, Elizabeth Rudge, was an actress whose career was brief and confined mostly to the Birmingham area. Lind was one of the Rudge Sisters, all of whom became well-known performers. Lind also had two brothers who were brass founders.

=== Early career ===
Lind first appeared on stage when she was about five years old as Eva in Uncle Tom's Cabin, then toured with American entertainer and writer Howard Paul and his British wife, Mrs Howard Paul from about the age of ten. The Pauls billed her as "La Petite Letitia." Howard Paul became Lind's lover and fathered two illegitimate children by her: a girl who died in infancy (1878) and a son (Henry Horace Howard Paul Rudge (1880–1969), a tobacco merchant). Lind made her first London appearance under the name "Letty Lind" in Howard Paul's farce, Locked Out at the Princess's Theatre in 1879. In 1881, Lind left Paul's company. It is not clear exactly when their relationship ended, but Paul married Florence Kate Arthur in 1889.

After leaving Paul's company, Lind appeared in London and the British provinces for over twenty years in comedy, farce and pantomime. Lind's first appearance at the Gaiety Theatre was in December 1880 as a background performer in The Nine Days' Queen by Robert Buchanan. In 1882, she played at the Olympic Theatre in The Exiles of Erin, and in Little Miss Muffet at the Criterion Theatre. She returned to the Gaiety in 1882 in A Madcap Prince. She spent much of the next year at Her Majesty's Theatre in a revival of Jacques Offenbach's Le voyage dans la lune (A Trip to the Moon). She continued to tour the UK for the next few years in Robert Buchanan's drama Storm Beaten, the pantomime Queen of Hearts and George Faucett Rowe's Fun in Bristol, among other shows.

Lind performing a skirt dance in 1890

In 1887, Lind began her long and successful association with George Edwardes at the Gaiety Theatre in a series of burlesques, beginning with Monte Cristo Jr., taking over the role of Mariette, which was created by Lottie Collins. Collins devised her own cross between skirt dancing and the Can-Can in her performance of her hit song 'Ta-ra-ra-boom-de-ay'. It was around this time that Lind fans began to number in the "tens of thousands" as her fame was spreading. Later in 1887, Lind played in Miss Esmeralda at the Gaiety. She was on loan to Augustus Harris's company at the Theatre Royal, Drury Lane for the Christmas pantomime, playing the princess in Puss in Boots. With George Edwardes's London Company, she spent most of 1888 and part of 1889 in Australia and the United States. Back in London, she appeared in Ruy Blas and the Blasé Roué (1889), played Mercedes in Carmen up to Data (1890) and Euphrosynea in The Bride of Love (1890), where her cymbal dance was a highlight of the production, and the title role in Cinder-Ellen Up Too Late (1891). She also appeared in a number of charity events.

Around this time, Lind became famous as a skirt dancer. Skirt dancing, popularised by Kate Vaughn in the 1880s, was a huge craze until around 1910. It fused the grace of ballet with the footwork of step-dancing, which was considered common and lacking in grace. The dance depended on the dancer's skill in manipulating up to 12 metres of fabric in the skirt of her costume. Skirt dancing's advantage over ballet was that people could do it at home, and it became popular among all social classes. Lind was able to differentiate herself from other skirt dancers because she had the benefit of classical training that most of them did not, and she often added an acrobatic touch to the end of her dances. When she danced in America in 1888, the critics were surprised to see a dancer who did not show her legs and breasts.

=== Musical comedy and later career ===
Lind as Maude in Morocco Bound

Lind as Iris in A Greek Slave

By 1892, burlesque was losing popularity, and musical comedy was taking over the London stage. Though Lind's singing voice was limited, it was said to be pretty, and she used it to its best advantage, becoming a popular musical comedy performer.

Lind's first musical comedy role was at the Shaftesbury Theatre as Maude in Morocco Bound (1893). Morocco Bound was a great success. It was transferred to the Trafalgar Square Theatre in January 1894, and continued to run for a total of 329 performances. During the run of Morocco Bound, Lind published a short story in The Pelican. It was the tale of how a dancer coped during a performance when her petticoat string broke. In 1894 she wrote the music for a song, "Dorothy Flop", that her sister Adelaide Astor performed in a production of The Lady Slavey. The lyrics were written by Adrian Ross. She then played in Pick-me-up (1894, with George Grossmith, Jr. and Jessie Bond).

After this, Lind rejoined George Edwardes's management to star at Daly's Theatre in a series of hit musicals: A Gaiety Girl (1894, as Alma Somerset), Go-Bang (1894, as Di Dalrymple), An Artist's Model (1895, as Daisy Vane), The Geisha (1896, as Molly Seamore), and A Greek Slave (1898, as Iris). Lind received excellent reviews for her roles in these musicals, emphasising the grace of her dancing, her comic acting, her enunciation and her abilities at mimicry and imitation. Lind continued to appear at benefits, including ones for Edmund Payne and Nellie Farren, and in her own music hall shows, singing her repertoire from her famous roles. She sang in the music halls for only a few months. In 1899, Lind is believed to have made her only appearance at the Palace Theatre, London, in a programme celebrating Charles Morton's 80th birthday. That same year, she again performed the princess in the pantomime Puss in Boots, this time at the Garrick Theatre.

Lind also played Clotide in The Gay Pretenders by George Grossmith, Jr. at the Globe Theatre (1900) and Ellen in The Girl from Kays at the Apollo Theatre (1902), her last performance in a West End show. In 1903, Lind returned to the stage to try her luck again in the music halls. Lind made her final public appearance at the Gaiety Theatre, singing one of her first hits, "Listen to my tale of woe" from Ruy Blas. It was part of the last-night performance at the Old Gaiety, which was demolished soon afterwards. She retired from performing at the age of 41.

=== Last years and family details ===
Lind spent the rest of her life in Slough, England, living a peaceful life on the farm. Lind was the best known of the five Rudge Sisters. Sarah Rudge, professionally known as "Millie Hylton" (1870–1920), worked in the theatre and the music halls making a name for herself as a male impersonator. Elizabeth Rudge, a West End actress professionally known as "Adelaide Astor" (1873–1951), married George Grossmith, Jr. in 1895. Lydia Rudge, professionally known as "Lydia Flopp" (1877–1963), appeared in pantomimes. The youngest Rudge Sister, Fanny Rudge, had a long and successful career in Australia under the name "Fanny Dango" (1878–1972).

Besides her son with Howard Paul, she had another son, John R. H. Rudge (b. 1892), whose father was acknowledged to be the third Earl of Durham. It is not clear when her relationship with Durham began, but it is clear that it continued throughout her life. Lord Durham wanted to marry Lind, but was unable to do so because of the divorce laws. His wife had been in an insane asylum for years, and he was unable to break his marital ties to her.

Lind died at her residence at Brookside, Salthill, Slough, at the age of 61, having become ill rather suddenly that year. Her obituary from The Times said, "She was very pretty; she was very graceful; there was something appealing about her which might almost be called childish. She had a queer and very attractive little croak in her voice, and an elementary, little-girlish way of saying things which made them peculiarly engaging, and caused her saying of them to stick in the memory with a permanence which their wit or point might by no means justify. Add to this the enchanting lissomeness and beauty of all such movements as she was mistress of, and a stage personality (as we call it) which was like no one else's, and there is more than justification for the glow which the remembrance of her performances kindles." Lind's funeral took place at St. Mary's Church, Slough, on Friday, 31 August 1923, and she was buried in Windsor Cemetery.
