= Marion Hood =

English soprano and actress (1854–1912)

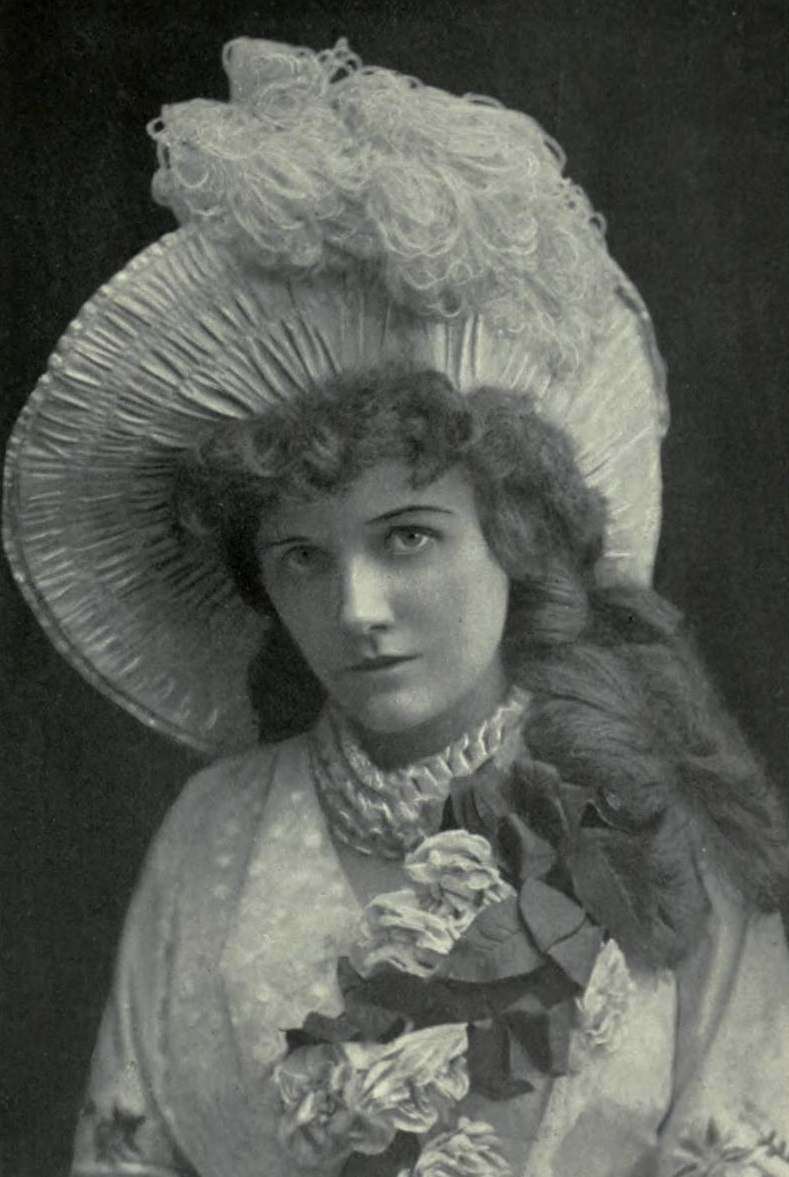
Marion Hood

Marion Hood (1 April 1854 – 14 August 1912) was an English soprano who performed in opera and musical theatre in the last decades of the 19th century. She is perhaps best remembered for creating the role of Mabel in Gilbert and Sullivan's The Pirates of Penzance in London.

== Early life and career ==
Hood was born Sarah Ann Isaac in Liverpool on 1 April 1854. She was a music hall performer as a child by the age of 11 under the name Marion Isaac. She married a Mr. Hunt of the Alhambra Palace Music Hall in Kingston upon Hull. In 1876, she had moved to London to study singing at the Royal Academy of Music. Her husband had died by 1880.

Hood as Mabel in The Pirates of Penzance

In 1880 she made her London stage debut at the Opera Comique, joining the D'Oyly Carte Opera Company and creating the role of Mabel for the London production of The Pirates of Penzance. According to her colleague Rutland Barrington, Hood was "a perfect picture to look at and equally pleasant to listen to ... tall, slight, and graceful, a typical English girl with a wealth of fair hair, which I believe was all her own. Her singing of the waltz song, 'Poor Wandering One', was quite one of the features of the first act [of Pirates]." The New York Times wrote that she had "a soprano voice of rare flexibility and power."

After that engagement, Hood left the company and married her second husband, Mr. Hesseltine, taking a brief break from performing until August 1881, when she appeared as Constance in the first production of Stephens and Solomon's Claude Duval at the Olympic Theatre, with George Power who had been her partner as Frederic in Pirates. She then sang at the Alhambra Theatre and Avenue Theatre, performing in Frederic Clay's Golden Ring and Karl Millöcker's The Beggar Student. After this, she toured the British provinces in grand opera, appearing as Marguerite in Faust, in which role she then appeared at the Crystal Palace.

== Later years ==

Hood next appeared in Billee Taylor at the Gaiety Theatre in 1885 and Little Jack Sheppard in 1885–86. She then created the title role in B. C. Stephenson and Alfred Cellier's hit Dorothy beginning in 1886, playing in the show for a total of 350 performances, interrupted by her illness; she was replaced in the cast by Marie Tempest, but returned to the role in 1887. In the meantime, and afterwards, she returned to the Gaiety to star in such burlesques as Monte Cristo Jr. (1886), Miss Esmeralda (1887), Frankenstein, or The Vampire's Victim (1887–88) and Ruy Blas and the Blasé Roué (1889). She toured America on two occasions with Gaiety companies during the period 1888–90).

In 1891, Hood returned to London in a burlesque of Joan of Arc, or the Merry Maid of Orleans (by Adrian Ross and J. L. Shine). A reviewer wrote, "Miss Marion Hood makes an attractive Joan of Arc, sings the airs allotted to her so as to win plenty of applause, and only fails where the delivery of certain declamatory speeches overtaxes the strength of her voice." She also toured in Australia in 1892 in Carmen up to Data among other things. She played a member of the public in Trial by Jury at the Nellie Farren benefit in 1898; this may have been her last appearance on the London stage.

According to historian Michael Walters, Hood "had a bitterly unhappy life, though this was never reflected in her stage performances." She died in Thanet, Kent, on 14 August 1912 at the age of 58.
