= Arthur Williams (actor) =

English actor and singer (1844–1915)

Williams as Corporal Bundy in The Red Hussar

Arthur Williams (9 December 1844 – 15 September 1915) was an English actor, singer and playwright best remembered for his roles in comic operas, musical burlesques and Edwardian musical comedies. As a playwright, Williams wrote several farces as well as some dramas.

Born in Islington, London, Williams initially went into business as a law stationer but soon left to take up acting in 1861 when he was 17. He travelled to Gravesend, Kent, where he made his stage début as Alfred Martelli in "The Corsican Brothers". He made his London stage debut at the St James's Theatre in 1868, where his roles included Thomas in The Secret, Baron Factotum in a burlesque of Sleeping Beauty, and Moses in The School for Scandal. After playing in dramas in the 1870s, he appeared in comic operas in the 1880s, in which he created the roles Sir Mincing Lane in Billee Taylor, Sir Whiffle Whaffle in Claude Duval, Amaranth CVIII in Lord Bateman, his most famous role, Lurcher in Dorothy and Corporal Bundy in The Red Hussar.

In the last decade of the century, he appeared in The Shop Girl, The Circus Girl and A Message from Mars, by Richard Ganthony, among others. In 1902, he began a long association with the hit musical A Chinese Honeymoon and went on to appear in a further six musicals and plays including The Belle of Mayfair (1906) and A Waltz Dream (1908). Later roles included Cornelius Scroop in The Girl in the Train in 1910 and Touchstone in As You Like It the following year. One of his last roles was in 1914 as Perkyn Middlewick in Our Boys. He died the following year at the age of 70.

== Biography ==
as Lurcher in Dorothy, from The Sketch, 1894

=== Early life ===
Arthur Williams was born in Islington. He was married to Emily Spiller and had a brother, Fred, who was also engaged in theatre and music hall. His nephew was the comic film actor Fred Emney. Williams first went into business as a law stationer before beginning his stage career.

=== Early acting career ===
His first role was in 1861 as Alfred Martelli in "The Corsican Brothers" in Gravesend, in northwest Kent, England, at the age of 17. In 1867, he appeared in The Carpenter of Rouen, by Joseph Stevens Jones and a stage version of Oliver Twist by Charles Dickens. After performing in local performances for seven years, he finally made his London stage debut at the St James's Theatre in 1868, where he played such roles as Thomas in The Secret, Baron Factotum in a burlesque of Sleeping Beauty, and Moses in The School for Scandal. In 1871 he played at the Royalty Theatre in Nell Gwynne, among other works. In 1875, he played Hoyley Smayle in Sentenced to Death, a drama by George Conquest and Henry Pettit. This was followed in 1876 by Jonas Isaacs in Queen's Evidence, a drama by George Conquest and H. Pettit. In 1877, he played Toby Daggs in During her Majesty's Pleasure, a drama by Conquest and Pettit.

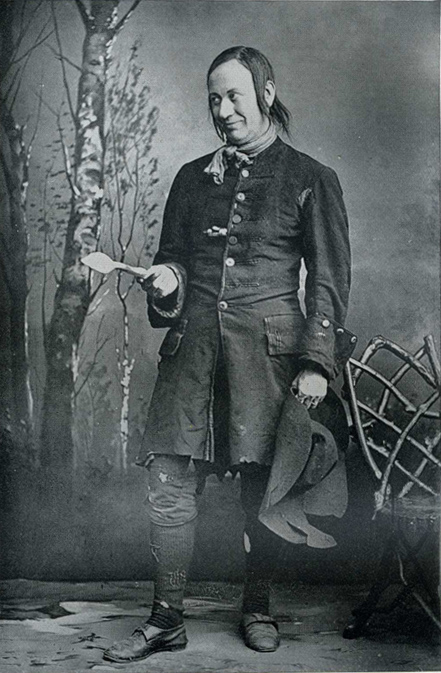
Another photo as Lurcher

In 1880, at the Imperial Theatre, he created the role of Sir Mincing Lane in the comic opera Billee Taylor, beginning a string of roles in works by Edward Solomon and Henry Pottinger Stephens. In 1881, at the Olympic Theatre, he created Sir Whiffle Whaffle in another Solomon and Stephens opera, Claude Duval. At the Gaiety Theatre, in 1882, he created the role of Amaranth CVIII in Solomon and Stephens' Lord Bateman. In 1883, he played Prospero in Ariel, a burlesque by F. C. Burnand. In early 1886, he played the title role in a burlesque, Oliver Grumble.

Williams' first big success, and likely his most celebrated role, was William Lurcher, which he created in the record-setting hit comic opera Dorothy, beginning in 1886. In 1888, he appeared in The Spitalfields Weaver by Thomas Haynes Bayly. At the Gaiety Theatre, in 1889, he played Bardell V. Pickwick in Dickens' stage adaptation of his novel, The Pickwick Papers. At the Britannia Theatre in 1889, he appeared in The Harvest Storm, by Colin Henry Hazlewood. Also in 1889, at the Lyric Theatre, he created the role of Dinniver in Doris. The same year, he also played Octavius Dell in The Jackal, by E. B. Aveling, followed by Solomon and Stephens' The Red Hussar, in which he created the role of Corporal Bundy.

Back at the Gaiety, in 1890, Williams played Captain Ziniga in Carmen up to Data. In 1891, he played as Sir Ludgate Hill in another Gaiety burlesque, Cinder Ellen up too Late. In 1892, at the Theatre Royal, Drury Lane, he played Tom Blinker in The Prodigal Daughter and appeared in Little Bo-Peep, Little Red Riding Hood & Hop O' My Thumb, by Augustus Harris and John Wilton Jones. In 1893, he played Dick Chilton in A Woman's Revenge, by Henry Pettit and Joshua Honeybun in Black Domino by Robert Buchanan and George Robert Sims.

=== Later years ===
From 1894–96, at the Gaiety, he created the role of Mr. Hooley in another hit, The Shop Girl, and Drivelli in The Circus Girl. In between, he played Bob Acres in The Rivals by Richard Brinsley Sheridan in 1895. From 1898 to 1901, he played at the Comedy Theatre with Sir Charles Hawtry in Lord & Lady Algy, The Cuckoo, as Penny in An Interrupted Honeymoon, by F. Kinsey Peile, and in the long-running A Message from Mars, by Richard Ganthony, among other works. In 1902, he portrayed Dudley Mortimer in The Broken Melody.

as Amaranth CVIII in Lord Bateman

In 1902, he began a run of 700 performances as Mr. Pineapple in the hit musical A Chinese Honeymoon. Following this, in 1904, he played Crookie Scrubs in Sergeant Brue. In 1905, at the Haymarket Theatre, he appeared in On the Love Path and at Drury Lane, he was Baron Bluff in the pantomime. In 1906, at the Vaudeville Theatre, he created the role of Sir John Chaldicott in The Belle of Mayfair and appeared there in 1907 in That Brute Simmonds. In 1908, at the Hicks Theatre, he was Joachim XIII in A Waltz Dream. He then played his old role of Lurcher in a revival of Dorothy. In 1909, at the Strand Theatre, he was Zopf in The Merry Peasant. 1910 saw him creating the role of Cornelius Scroop in The Girl in the Train. In 1911, he was Touchstone in As You Like It, Sir Walter Raleigh in The Critic and Percival in Sweet Nell of Old Drury by Paul Kester, touring in the latter until 1913. He then appeared as Master Blakey in Peg & the Prentice and in 1914 was Jaikes in The Silver King and Perkyn Middlewick in Our Boys. In 1914, Williams wrote a memoir about his years in the theatre.

Williams died the following year at the age of 70, having played over 1,000 roles in his career.

=== Playwriting career ===
As a playwright, Williams wrote several farces, including Leave it to Me (1872, with Colin Henry Hazlewood, in which Williams also appeared on stage), Funnibone's Fix (1892 at the Britannia Theatre, in which Williams also appeared on stage), and Oh! What a Day, as well as some dramas, including Christmas Chimes and The Secret of a Life.
