= Faust and Marguerite (opera) =

1855 English opera by Meyer Lutz

Faust and Marguerite is a romantic opera in three acts, dating from 1855, based on the Faust legend. The score was composed by Meyer Lutz. The libretto was written by Henri Drayton based on the Johann Wolfgang von Goethe play Faust. The 1900 film Faust and Marguerite is an adaptation of the play. It was directed by Edwin S. Porter, three years before he directed The Great Train Robbery.

== Sources ==
Banfield, Stephen (2001). "Lutz, Meyer". In Sadie, Stanley; Tyrrell, John (eds.). The New Grove Dictionary of Music and Musicians (2nd ed.). London: Macmillan Publishers. ISBN 978-1-56159-239-5.
