= Miss Esmeralda =

Victorian burlesque composed by Meyer Lutz and Robert Martin

Miss Esmeralda is a Victorian burlesque, in two acts, with music by Meyer Lutz and Robert Martin and a libretto by Fred Leslie, under his pseudonym "A. C. Torr", and Horace Mills. It is based on Victor Hugo's 1831 novel The Hunchback of Notre-Dame.

The piece premiered in 1887 at the Gaiety Theatre in London, starring Marion Hood in the title role, with Frank Thornton as Quasimodo and featuring E. J. Lonnen and Letty Lind.

== Background and production ==
John Hollingshead had managed the Gaiety Theatre from 1868 to 1886 as a venue for variety, continental operetta, light comedy, and musical burlesques. In 1886, Hollingshead ceded the management of the theatre to George Edwardes, whom he had hired in 1885. Fred Leslie wrote many of the theatre's pieces under his pseudonym, "A. C. Torr". Beginning with Little Jack Sheppard (1885), Edwardes expanded the format of the burlesques to full-length pieces with original music by Meyer Lutz, instead of scores compiled from popular tunes. These included Monte Cristo Jr. (1886); Frankenstein, or The Vampire's Victim (1887), Mazeppa, Faust up to Date (1888), Ruy Blas and the Blasé Roué (1888), Carmen up to Data (1890), Cinder Ellen up too Late (1891) and Don Juan (1892, with lyrics by Adrian Ross). In the early 1890s, as burlesque went out of fashion, Edwardes changed the focus of the theatre from musical burlesque to the new genre of Edwardian musical comedy.

Miss Esmeralda premiered on 8 October 1887 at the Gaiety, starring Marion Hood in the title role, with Frank Thornton as Quasimodo and featuring comedy star E. J. Lonnen and dancer Letty Lind. Percy Anderson designed the costumes. Fred Leslie and the theatre's leading actress, Nellie Farren, were away on tour. When they returned, the piece closed in December to make way for a new piece starring Leslie and Farren, Frankenstein, or The Vampire's Victim, which opened on 24 December 1887.

== Plot ==
Act I: A market in Paris

The gipsy Esmeralda is in love with the dashing young Captain Phoebus, who is, unfortunately, engaged to the fierce Fleur-de-Lis. Esmeralda has inadvertently also captivated a monk, Claude Frollo, and the hunchback Quasimodo. Frollo vengefully stabs Corporal Gringoire and tries to frame Esmeralda with the crime; she is arrested.

Act II: A prison and a court of justice in Paris

Quasimodo visits Esmeralda in prison and vows to help her, assuring her that he can establish her innocence. Frollo says that he will liberate her if she agrees to marry him. At her trial, Frollo is the prosecutor, and Phoebus is counsel for the defence. Esmeralda's innocence is proved the apparition of Gringoire, which is produced by Quasimodo.

== Roles and original cast ==
- Clopin – Leo Stormont
- Claude Frollo – E. J. Lonnen
- Quasimodo – Frank Thornton
- Corporal Gringoire – George Stone
- Belvigne – E. W. Colman
- Captain Phoebus – Fannie Leslie
- Ernest – Ada Blanche
- Esmeralda – Marion Hood
- Madame Gondelarieur – Emily Miller
- Fleur-de-Lis – Letty Lind
- Zillah – Addie Blanche
- Female Warders – Maud Richardson and Marie de Braham

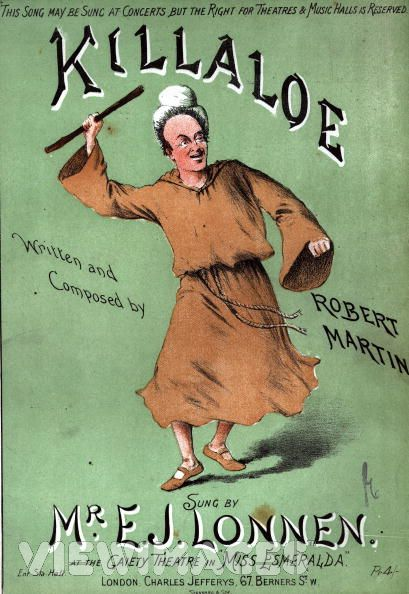
Sheet music cover for "Killaloe"

== Musical numbers ==
- Only a Gypsy Girl – Esmeralda
- His for evermore – Esmeralda
- The Noble Born – Clopin
- Killaloe – Frollo
- Convicts – Chorus
