= Henry Pottinger Stephens =

English dramatist and journalist born c. 1851–1903

Stephens caricatured in Punch, 1881

Henry Pottinger Stephens (c. 1851 – 11 February 1903), was an English dramatist and journalist.

After beginning his career writing for newspapers, Stephens began writing Victorian burlesques in the 1870s in collaboration with F. C. Burnand and the composer Edward Solomon. Stephens and Solomon wrote several comic operas together that briefly rivalled the Savoy Operas in popular esteem, including Billee Taylor (1880) and Claude Duval (1881). He also collaborated with Meyer Lutz at the Gaiety Theatre on burlesques including Little Jack Sheppard (1885). He worked again with Solomon on one of the first pieces considered a musical comedy, The Red Hussar (1889). He also wrote novels, plays and pantomimes, and acted in some of these.

== Life and career ==
"Pot" Stephens was born in Barrow-on-Soar, Leicestershire. He started his career as a journalist, working for The Daily Telegraph and Tit-Bits, among others, and was the first editor of Topical Times. He began writing for the stage, and in 1873 his "comedietta" Rosebud's Rose was presented by an amateur company in Bournemouth. He wrote his first burlesque, Back from India, in 1879 under the aegis of German Reed's management at St. George's Hall. The piece, with music by Cotsford Dick, was judged a "decided success" by The Era. Stephens soon wrote lyrics for F. C. Burnand's burlesque of Rob Roy, Robbing Roy, at the Gaiety Theatre and collaborated with Burnand on a couple of other burlesques, Balloonacy, a New and Original Musical Extravaganza, with music by Edward Solomon, and The Corsican Brothers and Co, Limited.

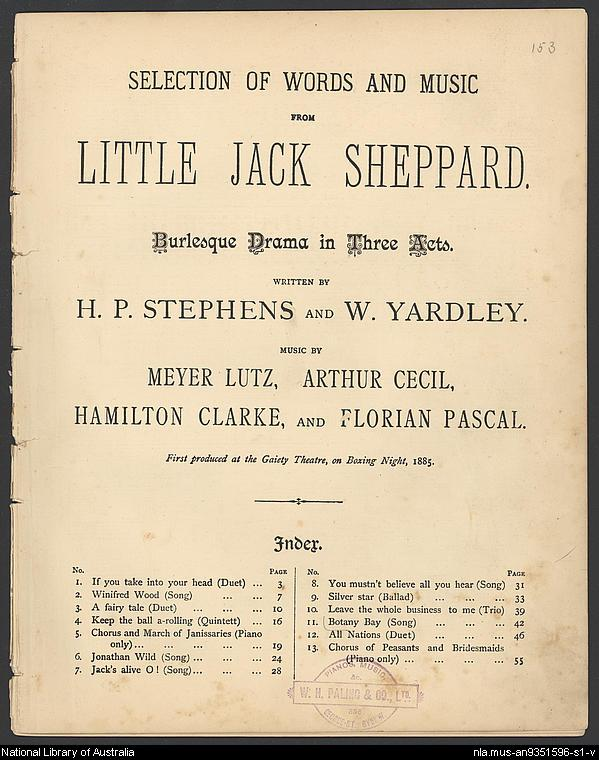
Sheet music to Stephens's Little Jack Sheppard

After Gilbert and Sullivan's H.M.S. Pinafore became a hit, Stephens was inspired to collaborate with Solomon on a comic opera, Billee Taylor (1880), which played in London at the same time as The Pirates of Penzance. Billee Taylor received favourable comparisons with Gilbert and Sullivan's piece in the press and caused its authors to be hailed briefly as the equals of Richard D'Oyly Carte's prized writing team. Solomon and Stephens also had a success in Claude Duval (1881). Carte produced successful tours of Claude Duval and Billee Taylor in America.

In 1882, Stevens obtained Anthony Trollope's permission to adapt the latter's novel, Doctor Wortle's School for the stage. In the same year Stephens married, but in 1887 his wife, Elizabeth Alice, divorced him for adultery. There were two children of the marriage. Also in 1882, Stephens and Solomon wrote two comic operas, Virginia and Paul, for the rising star Lillian Russell, and Lord Bateman for the Gaiety Theatre.

Stephens returned to burlesque with Galatea, or Pygmalion Reversed in 1883, with music by Meyer Lutz. In the same year he collaborated with the composer Florian Pascal on a comic opera, The Black Squire. Stephens had further successes with The Vicar of Wide-awake-field and Little Jack Sheppard (both 1885, with music by Lutz) under George Edwardes's management at the Gaiety Theatre.

In 1884, Solomon and Lillian Russell sued Stephens for libel, but by 1889 Solomon and Stephens were friendly enough to collaborate on a successful musical comedy, The Red Hussar (1889), starring Marie Tempest and Arthur Williams.

Stephens also wrote novels, plays, pantomimes, and an 1899 revue, A Dream of Whitaker's Almanack, with Walter Slaughter, Pascal, Georges Jacobi and Walter Hedgecock. He also acted in some of these.

Stephens died in London in 1903, aged 51.
