= Edward O'Connor Terry =

British actor (1844–1912)

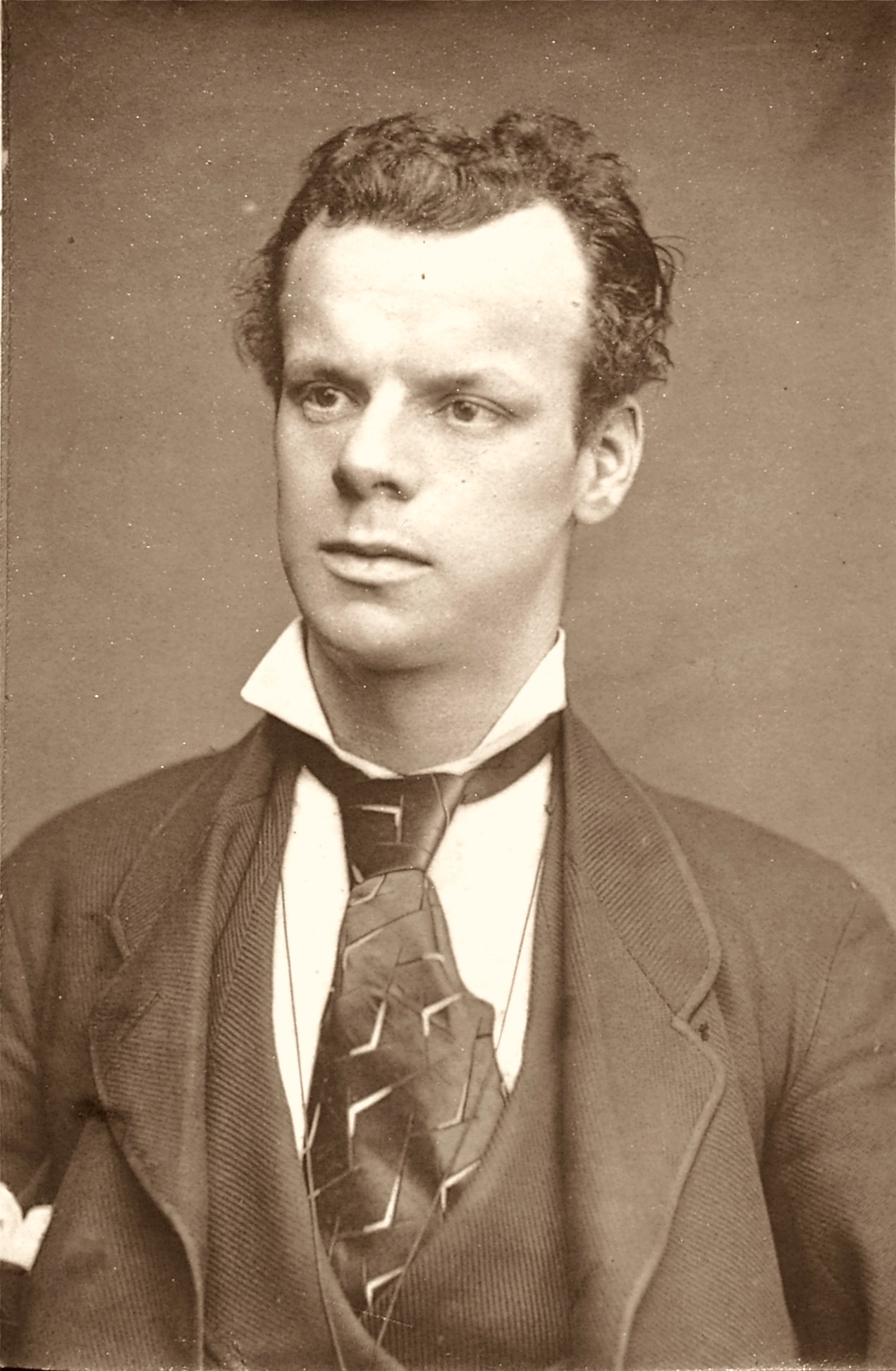
Edward O'Connor Terry

Edward O'Connor Terry (10 March 1844 – 2 April 1912) was an English actor, who became an influential actor and comedian during the Victorian era.

== Early life and career ==
Terry was born in Lambeth, London, the son of John Terry (1812–1851), an actor and painter, and his wife, Emblen Ann, née Middleton (baptised 1809 – 1892), a costumier. and made his debut in 1863 as Wormwood in The Lottery Ticket. He began his stage career in small companies in the provinces playing in Shakespeare with the young Henry Irving and sometimes in pieces employing his singing talents.

== Peak years ==
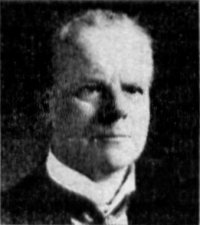
Terry, c. 1890

In 1867, Terry played for a season at London's Surrey Theatre in both comedy and drama. Between 1868 and 1875, he was the leading comedian at the Royal Strand Theatre in London. He reached the peak of his popularity after he joined John Hollingshead's company at the Gaiety Theatre, London in 1876, starring in the musical burlesques produced there during the next eight years. With Nellie Farren, Kate Vaughan and E. W. Royce, he made the fortune of this house, his eccentric acting and singing creating a style which had many imitators. Some of the roles in which he appeared there included Mephistopheles in Little Doctor Faust (1878).

Photo and signatures of Farren, Terry, Vaughan and Royce (standing) at the Gaiety

In 1887 he went into management, opening Terry's Theatre, built on the site of the old Coal Hole public house and music hall on the Strand. There, he produced and starred as Dick Phenyl in Arthur Wing Pinero's Sweet Lavender, which was perhaps his greatest success, running for 670 nights. He then revived Pinero's The Magistrate and The Times. In subsequent years, he was only occasionally seen at his own theatre and made many tours in the British provinces and in Australia, North and South America, South Africa and India. He returned to Terry's in 1890, producing and starring in King Kodak, The Blue Boar and several other notable productions. Terry brought four plays to New York in 1904. In this, his only Broadway engagement, he and his touring company played the former Princess Theatre on West 29th St. for eight weeks from December 1904 to February 1905, in The House of Burnside, Sweet Lavender, Love in Idleness, and The Passport.

== Personal life and death ==
Terry married twice; his first marriage, in 1870 was to Ellen Deitz. He married his second wife, Florence, Lady Harris, widow of Augustus Harris, in 1904. Off the stage, he was a Freemason and served on the councils of many charities and of public bodies.

Terry died of neuritis at his home in Barnes, England, at the age of 68.
