= Thespis (opera) =

1871 comic opera by Gilbert & Sullivan

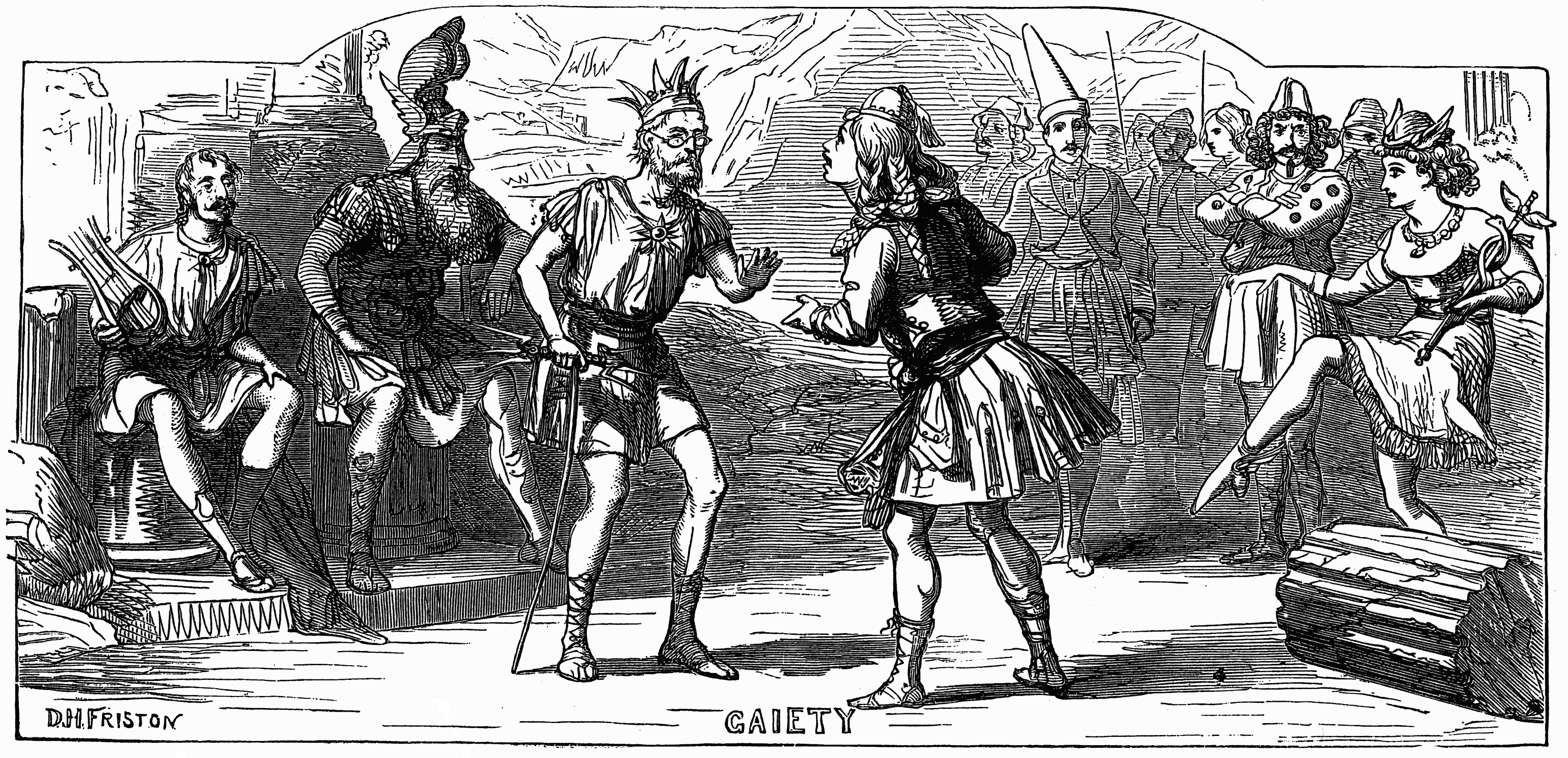
Illustration of Thespis by D. H. Friston from The Illustrated London News, 1872, shows Apollo, Mars, Jupiter, Thespis and Mercury (right)

Thespis, or The Gods Grown Old, is an operatic extravaganza that was the first collaboration between dramatist W. S. Gilbert and composer Arthur Sullivan. No musical score of Thespis was ever published, and most of the music has been lost. Gilbert and Sullivan went on to become the most famous and successful artistic partnership in Victorian England, creating a string of enduring comic opera hits, including H.M.S. Pinafore, The Pirates of Penzance and The Mikado.

Thespis premièred in London at the Gaiety Theatre on 26 December 1871. Like many productions at that theatre, it was written in a broad, burlesque style, considerably different from Gilbert and Sullivan's later works. It was a success, for a Christmas entertainment of the time, and closed on 8 March 1872, after a run of 63 performances. It was advertised as "An entirely original Grotesque Opera in Two Acts".

The story follows an acting troupe headed by Thespis, the legendary Greek father of the drama, who temporarily trade places with the gods on Mount Olympus, who have grown elderly and ignored. The actors turn out to be comically inept rulers. Having seen the ensuing mayhem down below, the angry gods return, sending the actors back to Earth as "eminent tragedians, whom no one ever goes to see". Gilbert would return to this theme twenty-five years later in his last opera with Sullivan, The Grand Duke, in which a theatre company temporarily replaces the ruler of a small country and decides to "revive the classic memories of Athens at its best".

Seasonal works like Thespis were not normally expected to endure, and apart from a benefit performance shortly after the original staging, Thespis was not performed again during its creators' lifetimes. A renewed interest in the piece began in the 1950s, and numerous productions have been performed since, either with music taken from Sullivan's other works, or with original music.

== Synopsis ==
=== Act I ===
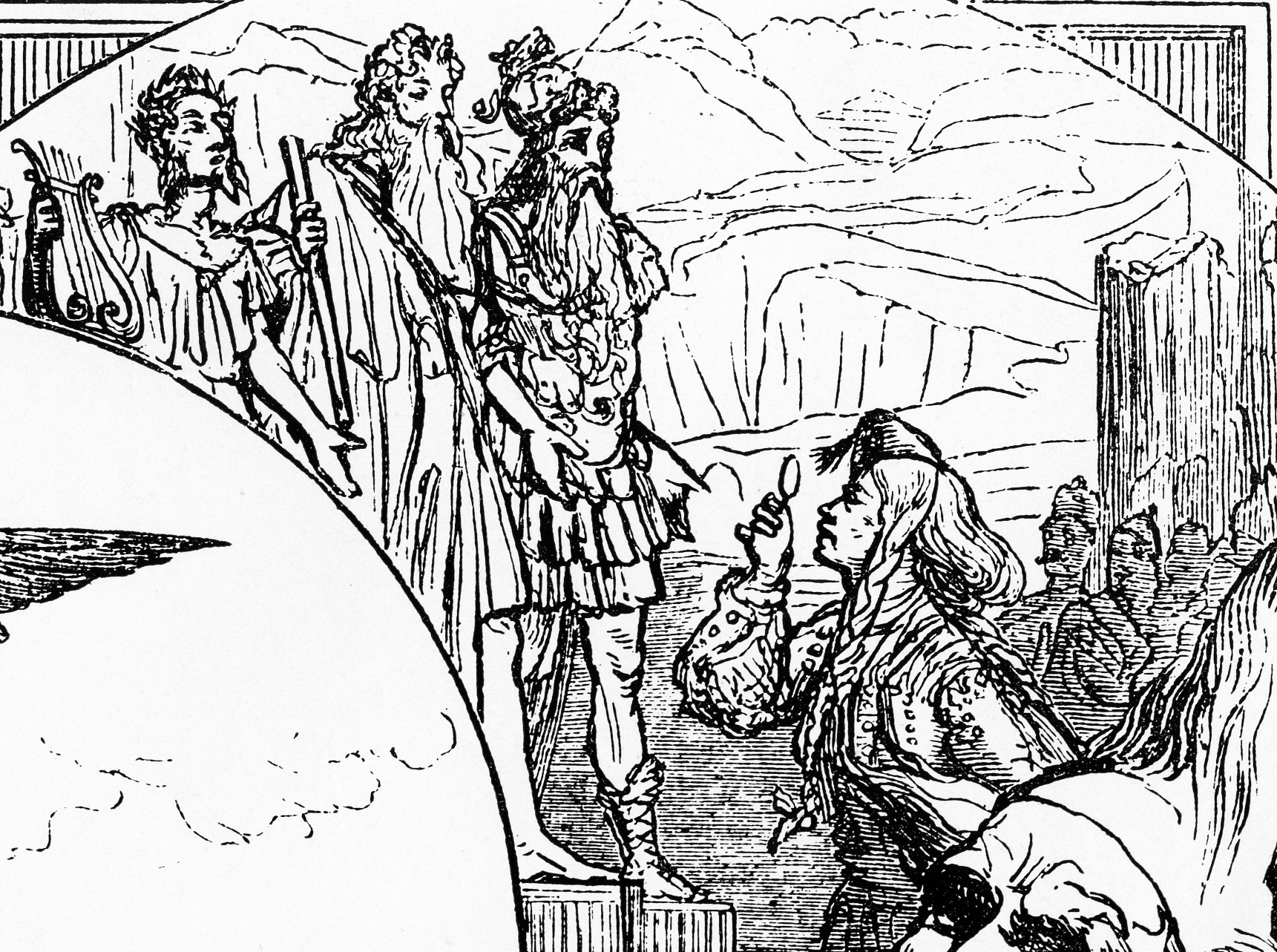
Thespis meets the gods – detail from a larger engraving.

Scene: A Ruined Temple on the Summit of Mount Olympus

On Mount Olympus, the elderly deities complain of feeling old and lament their waning influence on Earth. Mercury complains that the older gods are lazy and leave all their duties to him, while he gets no credit for all his drudgery. Jupiter says that matters have reached a crisis, but he is unsure what can be done about it. Just then, the gods see a swarm of mortals ascending the mountain and withdraw to observe them from a distance.

Thespis's acting company enters for a picnic celebrating the marriage of two of its members, Sparkeion and Nicemis. The actors, being cheap, have failed to contribute substantial food items to the picnic. Sparkeion flirts with his former fiancée, Daphne, which annoys Nicemis. In retaliation, Nicemis flirts with her old suitor, Thespis, but he declines to flirt back. Thespis explains to his troupe that a successful manager must be aloof from those he manages, or he will lose his authority.

Jupiter, Mars and Apollo enter. All of the actors flee in terror, except for Thespis. Jupiter asks Thespis whether he is impressed with the father of the gods. Thespis replies that the gods are unimpressive and suggests that they go down to earth in disguise to "mingle" and judge for themselves what people think of them. They agree to invest the actors with their powers, as they take a merry holiday below on Earth. Thespis agrees that he and his company will keep things running on Mount Olympus during the gods' absence. Each actor takes the place of one of the gods, with Thespis himself replacing Jupiter. Mercury stays behind to offer any advice the actors may need.

=== Act II ===
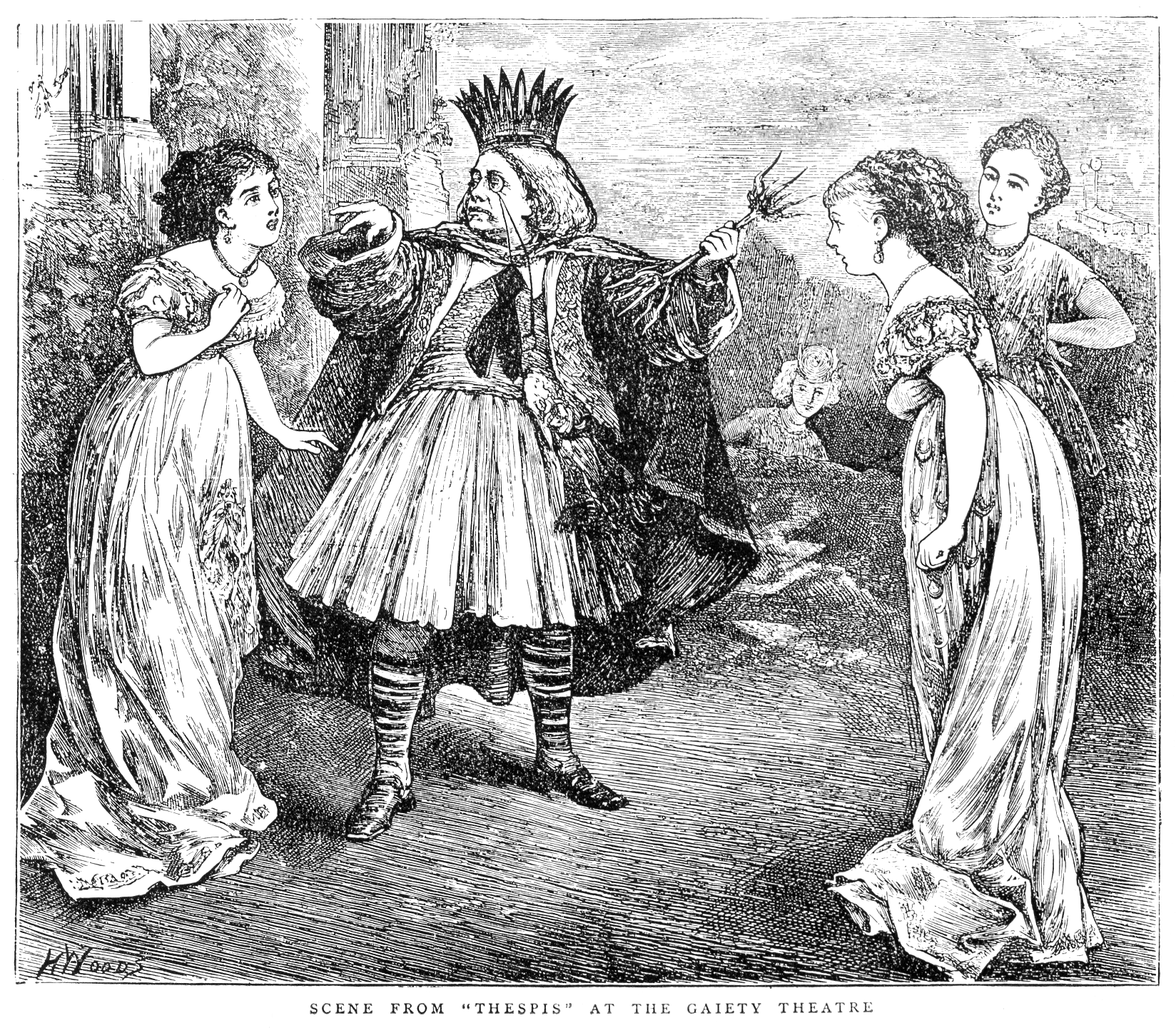
Thespis rules on whether Sparkeion is married to the woman that suits his mythological role, or the one he actually married.

The Same Scene, One Year Later, with the Ruins Restored

Under Thespis's direction, Olympus has been restored to its former splendour, and the Thespians enjoy ambrosia and nectar. Thespis's rule is very liberal, and he has advised his troupe not to "be hampered by routine and red tape and precedent". The celestial assignments, however, have caused some difficulties, as the romantic entanglements of the actors in real life conflict with those of the gods that they are playing. Venus, played by Pretteia, is supposed to be married to Mars, but the actor playing Mars is her father. A possible solution is discovered in Venus having actually married Vulcan, but Vulcan is her grandfather. Sparkeion, who took on the role of Apollo, accompanies his wife, Nicemis, who plays Diana, on her nightly duties, so that the sun is up during the night.

Mercury informs Thespis that the substitute gods have received many complaints from mortals because some are not performing their functions, and others' ill-judged experiments have wreaked havoc in the world below. For instance, Timidon, the replacement for Mars, is a pacifist and a coward; the substitute for Hymen refuses to marry anyone; and the ersatz Pluto is too tenderhearted to let anyone die. Daphne, who plays the muse Calliope, comes to Thespis and claims, based on a bowdlerised edition of the Greek myths, that Calliope was married to Apollo. She points out that Apollo, played by Sparkeion, is the brother of Diana (played by Sparkeion's wife, Nicemis). Thespis decides that Sparkeion is married to Daphne while they are gods, but his marriage to Nicemis will resume when they are mortals once again.

When the gods return, they are furious and tell Thespis that he has "deranged the whole scheme of society". Thespis says that they should calm down, as the list of mortals' complaints is about to be read. The gods watch incognito as Mercury presents the complaints: The actors have ruined the weather; caused strife among the nations; and there is no wine, since Bacchus is a teetotaller. After listening to these grievances, the gods angrily shed their disguises. The actors beg to stay on Olympus, but Jupiter punishes them for their folly by sending them back to earth cursed as "eminent tragedians, whom no one ever goes to see".

== Roles and original cast ==
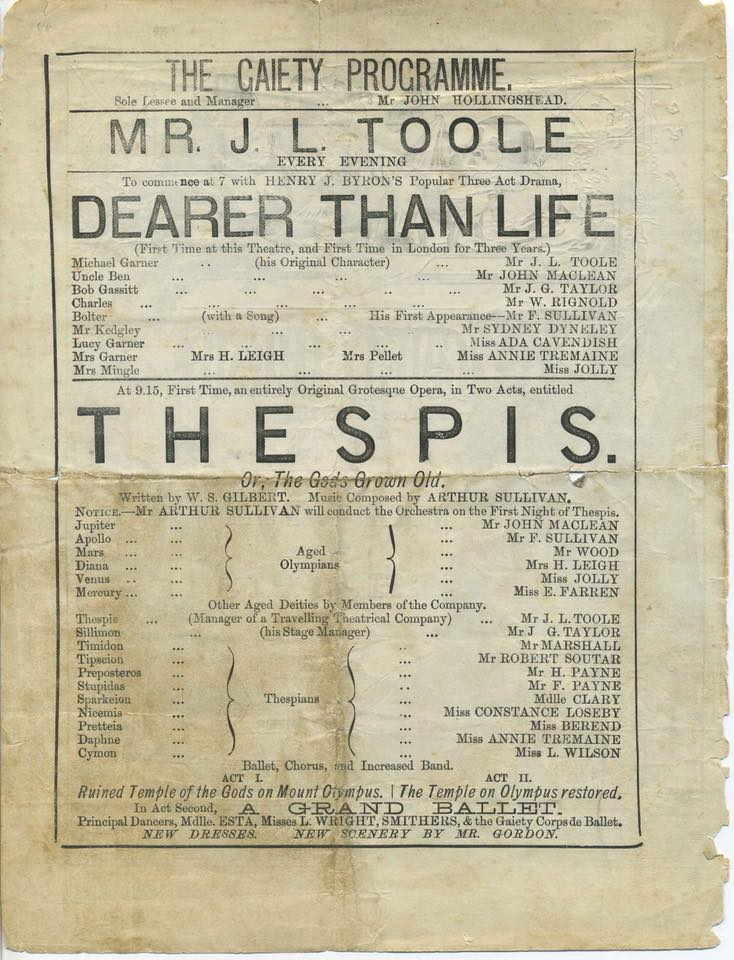
First night programme, 26 December 1871

Gods
Jupiter, Aged Deity – John Maclean
Apollo, Aged Deity – Fred Sullivan
Mars, Aged Deity – Frank Wood
Diana, Aged Deity – Mrs. Henry Leigh
Venus, Aged Deity – (Miss Jolly)
Mercury – Ellen "Nellie" Farren

Thespians
Thespis, Manager of a Travelling Theatrical Co. – J. L. Toole
Sillimon, his Stage Manager – J. G. Taylor
Timidon – Mr. Marshall
Tipseion – Robert Soutar (Nellie Farren's husband)
Preposteros – Harry Payne
Stupidas – Fred Payne
Sparkeion – Mlle. Clary (Real name: Jeanne-Marie-Madeleine-Poirel)
Nicemis – Constance Loseby
Pretteia – Rose Berend
Daphne – Annie Tremaine
Cymon – Lardy Wilson

Principal dancers: Mlle. Esta, Misses Lizzie Wright and Smithers

Chorus of aged deities and thespians; Gaiety Corps de Ballet

The first performance was conducted by Arthur Sullivan. Subsequent performances were conducted by Meyer Lutz, the theatre's musical director. In addition to playing Tipseion, the theatre's stage manager, Robert Soutar, stage managed the piece. The Ballet Master was W. H. Payne

== Background ==
=== Genesis ===
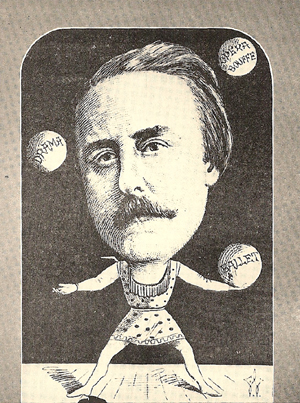
John Hollingshead had a lot of balls in the air: This engraving shows him juggling ballet, opéra bouffe, and drama.

Impresario and author John Hollingshead, the lessee of London's Gaiety Theatre since 1868, had produced a number of successful musical burlesques and operettas there. Indeed, Hollingshead "boasted that he kept alight 'the sacred lamp of burlesque.'" Gilbert and Sullivan were each well acquainted with the Gaiety and its house artistes. Gilbert's Robert the Devil (a burlesque of the opera Robert le Diable) had been on the programme on the theatre's opening night on 21 December 1868, with Nellie Farren in the title role, and played successfully for over 100 nights. Constance Loseby and Annie Tremaine (both of whom had roles in Thespis) were also in the cast of Robert, and Arthur Sullivan was in the audience on that opening night as one of Hollingshead's guests. It was a great success, "received with a storm of approbation". Less successfully, Gilbert had also written a play for the theatre in 1869 called An Old Score. Hollingshead would later say that the piece was "too true to nature". By late September or early October 1871, Gaiety programmes announced that "The Christmas Operatic Extravaganza will be written by W. S. Gilbert, with original music by Arthur Sullivan." There would be prominent roles for the popular comedian J. L. Toole, as well as Farren, the theatre's star "principal boy" in all of its burlesques.

How and when the pair came to collaborate on Thespis is uncertain. Gilbert was a logical choice for the assignment. With seven operas and plays premièring that year and over a dozen other burlesques, farces and extravaganzas under his belt, he was well known to London theatregoers as a comic dramatist. Sullivan, however, was at this point mainly known for his serious music. His completed music that year included the choral cantata On Shore and Sea, a suite of incidental music for Shakespeare's The Merchant of Venice, and numerous hymns, including "Onward, Christian Soldiers". He did have two comic operas to his credit, Cox and Box (1866) and The Contrabandista (1867), but the latter was four years in the past and had been unsuccessful. In September 1871, Sullivan had been engaged to conduct at The Royal National Opera, but it failed abruptly, leaving him unexpectedly without commitments. Hollingshead's offer of a role to his brother, Fred Sullivan, may have encouraged him to write the music for Thespis.

The production "aroused a great deal of interest and speculation". Ironically, it had "probably the largest audience" of any Gilbert and Sullivan première, as the Gaiety was the largest of the five London theatres at which their joint works premièred.

=== Composition ===
Gilbert had a busy autumn. His play On Guard had an unsuccessful run at the Court Theatre, opening on 28 October 1871, while his most successful play to date, Pygmalion and Galatea, opened on 9 December, only a few days before rehearsals for Thespis were to begin. Sullivan, however, had more time on his hands after a Manchester production of The Merchant of Venice, for which he supplied incidental music, had its première on 9 September.

Both Gilbert and Sullivan recalled that Thespis was written in some haste. Sullivan recalled, simply, that "both music and libretto were very hurriedly written". In his 1883 autobiography, Gilbert wrote:

Soon after the production of Pygmalion and Galatea I wrote the first of many libretti, in collaboration with Mr Arthur Sullivan. This was called Thespis; or, the Gods Grown Old. It was put together in less than three weeks, and was produced at the Gaiety theatre after a week's rehearsal. It ran eighty nights, but it was a crude and ineffective work, as might be expected, taking into consideration the circumstances of its rapid composition.

By 1902, Gilbert's recollection of the time frame had expanded to five weeks:

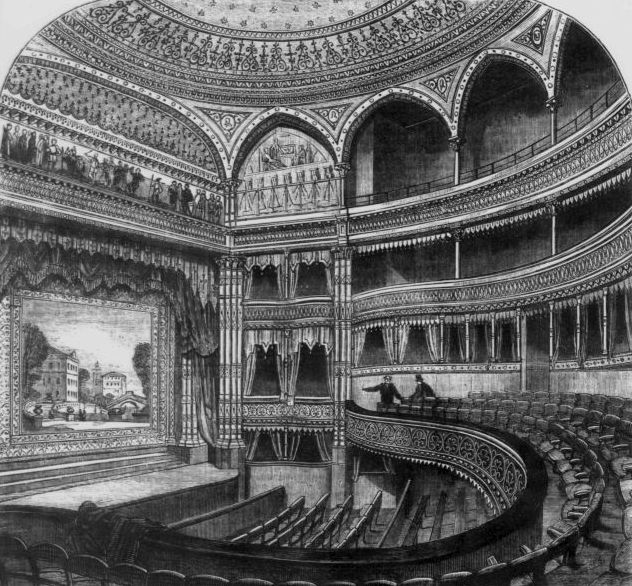
Interior of the Gaiety, 1869

I may state that "Thespis" was in no sense a failure although it achieved no considerable success. I believe it ran about seventy nights—a fair run in those days. The piece was produced under stress of tremendous hurry. It was invented, written, composed, rehearsed, and produced within five weeks.

Gilbert's five-week estimate is "in conflict with other apparently incontrovertible facts". Sullivan's nephew, Herbert Sullivan, wrote that the libretto was already in existence before his uncle became involved in the project: "Gilbert showed [Hollingshead] the libretto of an operatic Extravaganza Thespis, and Hollingshead forthwith sent it to Sullivan to set." Gilbert generally sketched out his libretti some months in advance of a production but did not write a finished libretto until he had a firm commitment to produce it. At the very least, a "rough draft of the plot" must have existed by 30 October, in light of a letter on that date from Gilbert's agent to R. M. Field of the Boston Museum Theatre, which reads:

At Xmas will be produced at the Gaiety Theatre, a new and original Opera Bouffe in English, by W. S. Gilbert, Esq., & Arthur Sullivan, Esq. does the new music. It is expected to be a Big Thing—and the purport of my present letter to you is—first—to send you (this day) rough sketch of the piece for your own reading, and secondly to ask you—if you care and will cause the piece to be rightly protected—with a view to sale in all places possible in the United States. ... Messrs. G. & S. are now hard at work on said piece.

Gilbert did, in fact, conclude an agreement with Field, and the first published libretto advised: "Caution to American Pirates.—The Copyright of the Dialogue and Music of this Piece, for the United States and Canada, has been assigned to Mr. Field, of the Boston Museum, by agreement, dated 7th December, 1871." If Field mounted the work, however, the production has not been traced. Gilbert's concern about American copyright pirates foreshadowed the difficulties he and Sullivan would later encounter with unauthorised "pirated" productions of H.M.S. Pinafore, The Mikado and their other popular works. In any case, the libretto was "published and circulated" in London in mid-December.

=== Production ===
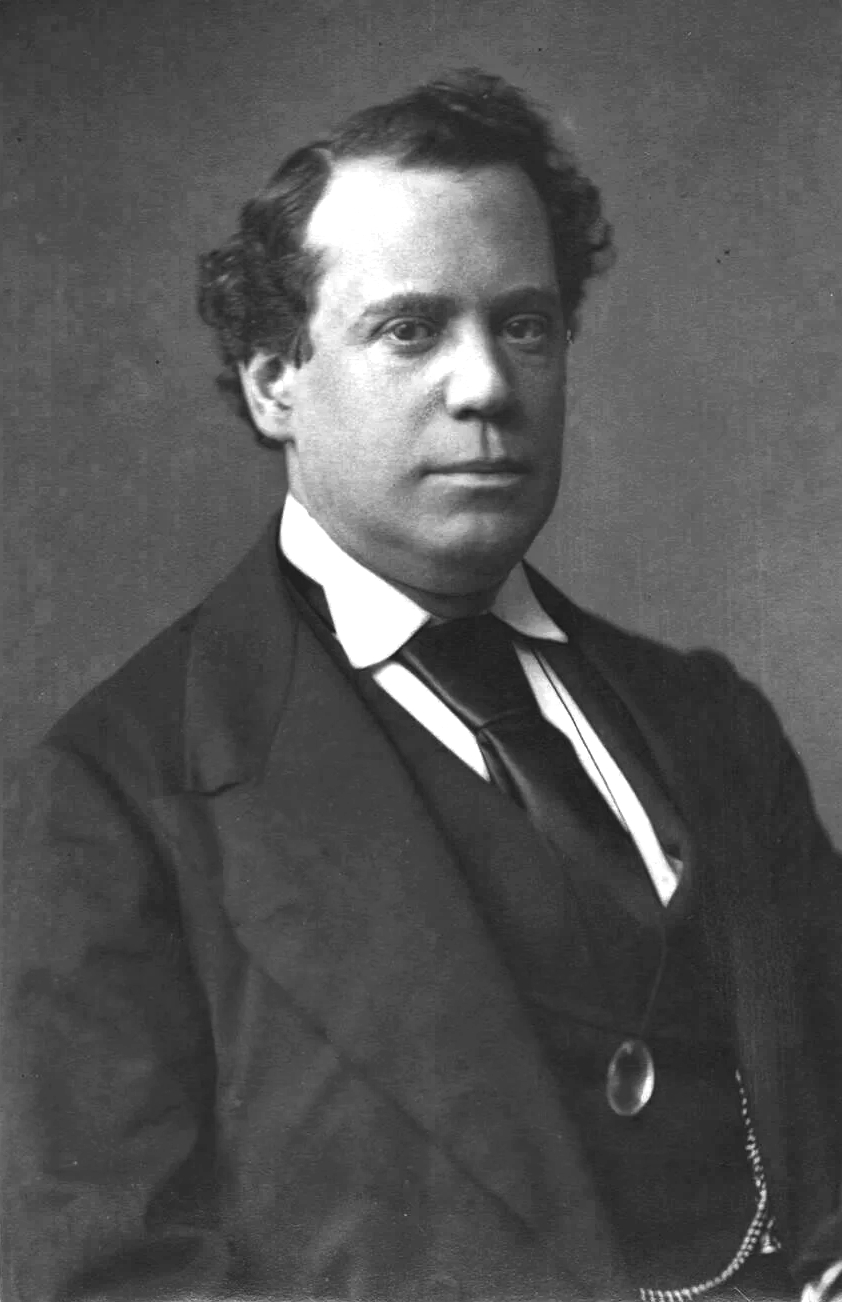
J. L. Toole, about 1874

With the piece set to open on 26 December, Gilbert first read the libretto to the cast on 14 December, but Toole, who was playing the central role of Thespis, did not return from a tour of the British provinces until 18 December. He then appeared in nine performances at the Gaiety in the six days immediately after his return, and other actors had similar commitments. In addition, Hollingshead had committed the company to perform a pantomime at The Crystal Palace on 21 December, which included many of the performers who would be in Thespis. Lastly, Thespis was to play as the afterpiece to an H. J. Byron comedy, Dearer than Life, which shared many of its actors, including Toole and Fred Sullivan, and had to be rehearsed at the same time.

Despite the short time available for rehearsals, Sullivan recalled that Gilbert insisted that the chorus play a major role, as it would do in their later Savoy operas:

Until Gilbert took the matter in hand choruses were dummy concerns, and were practically nothing more than a part of the stage setting. It was in 'Thespis' that Gilbert began to carry out his expressed determination to get the chorus to play its proper part in the performance. At this moment it seems difficult to realise that the idea of the chorus being anything more than a sort of stage audience was, at that time, a tremendous novelty. In consequence of this innovation, some of the incidents at the rehearsal of 'Thespis' were rather amusing. I remember that, on one occasion, one of the principals became quite indignant and said, 'Really, Mr. Gilbert, why should I stand here? I am not a chorus-girl!' to which Gilbert replied curtly, 'No, madam, your voice is not strong enough, or no doubt you would be.'

== Reception ==
=== Opening night ===
The première was under rehearsed, as several critics noted, and the work was also evidently in need of cutting: Gaiety management had advised that carriages should be called for 11:00 p.m., but Thespis was still playing past midnight. The Orchestra reported that "scarcely one player... was more than 'rough perfect' in his part." The Observer commented that "the acting, as well as the business, will want working up before it can be fairly criticized... the opera... was not ready". The Daily Telegraph suggested that "It is more satisfactory for many reasons to look upon the performance last evening as a full dress rehearsal.... When Thespis ends at the orthodox Gaiety closing hour, and the opera has been energetically rehearsed, few happier entertainments will be found."

Some critics could not see past the production's state of disarray. The Hornet captioned its review, "Thespis; or, the Gods Grown Old and WEARISOME!" The Morning Advertiser found it "a dreary, tedious two-act rigmarole of a plot... grotesque without wit, and the music thin without liveliness... however, not entirely devoid of melody.... The curtain falls before a yawning and weary audience." But others found much to admire in the work, despite the poor opening performance. The Illustrated Times wrote:

It is terribly severe on Mr. W. S. Gilbert and Arthur Sullivan, the joint authors of Thespis, that their work was produced in such a crude and unsatisfactory state. Thespis on its own merits—merits of literary worth, merits of fun, merits of song writing deserves to succeed; but the management has crippled a good play by insufficiency of rehearsals and a want of that requisite polish and aplomb without which these merry operas are useless. I must state, however, that Thespis is well worth seeing; and when it has been corrected and attracts the proper Gaiety audience, it will hold its own bravely. It is a pity, indeed, that such a play, so rich in humour and so delicate in music, was produced for the edification of a Boxing-Night audience. Anything would have done for such an occasion.... Unless I am very much mistaken, and despite the hisses of Boxing-Night... the ballads and wit of Mr. Gilbert [and] the pretty strains of Mr. Arthur Sullivan... will carry Thespis through and make it—as it deserves to be—the most praiseworthy piece of the Christmas season.

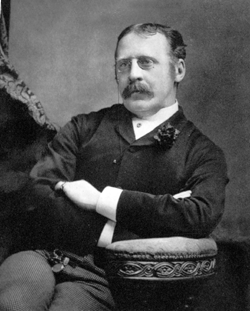
Critic Clement Scott

Clement Scott, writing in the Daily Telegraph, had a mostly favourable reaction:

Possibly a holiday audience is disinclined to dive into the mysteries of heathen mythology, and does not care to exercise the requisite intellect to unravel an amusing, and by no means intricate, plot.... Certain it is, however, that the greeting which awaited Thespis, or The Gods Grown Old, was not so cordial as might have been expected. The story, written by Mr. W. S. Gilbert in his liveliest manner, is so original, and the music contributed by Mr. Arthur Sullivan so pretty and fascinating, that we are inclined to be disappointed when we find the applause fitful, the laughter scarcely spontaneous, and the curtain falling not without sounds of disapprobation. Such a fate as this was certainly not deserved, and the verdict of last evening cannot be taken as final. Thespis is too good to be put on one side and cold-shouldered in this fashion: and we anticipate that judicious curtailment and constant rehearsal will enable us shortly to tell a very different tale.

The Observer commented: "[W]e have authors and musicians quite as talented as [the French]. ... The subject of Thespis is unquestionably funny. ... Mr. Arthur Sullivan has entered with heart into the spirit of Mr. Gilbert's fun, he has brightened it up with the most fanciful and delightful music".

=== Subsequent performances ===
Many writers in the early 20th century perpetuated a myth that Thespis ran only a month and was considered a failure. In fact, it remained open until 8 March. Of the nine London pantomimes that appeared during the 1871–72 holiday season, five closed before Thespis did. By its nature, the genre did not lend itself to long runs, and all nine had closed by the end of March. Moreover, the Gaiety normally only ran productions for two or three weeks; the run of Thespis was extraordinary for the theatre.

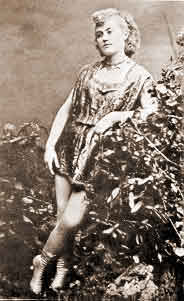
Mlle. Clary, the original Sparkeion, for whose benefit the last performance of Thespis with the original music was given

As they would do with all their operas, Gilbert and Sullivan made cuts and alterations after the first performance. Two days after the opening, Sullivan wrote to his mother, "I have rarely seen anything so beautiful put upon the stage. The first night I had a great reception, but the music went badly, and the singer sang half a tone sharp, so that the enthusiasm of the audience did not sustain itself towards me. Last night I cut out the song, the music went very well, and consequently I had a hearty call before the curtain at the end of Act II." The piece eventually settled into a respectable state, and later critics were much more enthusiastic than those on opening night.

Reporting on the opera's third night, a letter in the London Figaro stated: "[N]ot a single hitch in the performance is now to be perceived, and ... the applause and evident delight of the audience from beginning to end ... fully endorses the opinion of the Telegraph critic". On 6 January 1872, the Penny Illustrated Paper commented that "Mr. Gilbert's Gaiety extravaganza grows in public favour and deservedly so". On 9 January, the Daily Telegraph reported a visit by His Royal Highness, the Duke of Edinburgh. By 27 January, the Illustrated Times noted that "a chance playgoer will certainly not find a seat at the Gaiety.... Thespis can, after all, boast the success which was predicted". Land and Water reported on 3 February that "Thespis is now in capital working order."

Performances of Thespis were interrupted on 14 February 1872, Ash Wednesday, since London theatres refrained from presenting costumed performances out of respect for the religious holiday. Instead, a "miscellaneous entertainment" was given at the Gaiety, consisting of ventriloquists, performing dogs and, coincidentally, a sketch parodying a penny reading by the young George Grossmith, who, several years later, became Gilbert and Sullivan's principal comedian.

On 17 February, Henry Sutherland Edwards wrote in the Musical World: "In almost all conjunctions of music and words, there is a sacrifice of one to the other; but in Thespis... Sufficient opportunities have been given for music; and the music serves only to adorn the piece." Similar reports continued to appear through early March, when Thespis closed. The final performance during the authors' lifetimes was given less than two months later, on 27 April, at a matinée for the benefit of Mlle. Clary, the original Sparkeion. On such an occasion, a performer would normally choose a piece likely to sell well, as the beneficiary was entitled to the income (after expenses), and tickets were generally offered at "inflated prices". The actress was a Gaiety favourite, "not only in respect of her voice but also her delicious French accent and, of course, her figure." Others recalled "the charm of Mlle. Clary, with her pretty face and piquant broken English". She had been particularly successful as Sparkeion, and her song in Act II, "Little Maid of Arcadee", was the only one chosen for publication.

=== Aftermath ===
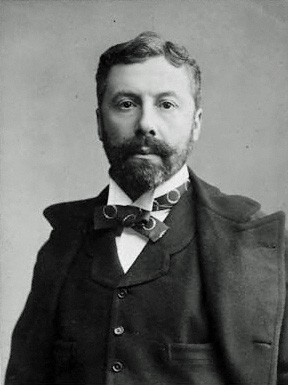
Richard D'Oyly Carte

After the production of Thespis, Gilbert and Sullivan went their separate ways, reuniting three years later, with Richard D'Oyly Carte as their manager, to produce Trial by Jury in 1875. When that work was a surprise success, there were discussions of quickly reviving Thespis for the 1875 Christmas season. Gilbert wrote to Sullivan:

They seem very anxious to have it and wanted me to name definite terms. Of course I couldn't answer for you, but they pressed me so much to give them an idea of what our terms would be likely to be that I suggested that possibly we might be disposed to accept two guineas a night each with a guarantee of 100 nights minimum. Does this meet your views, & if so, could you get it done in time. I am going to re-write a considerable portion of the dialogue.

The proposed revival was mentioned in several more letters throughout the autumn of 1875, until on 23 November Gilbert wrote, "I have heard no more about Thespis. It is astonishing how quickly these capitalists dry up under the magic influence of the words 'cash down'." In 1895, with Richard D'Oyly Carte struggling to rediscover success at the Savoy, he once again proposed a revival of Thespis, but the idea was not pursued. No mention of the whereabouts of the music of Thespis exists since 1897, and scholars have searched for it among many of the extant collections. Except for two songs and some ballet music, it is presumed lost.

The reasons why Thespis went unrevived are not known. Some commentators speculate that Sullivan used the music in his other operas. If this were true, then "for this reason alone a revival would have become impossible". However, evidence that Sullivan did so has eluded discovery. Another possible explanation is that Gilbert and Sullivan came to regard Thespis, with its "brazen girls in tights and short skirts", and broad burlesque-style humour, as "the kind of work they wished to avoid". They later renounced travesti roles and revealing dresses on their actresses, and made publicly known their disapproval of them. In 1885, Hollingshead wrote to the Pall Mall Gazette, "Mr. Gilbert is somewhat severe on a style of burlesque which he did much to popularise in the old days before he invented what I may call burlesque in long clothes. … Mr Gilbert never objected to the dresses in Robert the Devil nor to the dresses in Thespis."

In 1879, Sullivan, Gilbert and Carte were in the midst of a legal battle with the former directors of the Comedy Opera Company, which had produced H.M.S. Pinafore. Sullivan wrote to Hollingshead, saying: "You once settled a precedent for me which may just at present be of great importance to me. I asked you for the band parts of the Merry Wives of Windsor... and [you] said, 'They are yours, as our run is over....' Now will you please let me have them, and the parts of Thespis also at once. I am detaining the parts of Pinafore, so that the directors shall not take them away from the Comique tomorrow, and I base my claim on the precedent you set."

=== Modern productions ===
After its last performance at the Gaiety in 1872, Thespis appears to have remained unperformed until 1953, although an attempted reconstruction from the 1940s has been discovered. Tillett and Spencer, who discovered the ballet music, identified twenty separate reconstructions of Thespis between 1953 and 2002. About half of these use music adapted from Sullivan's other works; the others use new music for all but the surviving songs, or, in a few cases, re-compose those as well. No version has become predominant in recent productions.

Theatre historian Terence Rees developed a version of the libretto that attempts to correct the many errors noted in the surviving libretto. Rees also prepared a performance version, based on the libretto, which included a few interpolated lyrics from Gilbert's non-Sullivan operas in an attempt to replace the missing songs. A score was supplied by Garth Morton, based on music from lesser-known Sullivan operas, and this version has been recorded. A version with an original score by Bruce Montgomery (other than the two Sullivan numbers) has been performed several times, including in 2000 at the International Gilbert and Sullivan Festival. An original 1982 score by Kingsley Day has been used in several Chicago-area stagings. In 1996, another version with new music, by Quade Winter, was produced by the Ohio Light Opera.

In 2008, a Sullivan pastiche score (with some Offenbach added), arranged by Timothy Henty, was first used with Gilbert's libretto adapted by Anthony Baker, at the Normansfield Theatre in Teddington, Middlesex, England, the first professional British production since 1872. This was performed several times subsequently, including at the 2014 International Gilbert and Sullivan Festival. Also in 2008, an original score by Thomas Z. Shepard was first performed in concert by the Blue Hill Troupe in New York City and was finally given a fully staged amateur production in 2014.

== Assessment ==
=== More than the usual burlesque ===
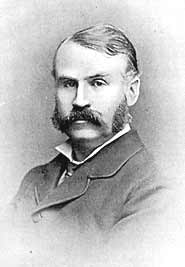
W. S. Gilbert in about 1871

Thespis was an advance on the types of burlesques to which Gaiety audiences were accustomed. François Cellier recalled much later:

I retain a dim recollection of witnessing the piece and being impressed with the freshness of Gilbert's libretto, especially as regards the lyrics, which were, indeed, a treat to read after the vapid, futile jingle of rhymes without reason which had hitherto passed muster on those degenerate days. To all play-goers it was a new "sensation" in musical plays. As for Arthur Sullivan's music, need I say how every number charmed and charmed again?

Several critics suggested that the piece may have been too sophisticated for its audience—or at least, the audience that greeted its first performance on Boxing Night. The Times wrote: "The dialogue throughout is superior in ability and point to that with which ordinary burlesque and extravaganza have familiarized us; so much so, in fact, that it was a daring experiment to produce such a piece on such a night. It met, however, with an excellent reception, and on any other occasion than Boxing Night the numerous merits of the piece cannot fail to secure for it in the public estimation a high place among the novelties of the season." Other reviews of the first night took up a similar theme: Sporting Life suggested that "It may be that they looked for something less polished than Mr. Gilbert's verse, and went for something broader and coarser than that delightful author's humour. It may be, too, that Thespis was a little—I only say, just a little—'over their heads'." The Orchestra carried a similar sentiment: "In fact, both music and idea were somewhat over the heads of the audience."

=== Libretto ===
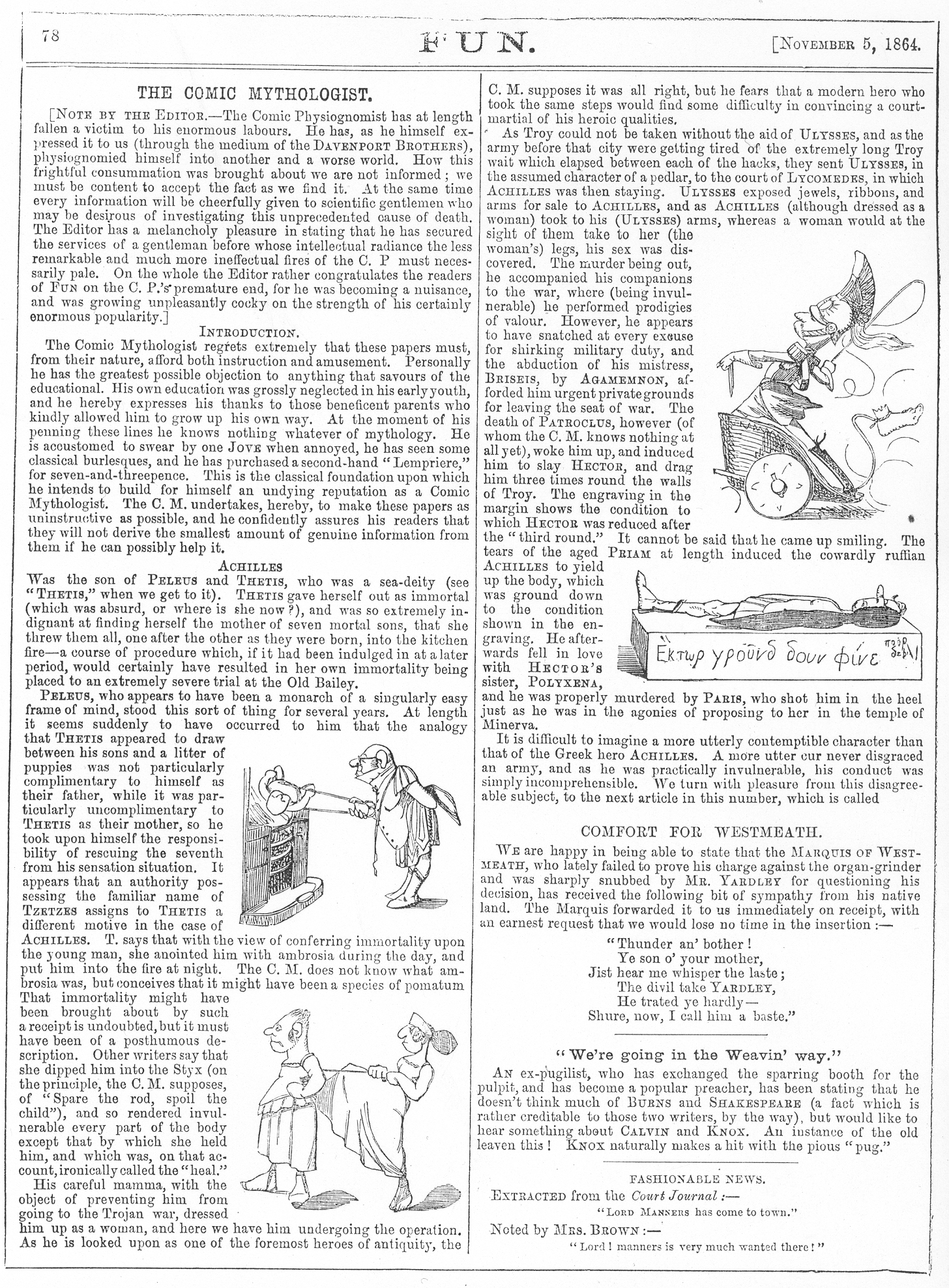
The first of Gilbert's "Comic Mythologist" articles in the illustrated magazine Fun

The plot of Thespis, with its elderly gods tired of their life in Olympus, is similar to some of Offenbach's operas, notably Orphée aux Enfers (Orpheus in the Underworld). In Orphée, like Thespis, classical mythology, particularly the Olympian gods, are ruthlessly parodied. In Thespis, the gods swap places with actors and descend to Earth; in Orphée, the gods head to hell for a pleasant holiday away from boring perfection. Offenbach's plot – for although Crémieux and Halévy wrote the libretto, the idea was Offenbach's – places Orpheus, the great musician, in the centre; however, Gilbert's plot focuses on Thespis, the Father of the Drama. While this may be a coincidence, it could also be seen as a response to Offenbach, as his plot places music at the centre of his operetta, but Gilbert's elevates the dramatist.

The libretto has been praised by several biographers and historians. One said that "The dialogue contains many an authentic Gilbertian touch." Another found it "a gay, sparkling libretto". Sidney Dark and Rowland Gray wrote that "the book of Thespis is genuine Gilbert, the Gilbert whom nowadays all the world loves.... Thespis once more emphasizes the fact that Gilbert's artistry was hardly affected with the passing of the years. Many of its songs might well have appeared in the later operas." They point out Mercury's "I'm the celestial drudge", which anticipates Giuseppe's "Rising early in the morning" in The Gondoliers, and find the "real brand of Gilbertian topsy-turvydom" in the song about the former head of a railway company, "I once knew a chap who discharged a function". Isaac Goldberg thought that "Thespis looks forward far more often than it glances backward: It forecasts the characteristic methods, and now and then a character, of the later series. Its dialogue is comical, and, if anything, somewhat above the heads of the Gaiety audiences of 1871."

Goldberg wrote in 1929 that the libretto "seems to have no specific ancestry.... neither in his burlesques nor in his ballads... had Gilbert played with the gods and goddesses of Greek mythology." However, Gilbert did write a series of humorous sketches parodying the Greek myths, mainly the heroes of the Iliad, for the illustrated magazine Fun in 1864, and Pygmalion and Galatea, which he produced just before Thespis, was a more serious treatment of Greek mythology. Jane W. Stedman points out that Thespis "looks backward to French opéra bouffe", but it is "fundamentally a Gilbertian invasion plot in which outsiders penetrate and affect a given society, often for the worse." She compares the theatrical company in Thespis to the politicians that remodel fairyland in Gilbert's 1873 play The Happy Land and the Englishmen who reform the island nation of Utopia in Utopia, Limited (1893). Elements of Thespis also appear in Gilbert and Sullivan's last opera together, The Grand Duke (1896), where a theatre company replaces the ruler and decides to "revive the classic memories of Athens at its best".

=== The music ===
Sullivan's score generally came in for praise, though critics carped—as they would throughout his life—that theatrical scores were beneath his ability. In the Standard, A. E. T. Watson wrote:

Mr. John Hollingshead... has judiciously called on Mr. W. S. Gilbert to furnish him with an original opera-extravaganza, and entrusted its musical setting to Mr. Arthur Sullivan. From the association of these two names the most pleasing result has for some weeks past been anticipated, which the success of last evening fully justified.... Mr. Gilbert in 'Thespis' has happily provided the composer with everything he could desire, mastering the character of opera-extravaganza, which precludes the exercise of the highest flights of genius of which a musician is capable and sets a limit to the exercise of his talents.

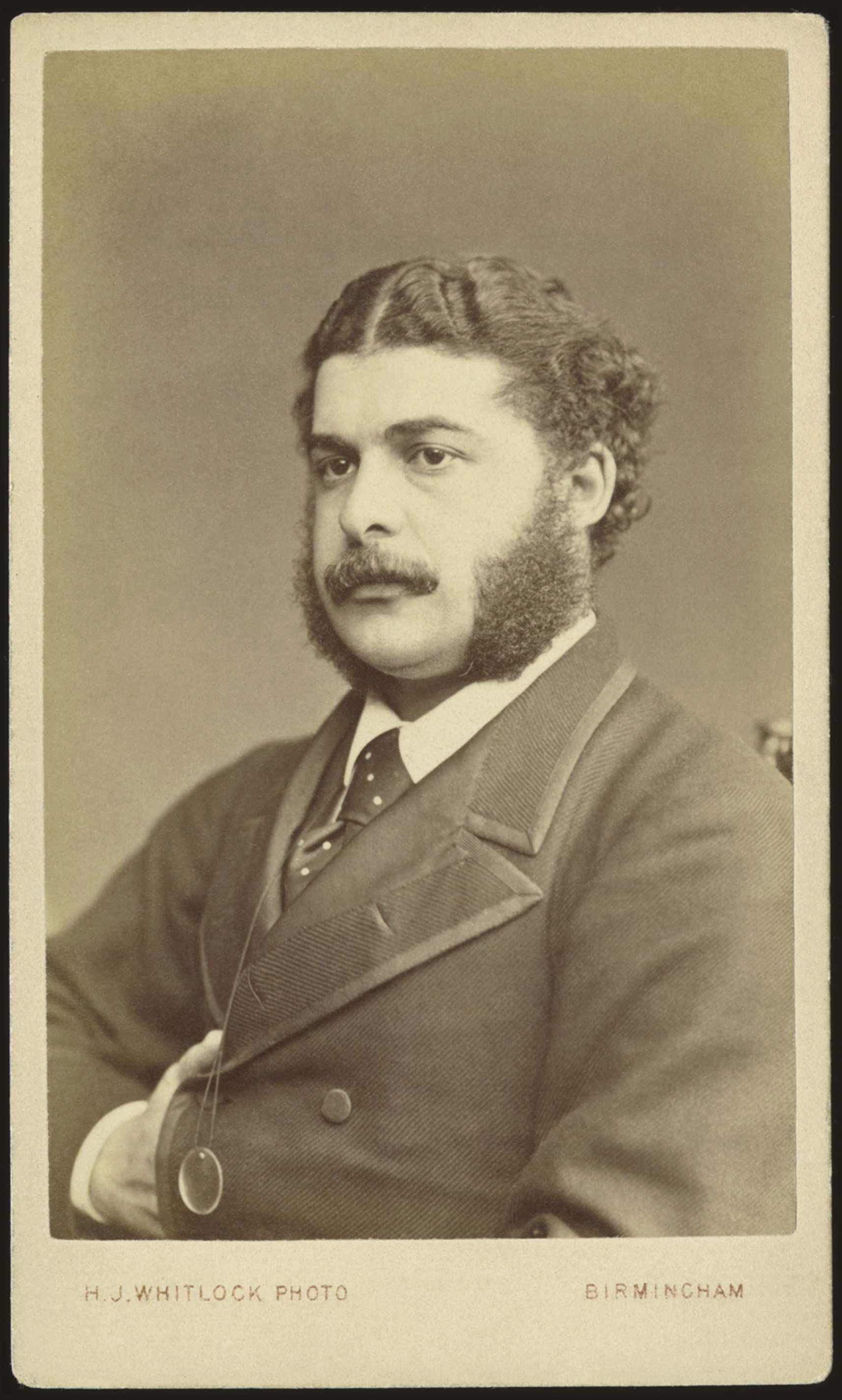
Arthur Sullivan in about 1870

Clement Scott in The Daily Telegraph found the opera "not marred by ambitious music". But he added, "Tuneful throughout, always pretty, frequently suggestive, the songs and dances are quite in character with the author's design.... Some of the numbers will certainly live, and the impression caused by the music as a whole is that it will have far more than a passing interest."

Many critics praised the originality of the title character's song in the first act about the head of a railway company, which may have been a joke about the Duke of Sutherland, "who was fond of running railway engines". Scott called the song a "ludicrous ballad", but "quite in the spirit of the well-known compositions of 'Bab,' and, as it has been fitted with a lively tune and a rattling chorus, a hearty encore was inevitable. Though the ditty was long, the audience would have been well content to hear it all over again." The Pall Mall Gazette found the orchestration "very novel, including, as it does, the employment of a railway bell, a railway whistle, and some new instrument of music imitating the agreeable sound of a train in motion." Similarly The Sunday Times noted, "The entire company join in the chorus, the music of which admirably expresses the whirl and thunder of a railway train at express speed." The Era called it "a screaming, whistling and shouting chorus [that] fairly brings down the house".

The similarity to French models was much commented upon. Vanity Fair thought that "the music in the piece itself is charming throughout, and promises for the first time a rival to Offenbach.... Thespis is quite as good as Orphée aux Enfers." Another wrote:

Mr. W. S. Gilbert and Mr. Arthur Sullivan have attempted, with not a little success, to imitate French comic opera, concerning which we have heard so much for the last half-dozen years.... In these days—when the French critics are savagely turning round on us, and calling us pickpockets—it is not disagreeable to find that we have authors and musicians quite as talented as our neighbours.... Mr. Sullivan has certainly persuaded us of one thing—that a musician can write to any metre.

The Morning Advertiser thought that "There is an evident attempt to copy the creations of a foreign composer who is so popular at the present time, and who has written some charming music for the gods and goddesses en bouffes." Others accused Sullivan of blatant copying. The Athenaeum wrote that the music "was arranged and composed by Mr A. S. Sullivan (the first verb was not in the bills as it ought to have been)". One critic thought that the duet for Sparkeion and Nicemis, "Here far away from all the world", was one of the "single best items of the piece". In 1873, the arranger Joseph Rummell (who had arranged Sullivan's Merchant of Venice score for the piano) wrote to Sullivan, asking about the song, with a view to publication. The composer replied, "Thespis is not published but if you like I will send you the Full Score of the Duet in question", but nothing came of it.

== Surviving music ==
Only three musical passages from Thespis are known to survive: the ballad "Little maid of Arcadee", the chorus "Climbing over rocky mountain", and the ballet music. The fate of Sullivan's score has long been a subject for speculation. In 1978, Isaac Asimov wrote a time travel story, "Fair Exchange?", which focused on a character travelling back to 1871 to rescue the score to Thespis before Sullivan could destroy it. But Sullivan is not known to have destroyed it, and the ballet, at least, was still available to be reused in 1897.

=== Little maid of Arcadee ===
Little Maid of Arcadee
Recording of "Little maid of Arcadee" from Thespis

Sparkeion's song in Act II, "Little maid of Arcadee", was the only number from the opera to achieve contemporaneous publication. It was one of four numbers to be encored on the first night. The Daily Telegraph wrote: "With the public no doubt the musical gem will be a ballad called 'Cousin Robin'—pathetic and tender words, with a dreamy and somewhat Gounodish air. So sweetly was this sung by Mdlle. Clary that another encore was inevitable." The Observer agreed that the song "...will cause most delight on account of the quaint simplicity and tenderness of the words, the charming singing of Mdlle. Clary, and the really exquisite setting by Mr. Sullivan.... This is a musical gem".

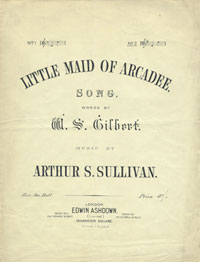

The song enjoyed long-standing popularity. Wyndham writes, "Little maid of Arcadee" was "popular for a quarter of a century". Sullivan's first biographer suggested that "Thespis will be best remembered by the exquisite musical setting to the simple little Gilbertian ballad". Several later commentators write favourably of the song. Walbrook finds it "one of the neatest of Gilbert's ditties, packed with cynicism and slyness, expressed in terms of sentimental tenderness." Goldberg says that it is "dainty, simple and quite in the vein of Gilbert's words, to which, as in almost every later instance, Sullivan's setting provides an original rhythmic piquancy." Fitz-Gerald considers it "quite a forerunner of Gilbert at his easiest", while Dark and Gray call it "a typically dainty Gilbertian love-song worthy to be compared to the best that he ever wrote." Jacobs dissents: "As music it is as trivial as Sullivan ever wrote."

The separately published version had several significant wording differences from the theatrical version, owing to "the contrast between the Gaiety Theatre's suggestiveness and the prudery expected in the drawing room". In the drawing room version, the song's little maid sat by Cousin Robin's knee, not on it. Rather than weary of his lover's play, he became fickle as the month of May. And rather than Cousin Richard came to woo, it was till another came to woo.

=== Climbing over rocky mountain ===
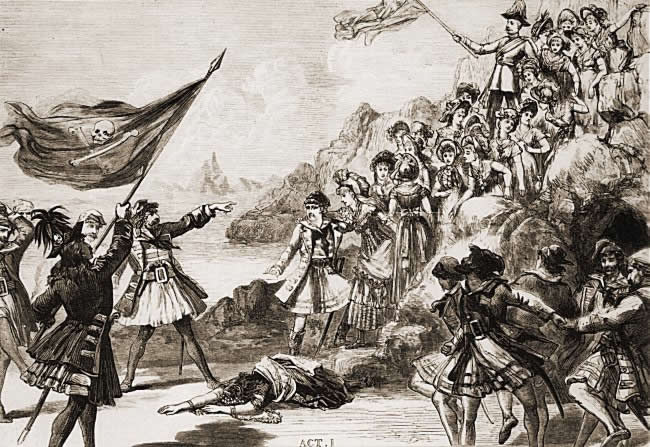
"Climbing over rocky mountain" was reused in Gilbert and Sullivan's fifth opera together, The Pirates of Penzance.

"Climbing over rocky mountain" is the best known piece from Thespis, as it was transplanted in 1879 into one of Gilbert and Sullivan's most successful operas, The Pirates of Penzance. In 1902, Gilbert told a correspondent that this had happened accidentally. He and Sullivan had arrived in New York to produce the new opera, but the composer discovered that he had left his sketches behind in England. Fortunately, the entrance chorus from Thespis fitted the situation almost exactly, so it was substituted instead.

Several scholars have doubted that explanation. In Sullivan's autograph score for the later work, the first part of "Climbing over rocky mountain" is actually taken from a Thespis copyist score, with the Thespis words cancelled and the new words written in, which raises the question of why Sullivan had a Thespis score to hand, if not for that purpose.

Some suggest that other music from Thespis could have been used in Pirates. Goldberg suggests that "It is reasonable to believe that Sullivan made generous use of his Thespis music in other operettas: perhaps owing to the circumstances under which The Pirates of Penzance was written, it contains more than one unacknowledged borrowing from the unlucky firstling of the lucky pair." Reginald Allen says that "it seems certain" from its "rhythmic structure" that part of the Act I finale of Thespis, "Here's a pretty tale for future Iliads and Odysseys" became the original Act II finale in Pirates, "At length we are provided with unusual felicity", which was later deleted. Tillett and Spencer propose that most of Act I of Pirates was taken from Thespis. However, there is only circumstantial evidence for these suggestions. Except for "Climbing over rocky mountain", neither author admitted to borrowing from Thespis for later operas.

=== Ballet ===
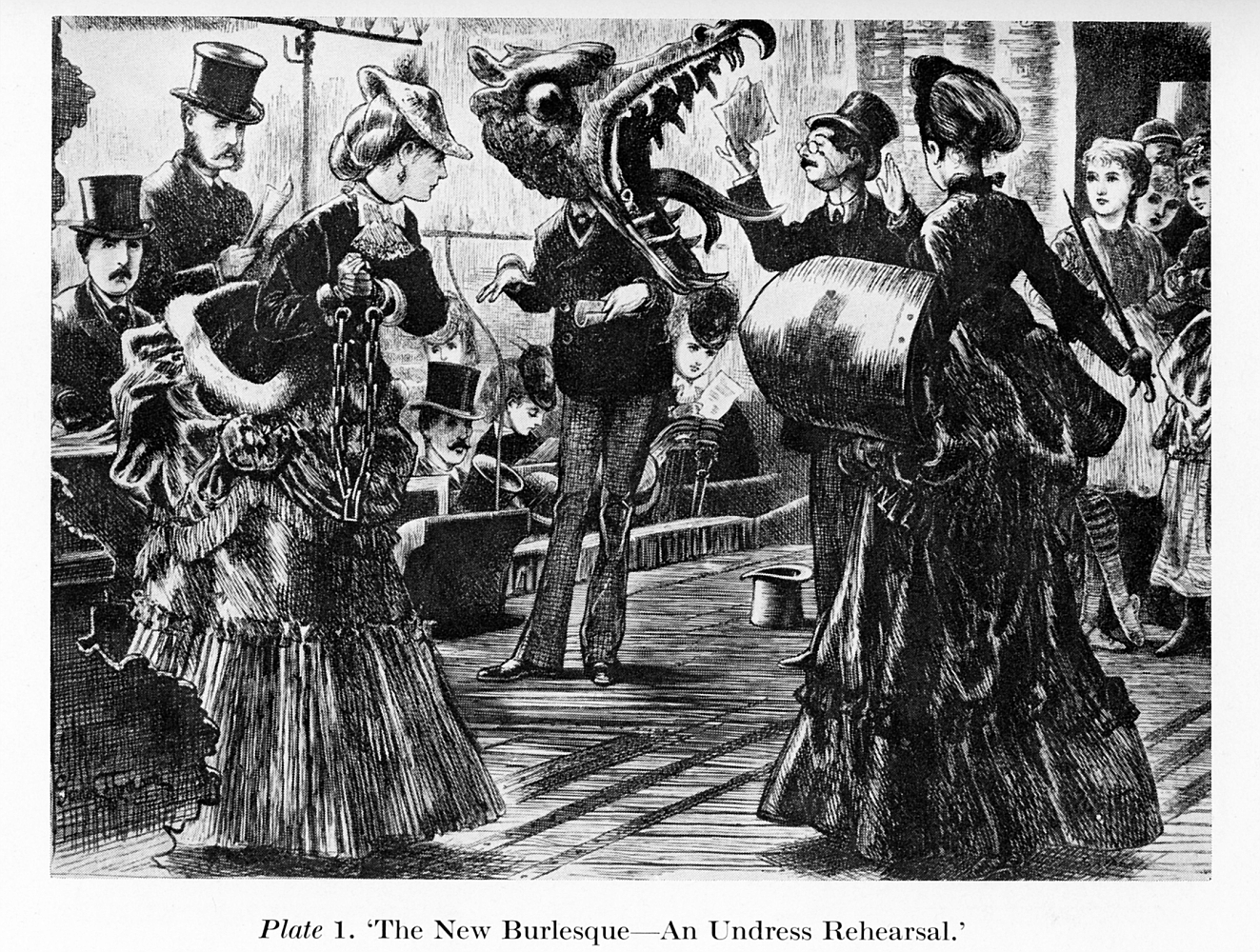
An engraving from The Graphic of a rehearsal that was used by Spencer and Tillett to help identify the missing movements of the ballet.

A five-movement ballet occurred somewhere in Act II, staged by W. H. Payne. A heading in the libretto, "Chorus and Ballet", attaches it to the last section of the finale but does not indicate how it figured in the plot. Most press accounts placed it at about this point, although some placed it slightly earlier in the act. At some performances, the ballet was performed in Act I, but it was certainly in Act II on opening night, and it seems finally to have settled there.

In 1990, Roderick Spencer and Selwyn Tillett discovered the ballet from Act II of Thespis. Two of the five movements, in the same hand that had copied the score of "Climbing over rocky mountain", were found together with the surviving performance materials for Sullivan's 1864 ballet, L'Île Enchantée. Another section was found in the material for his 1897 ballet, Victoria and Merrie England. The page numbering of the surviving three sections gave approximate lengths for the missing pieces, and a contemporary engraving, seen at left, along with other circumstantial evidence, allowed plausible identifications of the two remaining movements: a dragon costume, used nowhere in the libretto, is presumably from the ballet, and the harp visible in the orchestra pit was an unusual instrument for the Gaiety's orchestra. Movements of appropriate length that made sense of these oddities were found in Sullivan's other ballets, and the reconstructed ballet has been recorded twice on CD.

Sullivan tended to re-use his ballet music. Of the five movements that Tillett and Spencer identified, only one (the Waltz, No. 3) is not known to have been used in any other work. Three of the movements had previously been used in L'Île Enchantée. Two of those, and one other, were eventually re-used in Victoria and Merrie England. One was also used in his incidental music to Macbeth. Sullivan was asked in 1889 to supply a ballet for a French-language production of The Mikado in Brussels, which he duly did. Tillett suggests that the Thespis ballet was almost certainly the music that Sullivan provided, given that it was the only ballet that he wrote for use in an opera, and that three weeks after producing The Gondoliers he is unlikely to have written something original.

== Text ==
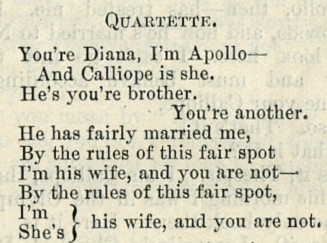
Even the version of the libretto printed in 1911 is not free of sloppy editing. Note the line "He's you're brother".

The surviving libretto is not the version heard by audiences at the Gaiety Theatre. There are numerous discrepancies between the original libretto and what was described as happening on stage, and reviewers repeatedly quoted dialogue that has no equivalent in the published libretto. At least one song is missing, and an entire character, Venus, is mentioned in at least five reviews as stout, elderly, and heavily made-up; she does not appear in the libretto but was listed in the first night programme. Stage directions in the original are slip-shod: characters reappear without an entrance being noted, or enter twice in quick succession, without having exited. In addition, Sullivan told his mother that at least one song was cut after opening night, and there must certainly have been other cuts, given the undue length of the first performance. But the text of the libretto, as published, remained "virtually unchanged" between December 1871 and March 1872.

In a letter to Percy Strzelecki on 23 April 1890, Gilbert apologised for the condition of the libretto. He wrote, "I was in the United States when it was published & I had no opportunity of correcting proofs. This will explain the presence of innumerable typographical & other errors." But several scholars conclude that Gilbert must have been remembering a trip the following year, as in the fall of 1871 it "would have been impossible for Gilbert to travel to America and back in time for rehearsals of Thespis." Even after the first printing, there does not seem to have been any effort to correct the errors: There were four separate issues of the libretto between December and March, but no corrections were made.

Gilbert's final disposition of the libretto came in 1911, when it was included in the fourth volume of his Original Plays. However, Gilbert died before he could correct proofs for that edition, and so it reprinted the 1871 text, correcting only a few spelling mistakes.

== Musical numbers ==
The music is known to survive for numbers shown in bold; a ballet also survives, but its location in the order of musical numbers is uncertain. Reviews of the opera hint at three additional numbers not in the libretto, but as their names and exact locations are unknown, they are not listed.

Act I

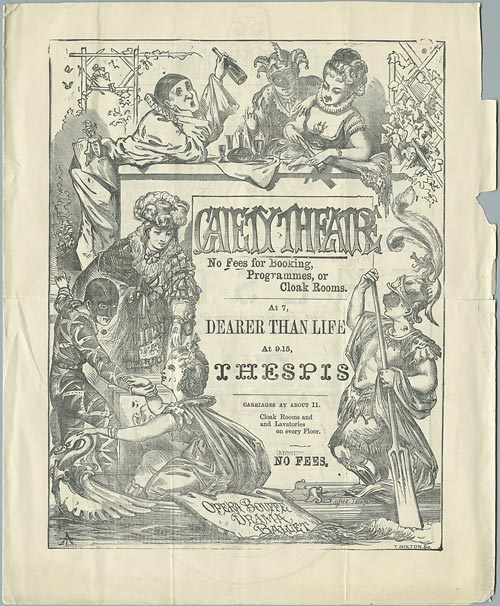
Programme cover, January 1872

- "Throughout the night, the constellations" (Women's Chorus, with Solo)
- "Oh, I'm the celestial drudge" (Mercury)
- "Oh incident unprecedented" (Mercury, Mars, Apollo, Diana, and Jupiter)
- "Here far away from all the world" (Sparkeion and Nicemis)
- **"Climbing over rocky mountain" (Chorus with Solos)**
- Picnic Waltz
- "I once knew a chap who discharged a function" (Thespis)
- Act I Finale: "So that's arranged – you take my place, my boy" (Ensemble)

Act II

- "Of all symposia" (Sillimon and Chorus)
- **"Little maid of Arcadee" (Sparkeion)**
- "Olympus is now in a terrible muddle" (Mercury)
- "You're Diana. I'm Apollo" (Sparkeion, Daphne, Nicemis and Thespis)
- "Oh rage and fury, Oh shame and sorrow" (Jupiter, Apollo, and Mars)
- Act II Finale: "We can't stand this" (Ensemble)

== Recordings ==
As most of the music to Thespis is lost, there is no complete recording of the original score. The ballet, as reconstructed by Spencer and Tillett, has been issued twice on CD:

- Penny, Andrew, conductor (1992). "Thespis". On Sir Arthur Sullivan – Ballet Music (CD). Marco Polo 8.223460.
- Pryce-Jones, John, conductor (1991). "Thespis – Ballet in Act 2". On Iolanthe (CD). That's Entertainment Records CDTER2 1188.

A recording of the Rees/Morton version of Thespis was issued on LP records, which included the original "Little maid of Arcadee" and "Climbing over rocky mountain": Spencer, Roderick, conductor (1972). Thespis, or The Gods Grown Old. Fulham Light Operatic Society. Rare Recorded Editions SRRE 132/3.

"Little maid of Arcadee" has been included in two Sullivan anthologies:

- Adams, Donald, singer (1971, LP). Donald Adams Sings Sullivan and Gilbert, Brookledge Classics SM-GS-1.
- Benton, Jeffrey, singer (1992, cassette). If Doughty Deeds, Symposium 1124.
