= Emily Fowler =

English actress, singer and theatre manager (1847–1896)

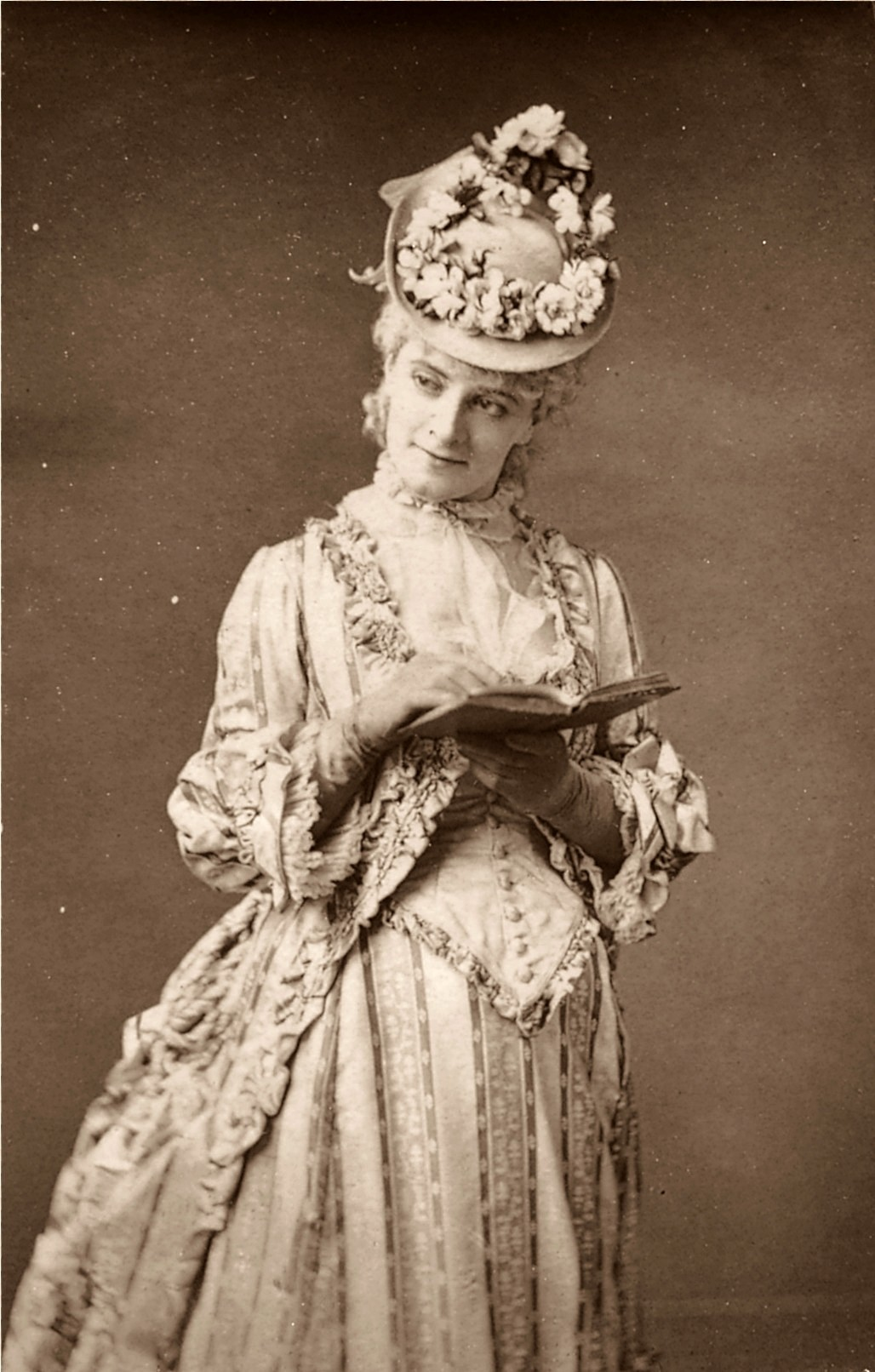
Emily Fowler

Susannah Fowler (22 July 1847 – 1 December 1896 (Note: In her entry in The Dramatic List, 1879 (forerunner of Who's Who in the Theatre) she gives her year of birth as 1849, but it was not unusual for an actress to deduct a year or more from her age, and the official records are unequivocal that the year was 1847.)) known by her stage name Emily Fowler, was an English actress, singer and sometime theatre manager. Beginning in burlesque and other mostly musical works, she later focused on contemporary drama and English classics. Although she was well known on the London stage from 1869 to 1881, she is probably best remembered today for creating roles in three of W. S. Gilbert's early works.

The daughter of a Lancashire cabinet-maker, Fowler was educated in France and Germany, and danced abroad before returning to England at fifteen years of age, where she made her London début in a long-running burlesque of Black-Eyed Susan. She soon created roles in Gilbert's burlesques The Merry Zingara (1868) and Robert the Devil (1869), and also dramatic roles. She took over the management of the Charing Cross Theatre for the 1869–1870 season, at the age of 22, playing more burlesque and drama roles by such playwrights as H. J. Byron, Wybert Reeve and Tom Taylor. In 1870 she originated the leading part of Hans Gopp in The Gentleman in Black, a comic opera by Gilbert and Frederic Clay. Other West End roles followed in drama, pantomime and burlesque. In 1871 she toured with Henry Neville, including in the melodrama The Ticket-of-Leave Man.

Leaving behind musical works and building her reputation as a dramatic actress, she played several roles at the Olympic Theatre, including Beatrice in Much Ado About Nothing (1874). She soon also played Lady Teazle in The School for Scandal and Katherine of Valois in Henry V. In 1878 she became manager of the Royalty Theatre where she played the title role in W. G. Wills's Nell Gwynne. Other West End roles included Perdita in A Winter's Tale at the Drury Lane, and she also toured during this period with Neville in As You Like It among other plays. In 1880, with Henry Irving's company, she played Emily de L'Esparre in The Corsican Brothers at the Lyceum Theatre.

The same year she married for a third time, retired from the stage, and travelled with her husband's regiment, living for a time in India and Penang. She returned to Britain in 1894 to play Lady Winifred Skipton in An Aristocratic Alliance for Charles Wyndham before retiring again.

== Early life and career ==
Fowler was born in Rochdale, Lancashire, the daughter of a cabinet-maker, Samuel Matthew Fowler, and his wife Sophia née Fox. She had four siblings, Clarissa, Samuel, Emily and Sophia. Her family moved to London before 1860, when her father died. According to a profile in the Illustrated Sporting and Dramatic News in 1878, Fowler was educated in France and Germany, and "made her first appearance on the stage abroad as a dancer, under the tuition of Espinosa".

The article in the Illustrated Sporting and Dramatic News later recounts that Fowler returned to England when fifteen years of age and made her London début (Note: Her biographical sketches in The Dramatic List (1879) and W. Davenport Adams's A Dictionary of the Drama (1904) both give the year as 1868, but The Morning Post reviewed her performance in the piece the previous year: "As Gnatbrain, in the extravaganza, she attracts attention by the expertness of her dancing and the general brightness and gaiety of her performance".) in a musical burlesque by F. C. Burnand of the melodrama Black-Eyed Susan, which ran at the Royalty Theatre from 1867 for 400 performances. The same year, she married John Frederick Fenner, a chorister at the Royalty. The union did not last long, and both parties later married bigamously; he died in 1877. She soon created another burlesque breeches role at the Royalty – Florestein – in W. S. Gilbert's The Merry Zingara (1868).

== Peak career ==
In 1869, at the Gaiety Theatre, she created the role of Alice in Gilbert's Robert the Devil (1869) and also played Butts (a maid) in the companion piece, a play, On the Cards. There she also originated the roles of Paraquita ("Queen of Kokatouka") in Columbus (1869). When Fowler took over the management of the Charing Cross Theatre for the 1869–1870 season, at the age of 22, she played Mephistopheles in a new burlesque, Very Little Faust and More Mephistopheles (1869), starred as the hero, Abon Hassan in a burlesque by Arthur O'Neil of Arabian Knights, Mrs Marchmont in Not so Bad After All (in which, according to the Illustrated Sporting and Dramatic News she had "a triumph") and roles in several more plays and burlesques, some by Wybert Reeve. The theatre historian Kurt Gänzl speculates that Reeve was Fowler's financial backer. She also originated the leading part of Hans Gopp in the last piece of the season, The Gentleman in Black, a comic opera written in 1870, with a libretto by W. S. Gilbert and music by Frederic Clay.

As Katherine of Valois in Henry V, with John Coleman, 1876

Later in 1870 she played in Free Labour by Charles Reade at the Adelphi Theatre and at Christmas she starred at the Olympic Theatre as Prince Lardi Dardi in a pantomime of The White Cat. She began to build a reputation in drama playing, for example, Kate Bertram in The Rights of Woman. In 1871 she toured with Henry Neville in Dion Boucicault's Elfie, playing Rose Aircastle and Sam Willoughby in The Ticket-of-Leave Man. In 1872 she was Alfonzo in a burlesque of Zampa at the Royal Court Theatre.

With Neville's company in 1873 at the Olympic, she played Florence in Mystery, Kate Fanshawe in Sour Grapes by H. J. Byron, Martha Gibbs in All That Glitters and Suzanne in The School for Intrigue, an adaptation of Beaumarchais' The Marriage of Figaro. In 1874 at the Olympic she was Lady Betty Noel in Lady Clancarty by Tom Taylor and Beatrice in Much Ado About Nothing. Rutland Barrington, who appeared with Fowler in Lady Clancarty, called her "one of the most delightful soubrettes that ever graced the stage". She also portrayed Louise in The Two Orphans at the Olympic. In 1875 she played Deborah Strickett in The Spendthrift and May Edwards, the heroine, in The Ticket-of-Leave Man. Beeton in The Young English Women praises her in the role of May Edwards and opines that she was one of the best actresses of the domestic drama scene at the time. She also played the role of Lady Teazle in The School for Scandal. Around this time Fowler wed John Callin Pemberton, the son of the actress Amy Sedgwick. She had never divorced her husband, however, and the marriage ended in 1879 on the grounds of illegality.

At the Queen's Theatre in 1876 she was Princess Katherine of Valois in Henry V. This was followed by a season at the St James's Theatre. In 1878 she became manager of the Royalty Theatre. The same year she played the title role in W. G. Wills's Nell Gwynne under her own management at the Royalty, and the Viscountess Lidesdale in Scandal at the same theatre, followed by Perdita in A Winter's Tale at the Theatre Royal, Drury Lane. At the Haymarket Theatre in 1879 she played in Ellen; or Love's Cunning. That year she also appeared in The Gay Deceivers at the Royalty. She also toured during this period and played in As You Like It as Rosalind with Neville, in Hertford as Lady Cathrine Grey and in The Love Chase as Constance.

== Last years ==
In 1880 Fowler joined Henry Irving's company to play Emily de L'Esparre in a revival of The Corsican Brothers at the Lyceum Theatre. E. T. Gilbert writes that Irving paid Fowler an enormous sum for her role because "she could look the high-bred lady of elegant manners", though Gilbert describes her as an unremarkable actress. In that year Fowler married a third time, to a Captain (later Major) Walter Latham Cox, who appears to have been quartered in Oxfordshire for a time. In an interview in June 1894 Fowler said that when she retired as an actress after the Lyceum run to marry Cox she had no thought of ever returning to the stage:

For eleven years I have been with my husband and his regiment, and the last three have been spent in India and Penang, but in the autumn of last year I was ordered to the Engadine to recruit (Note: A now obsolete use of the word, defined in this sense by the Oxford English Dictionary as, To return to strength, health, etc.; to recuperate, recover.) after a bad attack of Indian fever and there I met Mr [Charles] Wyndham. ... We simply discussed the possibility of my return to the stage, and there, so far as I was concerned, the matter ended. On my restoration to health I rejoined my husband, and was looking forward to return to England with him and the battalion.

In 1894 she accepted Wyndham's invitation to play Lady Winifred Skipton in An Aristocratic Alliance, an adaptation of Le Gendre de M. Poirier, at the Criterion Theatre; it had only a modest run of 59 performances. After that she planned to revive one of her earlier successes, The Two Orphans, but was thwarted when another producer announced a revival of the piece, with Marion Terry in Fowler's old role of Louise. She is not known to have returned to the stage after this.

She died on 1 December 1896, aged forty-nine.

== Notes, references and sources ==
=== Sources ===
- Adams, William Davenport (1891). A Book of Burlesque, Sketches of English Stage Travestie and Parody. London: Henry and Company. OCLC 4530191.
- Adams, William Davenport (1904). A Dictionary of the Drama. London: Chatto and Windus. OCLC 1012840.
- Barrington, Rutland (1908). Rutland Barrington: A Record of Thirty-five Years' Experience on the English Stage. London: Grant Richards. OCLC 7745426.
- Beeton, Samuel, ed. (1875). The Young Englishwoman. London: Ward Lock and Tyler. OCLC 963589883.
- Blanchard, Edward L. (1891). The Life and Reminiscences of E. L. Blanchard. London: Hutchinson. OCLC 4563889.
- Gaye, Freda, ed. (1967). Who's Who in the Theatre (fourteenth ed.). London: Sir Isaac Pitman and Sons. OCLC 5997224.
- Gilbert, E. T. (1909). Actors and Actresses by Different Writers, Compiled from Various Magazines. Chicago: Gilbert. OCLC 68267562..
- Hollingshead, John (1895). My Lifetime, Vol 2. London: Sampson Low, Marston. OCLC 5302446.
- Parker, John, ed. (1922). Who's Who in the Theatre (fourth ed.). London: Sir Isaac Pitman and Sons. OCLC 10013276.
- Parker, John, ed. (1925). Who's Who in the Theatre (fifth ed.). London: Sir Isaac Pitman and Sons. OCLC 10013159.
- Pascoe, Charles Eyre (1879). The Dramatic List. London: Hardwicke and Bogue. OCLC 150722532.
- Sherson, Erroll (1925). London's Lost Theatres of the Nineteenth Century. London: John Lane. OCLC 963436484.
- Wearing, J. P. (2013). The London Stage 1890–1899: A Calendar of Productions, Performers, and Personnel. Lanham: Scarecrow Press. ISBN 978-0-81-089282-8.
