= An Old Score =

Play by W. S. Gilbert

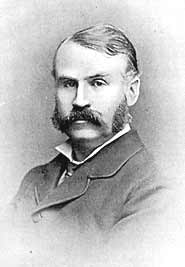
W. S. Gilbert in about 1869

An Old Score is an 1869 three-act comedy-drama written by English dramatist W. S. Gilbert based partly on his 1867 short story, Diamonds, and partly on episodes in the lives of William Dargan, an Irish engineer and railway contractor, and John Sadleir, a banker who committed suicide. It was written before any of his Savoy Operas with Arthur Sullivan. Despite an encouraging review in The Times, the piece was a failure. It was revived in 1872 and rewritten as Quits, but it fared no better.

== Background ==
Gilbert described An Old Score as "my first comedy". He had previously written more than a dozen stage works, and although they were all intended to be funny, they were in the styles of burlesques, extravaganzas, pantomimes and one-act farces, not full-length, character-driven "comedies"; and so the play represents part of Gilbert's move from being a humorist to being a dramatist. Gilbert adapted part of the story of the play from his 1867 short story Diamonds. It is also based partly on episodes in the lives of William Dargan, an Irish contractor, and John Sadleir, a banker who committed suicide in 1856.

The play was written before Gilbert had developed his "Topsy-Turvy" satiric style and so shows Gilbert at his most straightforward. Gilbert was a disciple of the playwright T. W. Robertson, who had introduced naturalistic staging and acting to Victorian era theatre. Robertson's comedies had serious moments, as well as comic, treating their themes with some sentiment and usually conveying a simple moral lesson. Gilbert likewise intended An Old Score to be partly serious, calling it a "comedy-drama". The play borrows elements from Robertson's Ours and Tom Taylor's Still Waters Run Deep. Gilbert had provided another work for John Hollingshead's Gaiety Theatre in London, Robert the Devil (1868), which had opened the theatre.

An Old Score opened at the Gaiety on 26 July 1869. The cast included Rosina Ranoe, who later married F. C. Burnand, and Henry Neville, who later produced some of Gilbert's plays. Following the Victorian tradition of long evenings in the theatre, An Old Score, which ran for two hours, was second on a triple bill beginning with an operetta and ending with a "new opera bouffe", Columbus!, or the Original Pitch in a Merry Key, by Alfred Thompson. It was not a success, despite encouraging reviews, and closed in late August after about 24 performances. It reopened on 11 November 1872 at the Court Theatre in revised form as Quits but did not fare much better, running for about 46 performances.

The Times wrote that "Generally, the characters are sketched with a firm hand, and the dialogue they utter, though not especially brilliant, is consistent and to the purpose." Commenting on its opening night reception by the audience, the paper noted, "An Old Score was followed by every symptom of success, and if its good fortune does not prove permanent it will be because the work is too genuine a comedy to suit the taste of the age." When Gilbert originally proposed the play to Hollingshead, the manager of the Gaiety Theatre, the latter was impressed by its "clever dialogue". After its failure, however, Hollingshead opined that the piece had "one great and only fault: It was 'too clever by half.' It was too true to nature – disagreeable nature. It was not served up with enough make-believe sauce." Hollingshead noted that, in the play, a son argues with his father. This was unacceptable to audiences in 1869. Gilbert expert Andrew Crowther writes that, although the play has faults, "we can judge An Old Score to be a genuinely powerful drama. There are scenes in this play which are so powerful that they knock the reader back in his seat. There is a "shooting-from-the-hip" quality about some of the scenes which is exhilarating and even just a little bit shocking." It may be, also, that the play was too intimate for the huge stage of the Gaiety.

The play was published in 1869 by Samuel French Ltd., in 1870 by Thomas Hailes Lacy and again in 1877 by Samuel French Ltd.

== Roles and original cast ==
- Colonel Calthorpe – Samuel Emery
- Harold Calthorpe (his son) – John Clayton
- James Casby (a Bombay merchant) – Henry Neville
- Parkle (an attorney) – Mr. Maclean
- Manasseh (a bill discounter [a comic Jewish money lender]) – J. Eldred
- Flathers (a footman, afterwards Harold's clerk) – J. Robins
- Ethel Barrington (Colonel Calthorpe's niece) – Miss Henrade
- Mary Waters (a nursery governess) – Rosina Ranoe
- Mrs. Pike (a Gray's Inn laundress) – Mrs. Leigh

== Synopsis ==
Act I

Ethel Barrington, the niece of Colonel Calthorpe, is engaged to be married to James Casby, an honest and successful merchant from Bombay. The Colonel, formerly a man of means, had paid for Casby's schooling and helped him find his first job, and so the Colonel believes that Casby owes him a large debt a gratitude. The Colonel is angry that Casby, while acknowledging the Colonel's help, has not agreed to give him the money to pay his now-substantial debts (although Casby cryptically states that he will satisfy the debt in another way). Ethel, however, is in love with her cousin Harold Calthorpe, who lives an extravagant lifestyle. Harold, in turn, loves Mary Waters, a nursery governess. He leaves his father's house because Mary is cruelly dismissed from her post and vows to marry her.

Act II

In Harold's chambers, Mary and Harold are not yet married. He is well paid for writing scandalous articles for The Tormenter, a journal, but he is morally disturbed by doing this and turns to drink. Casby and Ethel ask him to return home to his father, but Harold refuses. Colonel Calthorpe then arrives in good spirits, having just inherited some money and a title from a relative, Lord Ovington. He offers to forgive Harold, but Harold still loves Mary and confronts his father with his disreputable action towards her. He refuses to return home.

Act III

Since the Colonel is now the new Lord Ovington, Casby is no longer an eligible match for his niece, Ethel. The Colonel encourages Casby to break off the engagement, which does not bother Ethel much, since she still loves Harold and never loved Casby. Harold has gone missing, and Mary arrives looking for him. Mary and Ethel find some common ground in this misfortune and strike up a friendship. Casby now aims to settle his old score with Lord Ovington and goes to see him. He notes that Ovington's acts in helping him as a youth were entirely self-interested, because Ovington needed to do so to reverse his previous reputation for cruelty while in the army. By taking this apparently philanthropic action, Ovington had won the hand of a wealthy lady. Nevertheless, Casby is indeed grateful for the help. He reveals some notes on which Ovington had forged Casby's name as guarantor to several loans: Casby has now paid these on Ovington's behalf and further notes that he will not expose Ovington as a forger and has therefore freed Ovington from the threat of prison. So, they are now even (as Casby says, they are "quits"). Ethel, concealed, sees this interview, which makes her love Casby and forget her feelings for Harold, who has now been found and who can now marry Mary.
