= John Maclean (actor) =

English actor (1835–1890)

- Born: c. 1835; London, England
- Died: 15 March 1890 (aged 54–55); London, England
- Occupation: Actor

John Maclean (c. 1835 – 15 March 1890) was an English actor. Though never a star, he built a reputation as a sound, experienced and reliable performer. He appeared in a wide range of productions, from Shakespeare (playing both Claudius and later Polonius), and Sheridan (Sneer in The Critic and Sir Peter Teazle in The School for Scandal) to the first Gilbert and Sullivan opera, Thespis (as Jupiter, chief of the gods). After early engagements in the English provinces he made his West End début in 1861 and thereafter appeared mostly in London theatres, although he made one tour of the US late in his career.

== Life and career ==
=== Early years ===
Maclean was born in London in about 1835. (Note: The April 1881 census returns show John Maclean, actor, and his wife, Harriet, living in Fitzrovia, London; his age is recorded as 46 and his birthplace as Westminster.) He began his career giving dramatic recitations, and made his first appearances on the stage at the Theatre Royal, Plymouth, in 1859, playing Claudius to the Hamlet of Charles Kean during the season.

After acting in Jersey, Guernsey and Birmingham, Maclean made his London début on 7 September 1861 at the Surrey Theatre as Peter Purcell in The Idiot of the Mountain. On 27 May 1863, at the Olympic Theatre, he was the original Mr Gibson in The Ticket-of-Leave Man, by Tom Taylor. He became a member of Richard Shepherd's company at the Surrey and also joined Hermann Vezin at the Princess's, playing the original Saunders – an old Scottish servant – in W. G. Wills's first big success, The Man of Airlie.

=== The Gaiety ===
John Hollingshead engaged Maclean for his newly rebuilt Gaiety Theatre; the actor remained in the company there until 1879. On the opening night of the Gaiety on 21 December 1868, he was the first Sir Gilbert Ethelward in On the Cards a version by Alfred Thompson of the French comedy L'Escamoteur.

Maclean's subsequent roles at the Gaiety included the original Duke of Loamshire in Robertson's Dreams (27 March 1869); the first Marquis de Fontenelle in The Life Chase (11 October 1869), an adaptation by John Oxenford and Horace Wigan of Le Drame de la rue de la Paix, a French murder mystery; and Sir Tunbelly Clumsey in The Man of Quality (7 May 1870), Hollingshead's revised version of the Vanbrugh's The Relapse – neither the adaptation nor Maclean's performance was well received by the critics. In December 1871 Maclean appeared as Jupiter in Thespis, the first Gilbert and Sullivan opera. Most of the press attention centred on J. L. Toole (Thespis) and Nellie Farren (Mercury) but The Era, praised Maclean, along with J. G. Taylor and Robert Soutar, for "invaluable assistance" to the two stars.

Also at the Gaiety, Maclean played Polonius to the Hamlet of Walter Montgomery. Among other parts in which he was seen there were O'Tarragon in H. J. Byron's Bull by the Horns; Sneer in The Critic; and Lord Bareacres in F. C. Burnand's Jeames 26 August 1878.

=== Later years ===
When Hollingshead took over the management of the Olympic, Maclean returned there, playing in Such a Good Man by Walter Besant and James Rice, and Brighton, an adaptation by F. A. Marshall of the American comedy Saratoga. In 1881 he was at the Vaudeville Theatre, playing Mr Popplejohn in Divorce, an adaptation by Robert Reece of Le père de l'Avocat; Martin Chuzzlewit in a stage version of the novel; and Dr Lattimer in Byron's Punch. At the same theatre he played Sir Peter Teazle in a revival of The School for Scandal.

In 1884 Maclean joined Edgar Bruce's company, at the Prince's Theatre (subsequently the Prince of Wales's), appearing on the opening night, 18 January, in a revival of W. S. Gilbert's The Palace of Truth and on 3 March in Breaking a Butterfly, adapted from Ibsen's A Doll's House by H. A. Jones and Henry Herman. In a revival at the St James's Theatre of As You Like It in January 1885, he played Adam, taking over the part from John Hare, who switched to the role of Touchstone before the production opened.

In September 1887 Maclean played Camillo in Mary Anderson's revival of The Winter's Tale at the Lyceum. He accompanied Anderson to the US in the same play. After his return to England he appeared infrequenty. His last appearance was at the Gaiety in My Brother's Sister, playing Achille Henri de la Bernadet, an elderly French nobleman.

Maclean died suddenly on 15 March 1890 at his home in Fitzrovia, and was buried on 19 March at Paddington Cemetery. The Era said of him, "Mr Maclean was highly respected in private life for his sincerity, benevolence and kindly feeling" and described him as having "an excellent reputation as a sound, experienced and reliable actor".

== Notes, references and sources ==
=== Sources ===
- Rollins, Cyril; R. John Witts (1962). The D'Oyly Carte Opera Company in Gilbert and Sullivan Operas: A Record of Productions, 1875–1961. London: Michael Joseph. OCLC 504581419.
- Wearing, J. P. (1976). The London Stage, 1890–1899: A Calendar of Plays and Players. Vol. 1. Metuchen: Scarecrow Press. ISBN 0-81-080910-9.
