= J. G. Taylor =

James Goulde Taylor (1836 or 1837 – 17 January 1904), known professionally as J. G. Taylor, was an English actor, best known in comic roles. At various times in his career he was a member of resident companies at West End theatres including John Hollingshead's Gaiety and later Charles Wyndham's Criterion. He appeared in a range of productions, including Shakespeare and Gilbert and Sullivan as well as premieres and revivals of contemporary nineteenth-century plays.

== Life and career ==
Taylor was born in Manchester in north-west England in 1836 or 1837. He began his working life as a clerk in a lawyer's office, but went on the stage, making his début in Aberdeen in 1858. He made his first London appearance at the Olympic Theatre in November 1864, where he remained for five years before joining the companies at the Strand Theatre and then Covent Garden and later John Hollingshead's Gaiety Theatre. He began his time at the last of these playing a vicious legal clerk in H. J. Byron's play Wait and Hope, starring J. L. Toole. The Era commented that Taylor distinguished himself, acting with "great care and with unusual force of expression".

Although most of Taylor's roles were in nineteenth-century comedies he achieved success in a Shakespearian part in 1874 when Hollingshead, wishing to present something more ambitious than his usual productions, mounted Shakespeare's The Merry Wives of Windsor. Taylor played Master Slender in a cast headed by Samuel Phelps as Falstaff and including Rose Leclercq and Mrs John Wood as the merry wives, Hermann Vezin as Ford, Johnston Forbes-Robertson as Fenton, Teresa Furtado as Anne, Arthur Cecil as Dr Caius and Robert Soutar as Pistol. He again played in Shakespeare in 1875 as Verges in Hollingshead's production of Much Ado About Nothing: The Daily News said that the production "furnishes no more finished piece of acting than Mr J. G. Taylor's assumption of the part of Verges. It is a portrait cut in the tenderest lines. His spare grey hairs and shadowy form are a study, and every movement, attitude, and inflexion of voice bespeaks the feebleness of body and waning faculties of Dogberry's faithful attendant".

Taylor appeared in works by W. S. Gilbert (Robert the Devil and Princess Toto), Arthur Sullivan (Cox and Box), and by both, creating the role of Sillimon in the first Gilbert and Sullivan opera, Thespis, in 1871. He later played the Learned Judge in their Trial by Jury, but incurred Gilbert's displeasure in 1879 by playing Sir Joseph Porter in H.M.S. Pinafore in an unauthorised production of the piece, giving what Gilbert called "a low comedy" performance. Nonetheless, according to the theatrical newspaper The Era, he made a notable hit in the role in the US. He also appeared in Hervé's comic opera Aladdin the Second with Toole and other members of the Gaiety company, including Florence Farr and Nellie Farren.

Following her first tour of the British provinces Lillie Langtry starred in Tom Taylor's An Unequal Match at the Imperial Theatre in late 1882; Taylor played the comic role of Blenkinsop, taking over from W. H. Denny, who had played it on tour. Taylor played John Canty in Mrs Omar Beringer's adaptation of The Prince and the Pauper, produced at the Gaiety in 1890. He was the Caderousse in a production of Monte Cristo at the Avenue Theatre in February 1891, and in a revival of The Pharisee at the Grand Theatre, Islington in the same year he played Captain James Darrell. He joined Charles Wyndham's company at the Criterion Theatre in 1893 playing Wentworth Brace in a revival of The Headless Man and in Wyndham's production of An Aristocratic Alliance in March 1894 he appeared as Anthony Greenwood. In 1897 he appeared in Wyndham's production of The Physician. Two years later he played Mr Lorry in The Only Way, a dramatisation of A Tale of Two Cities.

Shortly after returning from a long American tour, Taylor died aged 67 on 17 January 1904 after a brief illness and an unsuccessful operation.

== Sources ==
- Hollingshead, John (1903). Good Old Gaiety: An Historiette and Remembrance. London: Gaiety Theatre Company. OCLC 1684298.
- Rees, Terence (1964). Thespis – A Gilbert & Sullivan Enigma. London: Dillon's University Bookshop. ISBN 0-90-033304-9.
- Rollins, Cyril; R. John Witts (1962). The D'Oyly Carte Opera Company in Gilbert and Sullivan Operas: A Record of Productions, 1875–1961. London: Michael Joseph. OCLC 504581419.
- Sullivan, Herbert; Newman Flower (1927). Sir Arthur Sullivan: His Life, Letters and Diaries. London: Cassell. OCLC 462423076.
