= The Gentleman in Black =

Comic opera by W. S. Gilbert and Frederic Clay

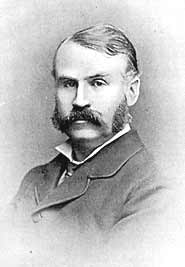
W. S. Gilbert in about 1870

The Gentleman in Black is a two-act comic opera written in 1870 with a libretto by W. S. Gilbert and music by Frederic Clay. The "musical comedietta" opened at the Charing Cross Theatre on 26 May 1870. It played for 26 performances, until the theatre closed at the end of the season. The plot involves body-switching, facilitated by the magical title character. It also involves two devices that Gilbert would re-use: baby-switching and a calendar oddity.

Produced soon after Gilbert first met Arthur Sullivan, but before the two had collaborated, Gilbert's first full-length comic opera, The Gentleman in Black, was based on the theatrically popular theory of metempsychosis. Gilbert and Frederic Clay had collaborated previously on a one-act opera, Ages Ago. The music was not published and is now lost. The piece was never revived in Gilbert's lifetime, although modern performances have been given, some adapting Sullivan music.

The libretto is included in Original Plays by W. S. Gilbert in Four Series, in the fourth volume in the series (1911) published by Chatto and Windus of London.

== Background ==
From the mid-1860s through the early 1870s, W. S. Gilbert was extremely productive, writing a large quantity of comic verse, theatre reviews and other journalistic pieces, short stories, and dozens of plays and comic operas. His output in 1870 alone included dozens of his popular comic Bab Ballads; two blank verse comedies, The Princess and The Palace of Truth; two comic operas, Our Island Home and The Gentleman in Black; and various other short stories, comic pieces, and reviews appearing in various periodicals and newspapers. In 1871 he was even busier, producing seven plays and operas.

Gilbert's dramatic writing during this time was evolving from his early musical burlesques. Some of his work during this period exhibited a more restrained style, exemplified by a series of successful "fairy comedies", such as The Palace of Truth (1870). At the same time, he was developing his unique style of absurdist humour, described as "Topsy-Turvy", made up of "a combination of wit, irony, topsyturvydom, parody, observation, theatrical technique, and profound intelligence". The opera The Gentleman in Black, one of Gilbert's most absurdist pieces, dates from the middle of this period, when Gilbert was trying different styles and working towards the mature comic style of his later work, including the famous series of Gilbert and Sullivan operas.

The story of The Gentleman in Black contains early glimpses of some of the "Topsy Turvy" ideas that Gilbert would later use in his more famous works written with Arthur Sullivan, including the switching of infants who grow up to be different ages (as in H.M.S. Pinafore) and plot devices that depend on technical errors involving the calendar (as in The Pirates of Penzance). The music was in an "Offenbachian" vein, and the story is a "dramatic variation of the pseudo-German supernatural tale, such as Dickens's 'The Baron of Grogswig'", "The Metapsychosis" or Gilbert's own "The Triumph of Vice".

== Synopsis ==
The opera is set in 1584 with Act I in the Market Place of a German Village and Act II at the Gates of Castle Schlachenschloss.

Act I

Bertha Pompopplesdorf, who considers herself the prettiest girl in the village, is engaged to Hans Gopp, a handsome, kindly, but simple villager (Gopp was originally played by a woman). Hans is jealous of the rich, but ugly, old and unpleasant Baron Otto von Schlachenstein, who is strangely attractive to women. The Baron woos Bertha. Bertha pretends to be in love with the Baron to teach Hans a lesson. Depressed by this, Hans wishes that he could swap places with the Baron. At the same time, the Baron, realising that Bertha is just using him, envies Hans and wants to swap places with him. The Gentleman in Black (the King of the Gnomes) has the power to transfer souls. He offers to make the two men's wishes come true by exchanging their souls and bodies for one month. The date is 13 August 1584, and so the souls will revert to their original bodies on 13 September. He utters this spell:

Otto's body, grim and droll,
Shrine young Hans's simple soul;
Otto's soul, of moral shoddy,
Occupy young Hans's body!

Act II

After the souls are transferred, Hans notices that Bertha is attracted to his former body, which now contains the Baron's soul. Hans is now rich, but he is old and ugly, with a large family. To the Baron, the attention of Bertha and the advantages of a younger body are not sufficient compensation for the life of poverty that he now must live. He devises a cunning plan. He tells Hans that, as babies, they were both nursed by Hans's mother, and that the peasant baby was jealous of the young Baron.

"One night – the babes were three weeks old, and were wonderfully alike – the peasant's babe crept from his clothes basket, quietly removed the sleeping Baron from his sumptuous cradle, placed the Baron's son in the clothes basket, and creeping into the Baron's cradle, covered himself up and went to sleep. The cheat was never discovered! The peasant's son was brought up as the young Baron – the young Baron as the peasants son."

Hans: "But I think you must be mistaken, for you are twenty years older than I am."

Baron: "I am now – but when I was three weeks old, of course I was the same age as you were when you were three weeks old. ... You see I am naturally quicker than you are – besides, I'm ashamed to say I've lived a very fast life".

Hans signs a contract agreeing to these facts and stipulating that they should resume their original social positions immediately. So Hans becomes a peasant in the old Baron's body but assumes that he will be a youthful Baron beginning on 13 September. However, this is all a trick so that the Baron can immediately regain his baronial station. By 13 September, he says, "I shall destroy the paper, and prove by the fact that I am twenty years older than he is, it's utterly impossible we could have been changed at birth – I shall return to my rank, and he will be punished as an impostor." But an announcement is made before the Baron puts his plan into action:

"Proclamation! Whereas certain irregularities have crept into the calendar in the course of the last 1584 years, and whereas these irregularities (although in themselves unimportant), constitute in the aggregate a considerable space of time, be it enacted, and it is hereby enacted, that from this date forward, thirteen days be omitted from the calendar, whereby this third day of September under the Old Style becomes the thirteenth day of September under the New Style!"

The result of this imperfectly calculated proclamation is that the Baron and Hans find themselves immediately in their original bodies. Hans and Bertha begin a life of youthful nobility, and the Baron is left an ugly, old peasant.

== Original cast ==
- The Baron Otto von Schlachenstein – Edward Danvers
- Grumpff, his steward – William M. Terrott
- Hans Gopp, a Villager – Emily Fowler
- The Gentleman in Black – Charles P. Flockton
- Tintelstein, Syndic of Schlachenschloss – F. Robson
- Schlipps, an Innkeeper – Mr. Herbert
- Bertha Pomopplesdorf – Emmeline Cole
- The Baroness von Schlachenstein – Helen Maxse
- Maria, a market girl – Miss Dalton
- Gretchen, a market girl – Rose Roberts
- Emma – Miss Wilson
