= Constance Loseby =

British actress and singer

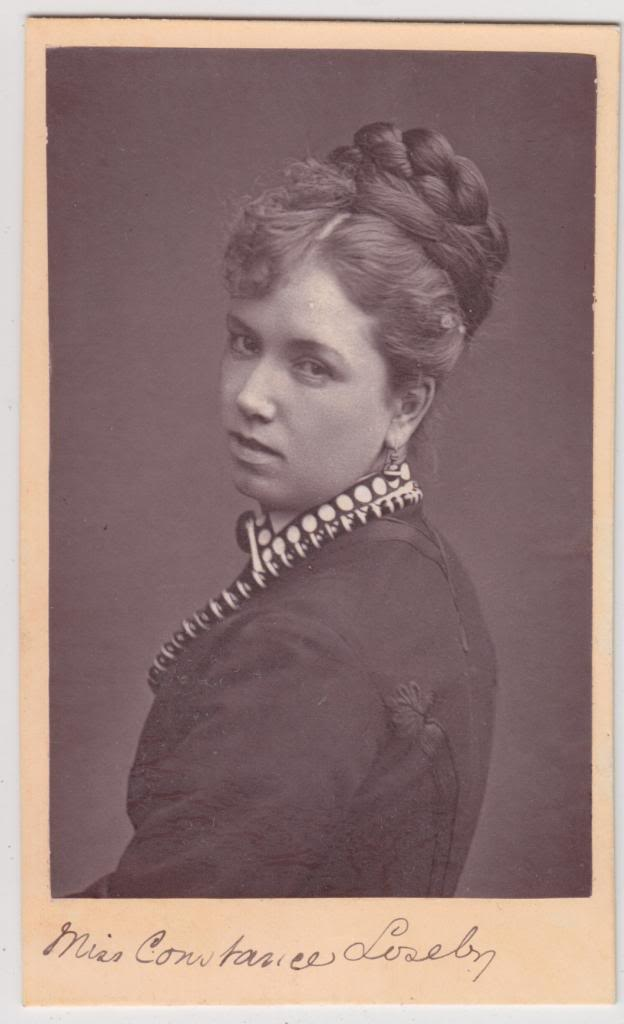
Constance Loseby in 1875

Constance Loseby (1842–13 October 1906) was a leading British actress and singer of the late Victorian era best remembered for performing in some early works of W. S. Gilbert and Arthur Sullivan, including Robert the Devil (1868) and Thespis (1871), and known for other roles in operetta and musical theatre.

== Early life and career ==
Born in Nottingham in 1842, Loseby's theatrical appearances included Raimbault in W. S. Gilbert's Victorian burlesque Robert the Devil (1868); creating the role of Prince Raphael in the London premiere of Offenbach's La princesse de Trébizonde (1870); Princess Veloutine in Hervé's "operatic extravaganza" Aladdin the 2nd (1870) starring Nellie Farren and J. L. Toole; Paris in La Belle Helene (July 1871); Belazza in the opéra bouffe Cinderella the Younger (September 1871), and Nicemis in Gilbert and Sullivan's Thespis (December 1871), all at the Gaiety Theatre in London. During a recess at the Gaiety in 1870 she had a brief singing engagement at The South London Music Hall in Lambeth. One of her most popular songs was 'Sally In Our Alley'.

Further appearances included a comic opera version of Cinderella at the Holborn Theatre (1874–1875); in La Poule aux Oeufs D’or (1878–1879); Dolly in The Sultan of Mocha (1876); reprising the role of Prince Raphael in La princesse de Trébizonde (1879); as Marguerite in Mefistofele (1880) with Lizzie St Quentin in the title role, Fred Leslie as Faust and Lionel Brough as Valentine; Jeanneton in Lacôme's Jeanne, Jeannette et Jeanneton (1881), and the title role in The Black Crook (1881–1882), the latter all at the Alhambra Theatre in London.

== Marriage and later years ==
In 1864 in London she married John Caulfield (1839-before 1891), a Professor of Music. Their daughter was Constance Elizabeth Louisa Caulfield (1871–1956). By 1891 Loseby had retired from the stage and owned the Victoria Hotel in Aldershot, Hampshire. She took part in a last night performance at London's Gaiety Theatre in 1903 before its demolition along with Gaiety stars past and present including E. W. Royce, Lionel Brough, Richard Temple and Henry Irving.

At the time of her death in 1906 she was a widow living in the Red Lion Hotel in Milford, Surrey. In her will she left £1,648 8s 9d to her daughter.
