= Robert the Devil (Gilbert) =

Operatic parody by W. S. Gilbert

Programme for 1869 production

Robert the Devil, or The Nun, the Dun, and the Son of a Gun is an operatic parody by W. S. Gilbert of Giacomo Meyerbeer's grand opera Robert le diable, which was named after, but bears little resemblance to, the medieval French legend of the same name. Gilbert set new lyrics to tunes by Meyerbeer, Bellini, Offenbach and others.

The piece premiered at the opening of the newly rebuilt Gaiety Theatre in London on 21 December 1868. An extravaganza played on a very large scale, it ran for over 120 performances and played continuously in the British provinces for three years thereafter. It also enjoyed several revivals. The original production starred Nellie Farren in the title role – she became the company's leading "principal boy". Several of the other male roles were played by women, as was common in burlesques of the day.

== History ==
Robert the Devil was part of a series of five operatic burlesques written early in Gilbert's career. The first was Dulcamara, or the Little Duck and the Great Quack an 1866 musical spoof of Donizetti's L'elisir d'amore. The second was La Vivandière; or, True to the Corps!, a parody of Donizetti's La fille du régiment (1867). The others were The Merry Zingara; or, the Tipsy Gipsy and the Pipsy Wipsy (Royalty Theatre, 1868), a burlesque of Balfe's The Bohemian Girl and The Pretty Druidess; or, the Mother, the Maid, and the Mistletoe Bough (Charing Cross Theatre, 1869), a burlesque of Bellini's Norma.

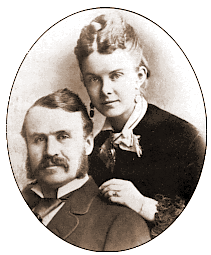
Gilbert and his wife, Lucy, in 1867

The libretto of Robert the Devil is set in rhyming couplets, as are the other Gilbert burlesques. The opening night performance was under-rehearsed, partly because the new Gaiety Theatre was not finished until the last moment, leaving no time for rehearsal on its stage. Therefore, the evening's entertainments received mixed reviews, except for the uniformly enthusiastic reviews of Nellie Farren. However, The Times noted that "Like the other extravaganzas from the same pen, Robert the Devil shows an endeavour to avoid the ordinary vulgarities of grotesque drama, and bring its most elegant contingencies into the foreground.... The burlesque has been received with a storm of approbation."

The success of Robert and Dulcamara showed that Gilbert could write entertainingly in this form and, together with his early pantomimes and farces, full of awful puns (traditional in burlesques of the period), though they do, at times, show signs of the satire that would later be a defining part of his work. These led to Gilbert's more mature "fairy comedies", such as The Palace of Truth (1870) and Pygmalion and Galatea (1871), which in turn led to the famous Gilbert and Sullivan operas. Although Gilbert gave up direct parodies of opera soon after Robert, his parodic pokes at grand opera continued to be seen in the Savoy operas.

The title character, a breeches role, was played as an insouciant "swell" by Nellie Farren, who became famous as the theatre's "principal boy". Gilbert later renounced travesti roles and revealing dresses on his actresses, and made publicly known his disapproval of them. In January 1885 Hollingshead crossed swords him on the subject, writing to the Pall Mall Gazette, "Mr. Gilbert is somewhat severe on a style of burlesque which he did much to popularise in the old days before he invented what I may call burlesque in long clothes. … Mr Gilbert never objected to the dresses in Robert the Devil nor to the dresses in Thespis."

== Productions ==
Robert the Devil was part of a triple bill that opened John Hollingshead's new Gaiety Theatre in London on 21 December 1868. Also on the programme, preceding Gilbert's piece, were a one-act adaptation by Gilbert Arthur à Beckett of a French operetta by Émile Jonas, called The Two Harlequins, and a three-act parody of L'Escamoteur by Paulin Meunier, adapted by Alfred Thompson, called On the Cards. All three of these were parodies of operas written between 1830 and 1840. Alfred Thompson also designed the sets of the triple bill. Gilbert set new lyrics to tunes by Meyerbeer, Hérold, Bellini, Hervé, Offenbach and others, arranged by Mr. Kettenus, the theatre's music director; the opening night programme also credits him with some composition.

The burlesque was Gilbert's biggest success to date, running for over 120 performances and playing continuously in the provinces for three years thereafter. It was an extravaganza played on a very large scale. By 29 March 1869, it was preceded by T. W. Robertson's play Dreams and The Two Harlequins and sometimes ran with Letty the Basketmaker, an obscure opera by Michael Balfe. The work was revived at the Gaiety Theatre several times over the next few years, and a tenth anniversary revival was staged at the Gaiety in 1878.

The piece starred Nellie Farren in the title role and also featured women as Ferdinando, Bertuccio and Albert, and Constance Loseby as Raimbault, totalling five actresses playing male roles, a practice that Gilbert would later disclaim. The piece also featured Emily Fowler as Alice, and, in his stage debut, Richard Barker, later Richard D'Oyly Carte's long-serving stage manager. The principal dancer was Anna Bossi, from the Opera-house, St Petersburg, and the pantomimists (playing mysterious fiddlers who accompany Bertram) were John D'Auban (who was later Gilbert's choreographer) and John Warde (brother of Willie Warde), who had previously worked with Hollingshead at the Alhambra Theatre.

The supporting cast changed for revivals at the Gaiety. The 1871 revival cast included "the Misses Farren, Dolaro, Loseby, Tremaine and Wilson, Messrs Maclean, Taylor etc." It is possible that the cast list in the libretto mistakenly refers to one of the revival casts. In 1872 the Gaiety company took the piece on tour in England and Ireland, where it was played in double or triple bills, sometimes in tandem with Sullivan and Burnand's Cox and Box. In that company were Farren, Alice Cook, J. G. Taylor, T. Sullivan, Marian West, Miss Wallace, Miss Berend, and Miss Gordon.

== Synopsis ==
Robert the Devil at the Gaiety, September 1869

In the port of Palermo, the crowd are watching Robert, Duke of Normandy, consuming an enormous meal and smoking cigarettes (a cheeky piece of business, as Robert was played by a woman), accompanied by a sinister companion, Bertram. The crowd expresses their doubts about Robert's creditworthiness (to the tune of Meyerbeer's opening brindisi). Among them is Albert, the Prince of Granada. Robert leaves the bill for Bertram to pay. Bertram, a "devil by compulsion" says that he is the "Town traveller for the Gentleman Below" and must 'secure one victim every day'. He asks for a volunteer. Of course, no one steps forward. Rambaldo, a minstrel, arrives and offers to sing about Robert. He circulates his cap. Then he sings a catalogue of Robert's misdeeds, much to the annoyance of Robert and Bertram. Rambaldo also has "a work in verse, three volumes long" about Robert's "latest scandals". The saintly Alice then arrives, whom Robert claims as his foster-sister.

Bertram advises Robert to steal a magic branch that will give him great powers. All Robert has to do is sign an indenture for his soul. This branch turns out to be in the Chamber of Horrors in Madame Tussaud's wax museum. A chorus of wax figures of famous dead people come to life at midnight and sing about being wax works (to the tune of 'A fosco cielo' from Vincenzo Bellini's La sonnambula). The magic branch turns out to be a policeman's staff with a scroll attached, stating that the staff can grant the bearer invisibility and freezes people in their places (including politicians). Robert, Bertram and Bertram's henchman, Gobetto, conspire.

Before Robert can seize the branch, Bertram insists that he sign the contract. Robert agrees. The wax works perform a naughty ballet recalling the ballet in a "cloister by moonlight" of faithless, deceased nuns that created a sensation at the time of the Meyerbeer opera including, according to the stage directions, "the usual business between Robert and the Lady Abbess". Robert wishes to use the power of the branch to marry, against Bertram's wishes. Bertram reveals that he is Robert's father. Robert says, "My father? Then of course I must submit! But are you sure?" Bertram points out that a note from his mother confirms the fact. However, the wax-works reappear to drag Bertram, not down to Hell as in Meyerbeer's opera, but instead to a worse fate, to become an exhibit at Madame Tussaud's. A terrified Bertram pleads desperately to escape this, asking that one of the other wax works be disguised as him. But his appeals are in vain, and everyone tells him that he can't do "much more harm" in "the waxworks of Tussaud."

== Roles and original cast ==
The Gaiety programme and the printed libretto differ markedly in their cast lists. The following list is from the programme. London press reports confirm these names. Where the libretto lists other names, they are given in footnotes.

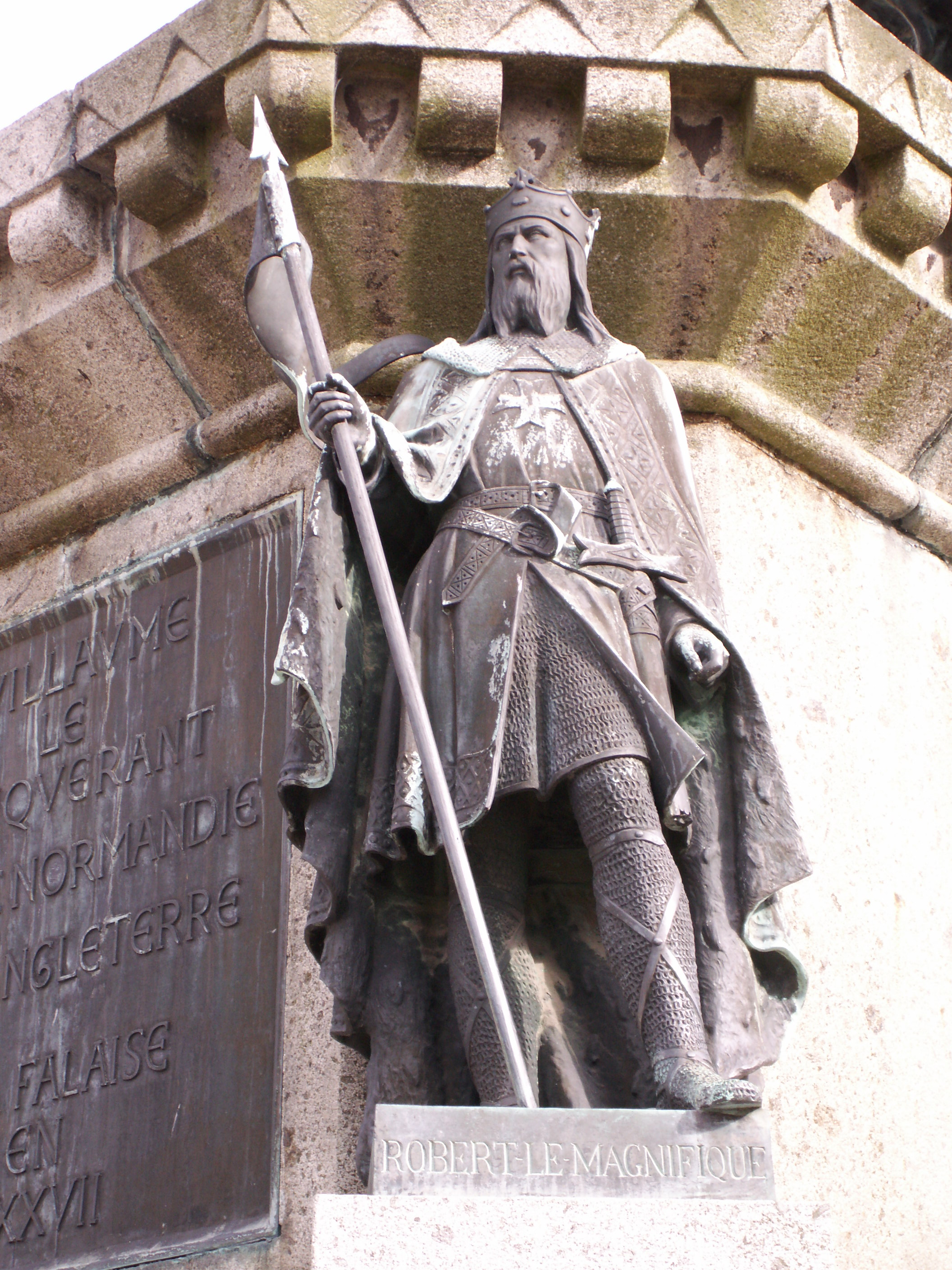
Statue of Robert, Duke of Normandy, known as "Le diable"

- Robert, Duke of Normandy (nicknamed "The Devil") – Nellie Farren
- Bertram (his father, disguised as a Sicilian nobleman) – Richard Barker
- Raimbault (troubadour, betrothed to Alice) – Constance Loseby
- Alice – Emily Fowler
- Albert, Prince of Granada – Annie Tremaine
- Gobetto (a drunken Sicilian boor, afterwards Bertram's familiar) – Joseph Eldred
- Old Bailey (wax figure from Chamber of Horrors) – Joe Robins
- A Lady (wax figure from Chamber of Horrors) – Miss Ashton
- King John (wax figure from Chamber of Horrors) – Mr. Everet
- Richard III (wax figure from Chamber of Horrors) – Mr. Rae
- Queen Mary I (wax figure from Chamber of Horrors) – Miss Grundy
- Two mysterious fiddlers – John D'Auban and John Warde
- Ferdinando (Sicilian nobleman) – Miss Henri
- Bertuccio (Sicilian nobleman) – Miss Lister
- Lady Abbess – Miss Wood
- Princess Isabella – Lilian Hastings
- Principal dancer – Anna Bossi

== Musical numbers ==
The musical numbers used in the piece consist of lyrics by Gilbert to existing music as noted below:

- "Oh dear – oh dear – his soup is vermicelli" – Chorus (Meyerbeer, Robert le diable, "Versiamo a tazza piena")
- "Before I sing, my cap I circulate" – Raimbault (Hérold, Le pré aux clercs, "Les rendezvous de Noble Compagnie")
- "Soon my falchion, so tempered and trusty" – Robert, Raimbault, Bertram (Bellini, I Capuleti e i Montecchi, "La tremenda ultrice spada", and Trad. "Hunting the Hare")
- "One, two, three, four" – Alice, Bertram, Robert, Raimbault, Gobetto (Offenbach, "Bibi-Bamban" and "Ah! Quelles étaient bonnes les pommes")
- "One moment more, and then you know" – Robert, Isabella, Alice, Raimbault (Marc Chautagne, "Le château de Caoutchou")
- "Oh, he's tricky – tricky – tricky – tricky – trick – tricked him" – Robert, Bertram, Raimbault, Gobetto, Alice (Offenbach, L'île de Tulipatan, "Et dig et dig et dig et don," and finale)
- "We're only wax-work" – Chourus of wax figures (Bellini, La sonnambula, "A fosco cielo")
- "Oh, animosity and villainous verbosity" – Robert, Bertram, Gobetto (Daniel Auber, Le dieu et la Bayadère)
- "Pity me, Robert, now you know" – Robert and Bertram (Trad. "My Father's Farm" and "Miller's Legacy")
- Finale: "Among the dead men down you go" – Company (Offenbach, La Grande-Duchesse de Gérolstein, "Logeons-le donc et dès ce soir")

Other items listed in the programme were:

- Hervé, L'œil crevé, "Allons gaies chasseurs"
- Robillard, Le trouvaille du p'tit Ivon
- Offenbach, Les bavards
- Offenbach, Barbe-bleue, "Proclamation de Popolani"
- Jules Javelot, "Mon Oscar"

Songs for these numbers are not printed in the libretto. They may have formed the Grand Ballet, performed at the beginning of the last scene, before "Pity me, Robert, now you know".
