= John Hollingshead =

English theatre producer, journalist and writer (1827–1904)

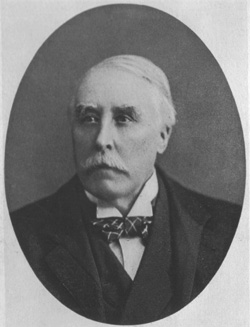
John Hollingshead in 1895

John Hollingshead (9 September 1827 – 9 October 1904) was an English theatrical impresario, journalist and writer during the latter half of the 19th century. After a journalism career, Hollingshead managed the Alhambra Theatre and was later the first manager of the Gaiety Theatre, London. Hollingshead also wrote several books during his life.

An innovative producer, Hollingshead brought Gilbert and Sullivan together in 1871 to produce their first joint work, a musical extravaganza called Thespis. Among other theatrical works that he produced, he mounted a long series of popular Victorian burlesques at the Gaiety, engaging Meyer Lutz to compose original scores for them. He also produced operettas, plays and other works. These productions made stars of Nellie Farren and several others. At the Gaiety, in 1878, Hollingshead was the first theatre manager to light his auditorium with electric lights.

== Life and career ==
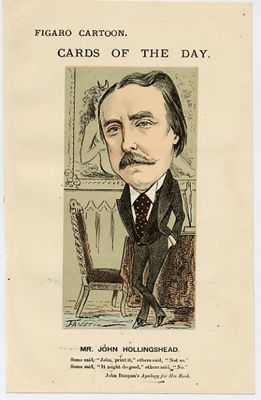
Hollingshead in an 1870 cartoon

Hollingshead was born in Hoxton, Greater London, the son of Henry Randall Hollingshead. He was educated at Homerton. He first worked as a bookkeeper for a soft goods company in London in the early 1850s while publishing political essays on finance and social reform. He soon entered into a partnership as a clothing merchant. During this time, Hollingshead and his friend Moy Thomas began publishing a penny paper called The Mail that proved unsuccessful. In 1854, he decided to close his clothing business and begin working as a writer full-time. By 1855, Hollingshead was married with two children. He died in London on 9 October 1904 at the age of 77.

=== Journalist and author ===
Hollingshead started his journalism career in 1854 under the tutelage of Charles Dickens at Household Words magazine and then under W. M. Thackeray at Cornhill Magazine. In 1861, he acted as the "special correspondent" for The Morning Post during the London famine. He also wrote essays, short stories and dramatic criticism. Beginning in 1864, and for several years thereafter, he contributed to Punch magazine, mostly writing on political topics related to social reform. He advocated the principles of Mill and Jeremy Bentham. One of his best-known essays was an 1857 piece called "The City of Unlimited Paper", which became famous during the monetary panic of 1857. In the 1860s he was on the staff of Good Words under Norman Macleod as editor.

Hollingshead wrote a number of books from the 1850s into the 1860s, including On the canal: a narrative of a voyage from London to Birmingham (1858); Under Bow Bells (1860, a collection of some of his essays), Rubbing the Gilt Off (a collection of his early political essays (1860) Odd Journeys (1860, a collection of travels), Ways of Life (1861, a volume of humorous papers), Ragged London (1861, a collection of his reports for the Morning Post), and Underground London (1862). Other publications included a collection of humorous stories entitled Rough Diamonds and two volumes of miscellaneous essays called Today. He also wrote plays.

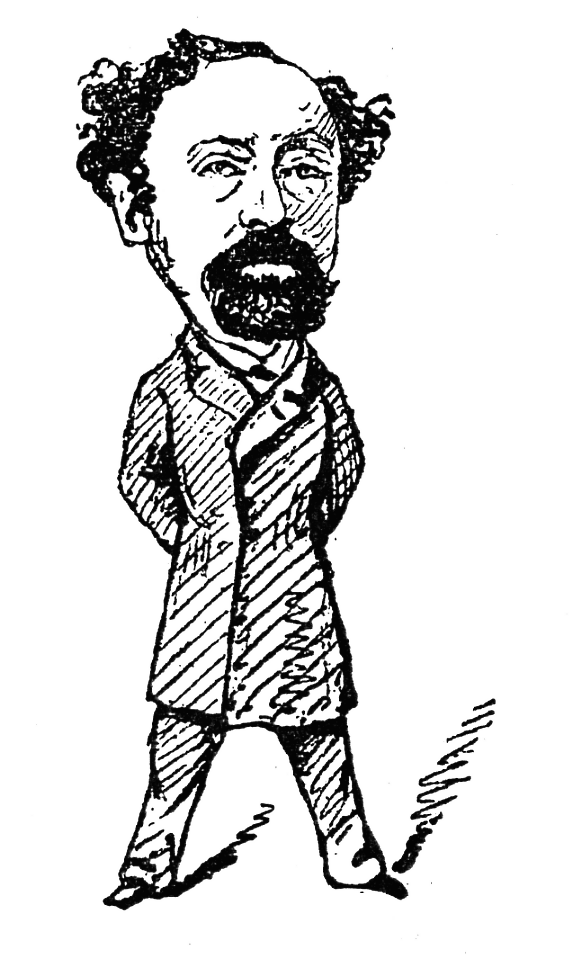
Hollingshead in 1898

In the 1880s, Hollingshead returned to writing, producing books mostly about the theatre, including Plain English (1880), and Footlights (1883). Beginning in the 1890s, he wrote a number of memoirs and more books about the theatres that he had managed. In 1892, he also published The Story of Leicester Square, tracing the history, geography and architecture of the London neighbourhood from earliest times through the date of publication. His memoir entitled My Lifetime, published in 1895, explores his life and career through that date.

=== Producer and theatre manager ===
==== The Alhambra Theatre and theatrical innovations ====
In the 1860s, Hollingshead turned to theatre management. He helped establish the Alhambra Theatre and was the stage manager there from 1865 to 1868, in addition to producing musical pieces and ballets there. He made it famous for its sumptuous staging, alluring corps de ballet and the notorious front-of-house Promenade bar, where the young ladies of the ballet hinted at more than terpsichorean pleasure.

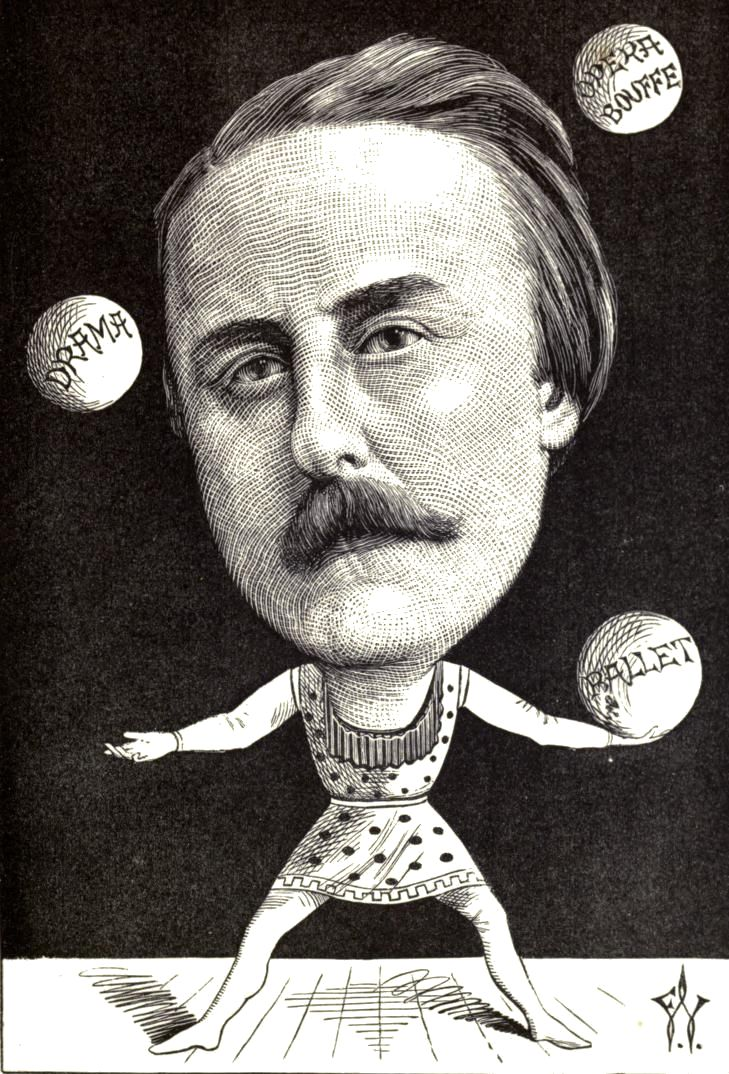
So he plays his part as drawn by Frederick Waddy (1872)

During his tenure at the Alhambra, Hollingshead introduced London audiences to the Can-Can. Hollingshead is also credited with inventing the practice of holding general matinées. Hollingshead was one of the first London theatre managers to eliminate fees for programmes and coat check.

He left the Alhambra to manage the newly redesigned Gaiety Theatre. In addition, Hollingshead managed shows at the Opera Comique from time to time. He produced a revival of Gilbert's Princess Toto there in 1881, paired with Rutland Barrington's short play, Quid Pro Quo.

==== The Gaiety Theatre ====
In 1868, Hollingshead took over the Gaiety Theatre, which had been a large music hall. The auditorium was rebuilt and, under Hollingshead, it became a venue primarily for musical burlesque, variety, continental operetta, including several operettas by Jacques Offenbach, and light comedy, under Hollingshead's management, from 1868 to 1886. The theatre opened on 21 December 1868, with the successful Robert the Devil, by W. S. Gilbert, a burlesque of the opera Robert le Diable. Gilbert also wrote An Old Score for the theatre in 1869. Another early production was Alfred Thompson's Columbus!, or the Original Pitch in a Merry Key (1869). Nellie Farren starred in both Columbus and Robert the Devil. She continued as "Principal Boy" at the Gaiety for the next 25 years, first under Hollingshead and then under George Edwardes. Other Gaiety stalwarts were Edward Terry, Kate Vaughan and Fred Leslie. The theatre's music director, Meyer Lutz, composed or arranged the music for many of its most successful burlesques.

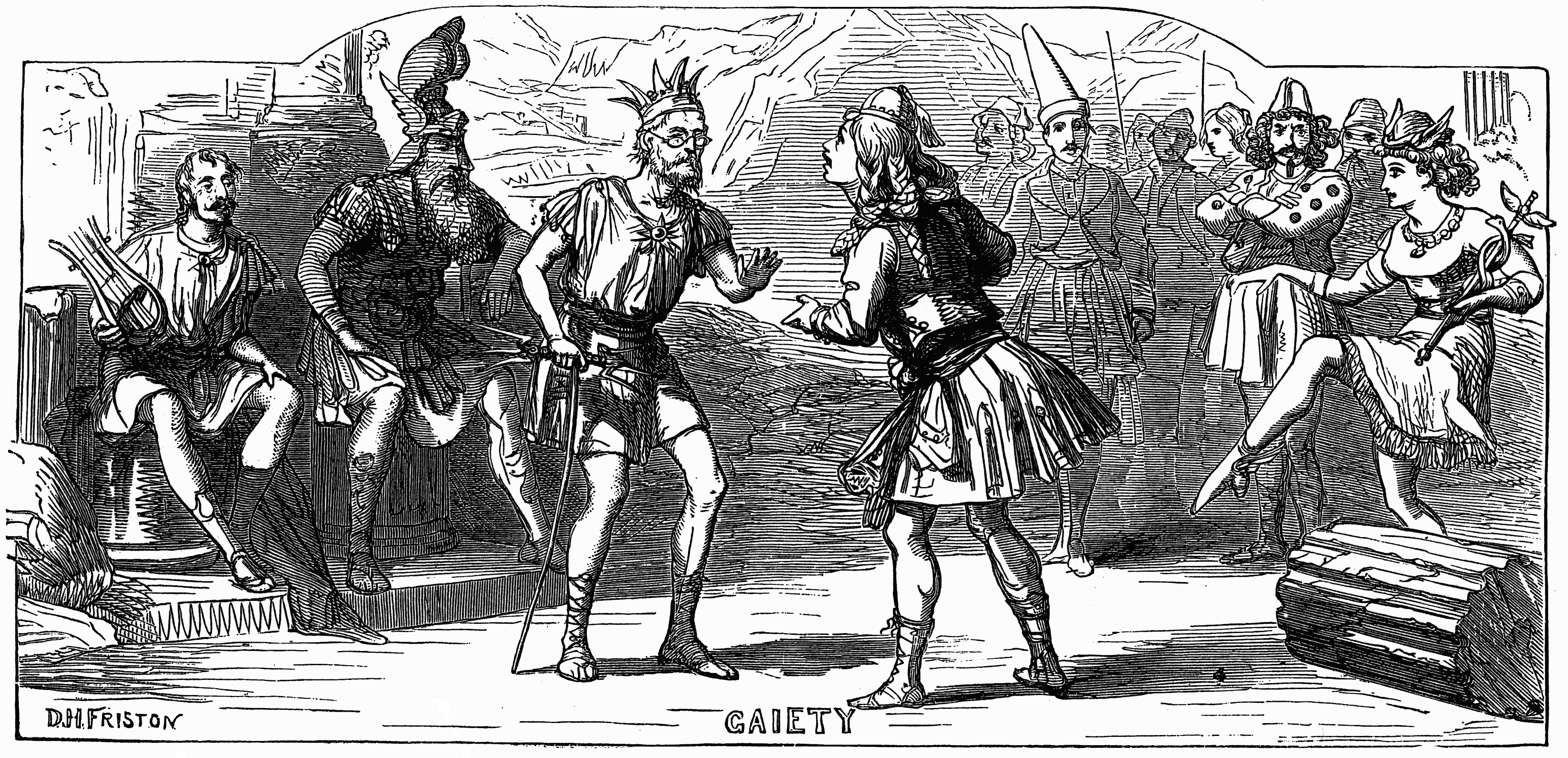
Illustration of Thespis, the first Gilbert and Sullivan work

In 1870, Henry James Byron's Uncle Dick's Darling starred a young Henry Irving. This was the last play that theatre buff Charles Dickens saw before his death. Other pieces at Hollingshead's Gaiety in 1870 included Dot (Dion Boucicault's version of The Cricket on the Hearth); and The Princess of Trebizonde, based on the Jacques Offenbach operetta (1870). Thespis, the first collaboration between Gilbert and Sullivan, played at the theatre in 1871, with Farren as Mercury and J. L. Toole in the title role. Offenbach's Les deux aveugles played in 1872, starring Fred Sullivan. This was followed by such works as Shilly-Shally (1872) by Anthony Trollope and Charles Reade; Antony and Cleopatra (1873); and The Battle of Life, (based on Charles Dickens's Christmas story of that title). Two other Dion Boucicault plays produced by Hollingshead's company in the early 1870s were Night and Morning and Led Astray. Boucicault's Don Caesar de Bazan was travestied in Byron's Little Don Caesar de Bazan.

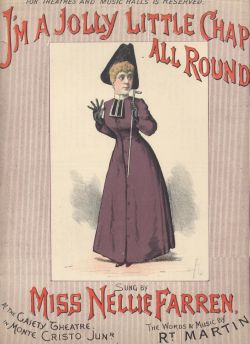
Sheet music from Monte Cristo Jr.

In the late 1870s, the theatre became the first to install electric lighting on its auditorium. Hollingshead's productions there included The Bohemian G-yurl and the Unapproachable Pole (1877), Byron's farce Little Doctor Faust (1878) Byron's Handsome Hernani, or The Fatal Penny-Whistle (1879); and Robbing Roy (1879). Meyer Lutz's Ali Baba and The Forty Thieves was performed in 1880 (Hollingshead had produced a highly successful charity production called The Forty Thieves at the Gaiety in 1878), and a burlesque of Aladdin, by Robert Reece, in 1881. These were followed by Little Robin Hood (1882), a burlesque by Reece, Blue Beard (1882), Ariel (1883, by F. C. Burnand, based on The Tempest), Don Yuan, Byron's Little Don Caesar de Bazan (a send-up of Boucicault's play), Mazeppa (1884), Little Jack Sheppard (1885), Monte Cristo Jr. (1886), and dozens of others. John D'Auban choreographed the Gaiety burlesques from 1868. In addition to these burlesques, the theatre produced comedies such as Congreve's Love for Love, Vanbrugh's Relapse, The Grasshopper (1877, an adaptation by Hollingshead of Henri Meilhac and Ludovic Halévy's La Cigale), and a number of farces.

Nevertheless, burlesque and risque operettas were the normal fare at the Gaiety. Hollingshead called himself a "licensed dealer in legs, short skirts, French adaptations, Shakespeare, taste and musical glasses." In 1886, George Edwards took over the lease to the Gaiety.
