= Extravaganza =

Elaborate, spectacular, and expensive theatrical production

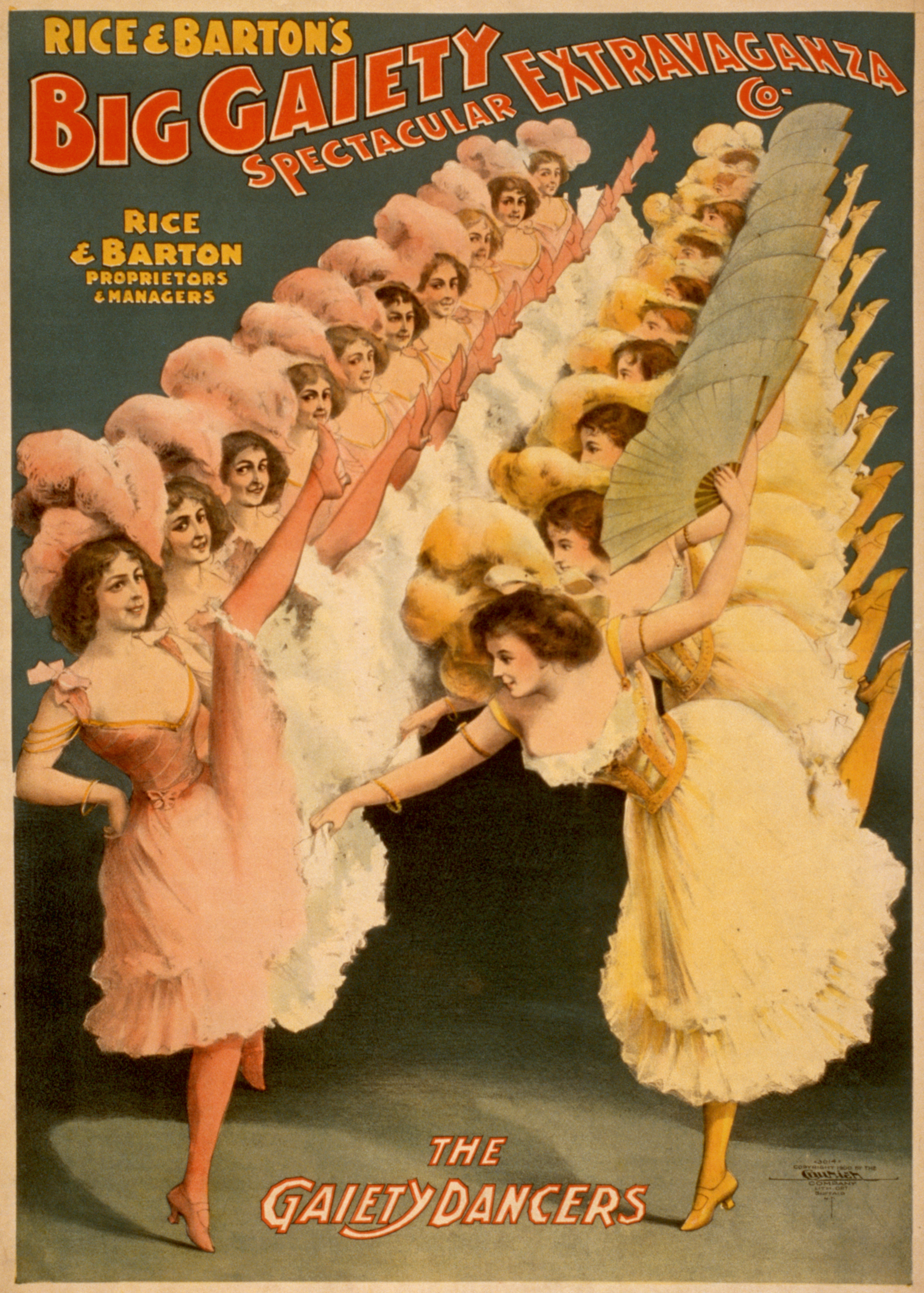
A poster showing the chorus girls of a 1900 extravaganza.

An extravaganza is a literary or musical work (often musical theatre) usually containing elements of Victorian burlesque, and pantomime, in a spectacular production and characterized by freedom of style and structure. The term is derived from the Italian word stravaganza, meaning extravagance. It sometimes also has elements of music hall, cabaret, circus, revue, variety, vaudeville and mime. Extravaganza came, in the 20th century, to more broadly refer to an elaborate, spectacular, and expensive theatrical production.

== Descriptions ==
Professor Carolyn Wiliams writes that playwrights, producers and critics have often muddled the distinction between burlesque and extravaganza, but she describes the genre this way: "Sexy yet free of 'offensive vulgarity', silly yet intelligent, raucus yet spectacularly beautiful, extravaganza was a relatively "high" form of burlesque, intended for an urbane adult audience." She notes that the definition of extravaganza changed during the 19th century, in that a late century extravaganza had a "transformation scene", but earlier it focused on the sexy innuendo and fantasy, often involving fairies, and did not necessarily include a transformation scene. 19th-century British dramatist, James Planché, who was known for his extravaganzas, defined the genre as "the whimsical treatment of a poetical subject."

In 1881, Percy Fitzgerald described the classic transformation scene as follows:

First the "gauzes" lift slowly one behind the other – perhaps the most pleasing of all scenic effects – giving glimpses of "the Realms of Bliss", seen behind in a tantalizing fashion. Then is revealed a kind of half-glorified country, clouds and banks, evidently concealing much. Always a sort of pathetic and at the same time exultant [musical] strain rises. ... Now some of the banks begin to part slowly, showing realms of light, with a few divine beings – fairies – rising slowly here and there [in an aerial pyramid]. ... [T]he lights streaming on full, in every colour and from every quarter, in the richest effulgence. [Finally], the most glorious paradise of all will open, revealing the pure empyrean itself, and some fair spirit aloft in a cloud among the stars, the apex of all. Then, all motion ceases; the work is complete; the fumes of crimson, green and blue fire begin to rise at the wings; the music bursts into a crash of exultation; and, possibly to the general disenchantment, a burly man in a black frock steps out from the side and bows awkwardly. Then to shrill whistle, the first scene of the harlequinade closes in, and shuts out the brilliant vision. [These magnificent scenes] are significant of English energy, and cannot be approached in foreign theatres.

== See also ==
- Spectacle
- Victorian burlesque
