= Soutar =

Soutar is a surname. It has Scottish origins. Notable people with the surname include:

- Alan Soutar (born 1978), Scottish darts player
- Charles Soutar (1920–2016), RAF air marshal and doctor
- Derek Soutar (born 1981), Scottish footballer
- Fabian Soutar (born 1986), New Zealand rugby player
- Farren Soutar (1870–1962), English actor and singer
- John Soutar (1881–1951), British architect
- Mike Soutar (born 1967), Scottish entrepreneur
- Robert Soutar (1830–1908), English actor, comedian, stage manager, writer and theatre director
- Tom Soutar (1893–1981), Australian athlete and footballer
- William Soutar (1898–1943), Scottish poet
- Zac Soutar (born 1997), Australian racing driver

== See also ==
- Souter
- Souttar
