= The Forty Thieves =

1878 English pantomime

Illustration of the Harlequinade in The Forty Thieves, showing Swell, Pantaloon, Harlequin, Columbine (above), Clown and Policeman

The Forty Thieves is a "Pantomime Burlesque" written by Robert Reece, W. S. Gilbert, F. C. Burnand and Henry J. Byron, created in 1878 as a charity benefit, produced by the Beefsteak Club of London. The Beefsteak Club still meets in Irving Street, London. It was founded by actor John Lawrence Toole and others in 1876, in rooms above the Folly Theatre, William IV Street. It became an essential after theatre club for the bohemian theatre set, such as Henry Irving, Toole, John Hare, W. H. Kendal, F. C. Burnand, Henry Labouchère, W. S. Gilbert and two hundred of their peers. It soon moved to Green Street. The Club occasionally performed amateur plays for their own amusement and to raise funds for charities.

The story of Ali Baba and the Forty Thieves was a popular subject for pantomime. This entertainment was first produced at the Gaiety Theatre by its proprietor, John Hollingshead (also a member of the Club), as the Wednesday matinee on 13 February 1878. Robert Soutar (Nellie Farren's husband) acted as director/stage manager, with John D'Auban choreographing the Harlequinade that was played at the end of the pantomime. Meyer Lutz conducted the music. Hollingshead secured the services of the professional female actors, the male amateur actors, the distinguished writers, Hollingshead later remembered, "[T]he gem of the performance was the grimly earnest and determined Harlequin of W. S. Gilbert. It gave me an idea of what Oliver Cromwell would have made of the character."

Proceeds from the first performance of the piece were 700 pounds sterling, owing to a sell-out charity crowd paying enhanced prices. The Prince and Princess of Wales and many other dignitaries attended. Most of the proceeds were given to the Royal General Theatrical Fund and some to hospitals. The entertainment was presented again, with similar success, at Brighton on 9 March 1878 and again at the Gaiety on 10 April, to benefit wives and children of seamen killed in the sinking of HMS Eurydice.

== Roles and cast ==
The male cast members were amateur actors who were members of The Beefsteak Club. The female cast members were professional actresses.

- Ali Baba (a Woodcutter) – Captain Arthur Gooch
- Ganem (his Son) – W. F. Quintin (Quintin Twiss)
- Cassim (his Brother) – Algernon Bastard
- Hassarac (Captain of the Forty Thieves) – Joseph Maclean (the only male non-member of the Beefsteak Club)
- Abdallah (his Lieutenant) – Mr. Colnaghi (Helen Barry in trousers)
- Mesrour – F. H. McCalmont
- Gentlemen of "The Forty" (The Deserving Hanging Committee): (portrayed by:) William Yardley, Leslie Ward, Gilbert Farquhar, Hon. F. Parker, W. Higgins, Major Rolls, Archibald Stuart-Wortley, E. Darell, J. Westropp, J. Cumming, C. Ringrose, C. Daly, Hugh Drummond, J. Graham, Cecil Chapman, A. B. Cook, Benson, Amphlett and Hon. C. Vivian
- Morgiana – Lydia Thompson
- Cogia – Eleanor Bufton
- The Good Fairy – Lucy Buckstone
- Twenty young ladies from the Alhambra Theatre

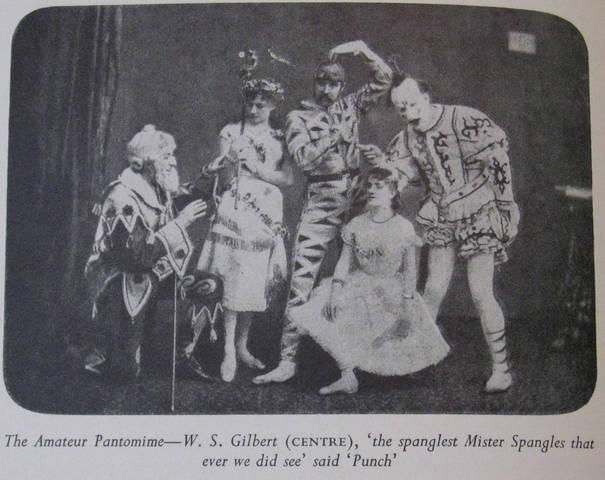
Photograph of the Harlequinade, with W. S. Gilbert as Harlequin

Characters in The Harlequinade

- Clown – William Gerald Elliot
- Pantaloon – Thomas Knox Holmes
- Columbine – Mdlle. Rosa
- Harlequin – W. S. Gilbert
- Swell – Lord De Clifford
- Tailor – W. F. Quinton
- Butterman – C. Ringrose
- Baker – L. Ward
- Sweep – W. Higgins
- Waiter – J. Westropp
- Ung Mossoo – Algernon Bastard
- Policeman – Captain H. E. Colvile
- Artist – Leslie Ward
- Bricklayer – J. Graham
- Butcher – C. Chapman
- A Gent – A. B. Cook
- Old Woman – F. H. McCalmont

== Synopsis ==
Ali Baba

- Scene 1. Written by Robert Reece – Exterior of Ali Baba's House
- Scene 2. Written by W. S. Gilbert – The Wood
- Scene 3. Written by F. C. Burnand – Interior of Ali Baba's House
- Scene 4. Written by H. J. Byron – The Cave

The Transformation

The Harlequinade

- Scene 1. A Quiet Street
- Scene 2. An Equally Quiet Bedroom
