= Tam o' Shanter (poem) =

1790 poem by Robert Burns

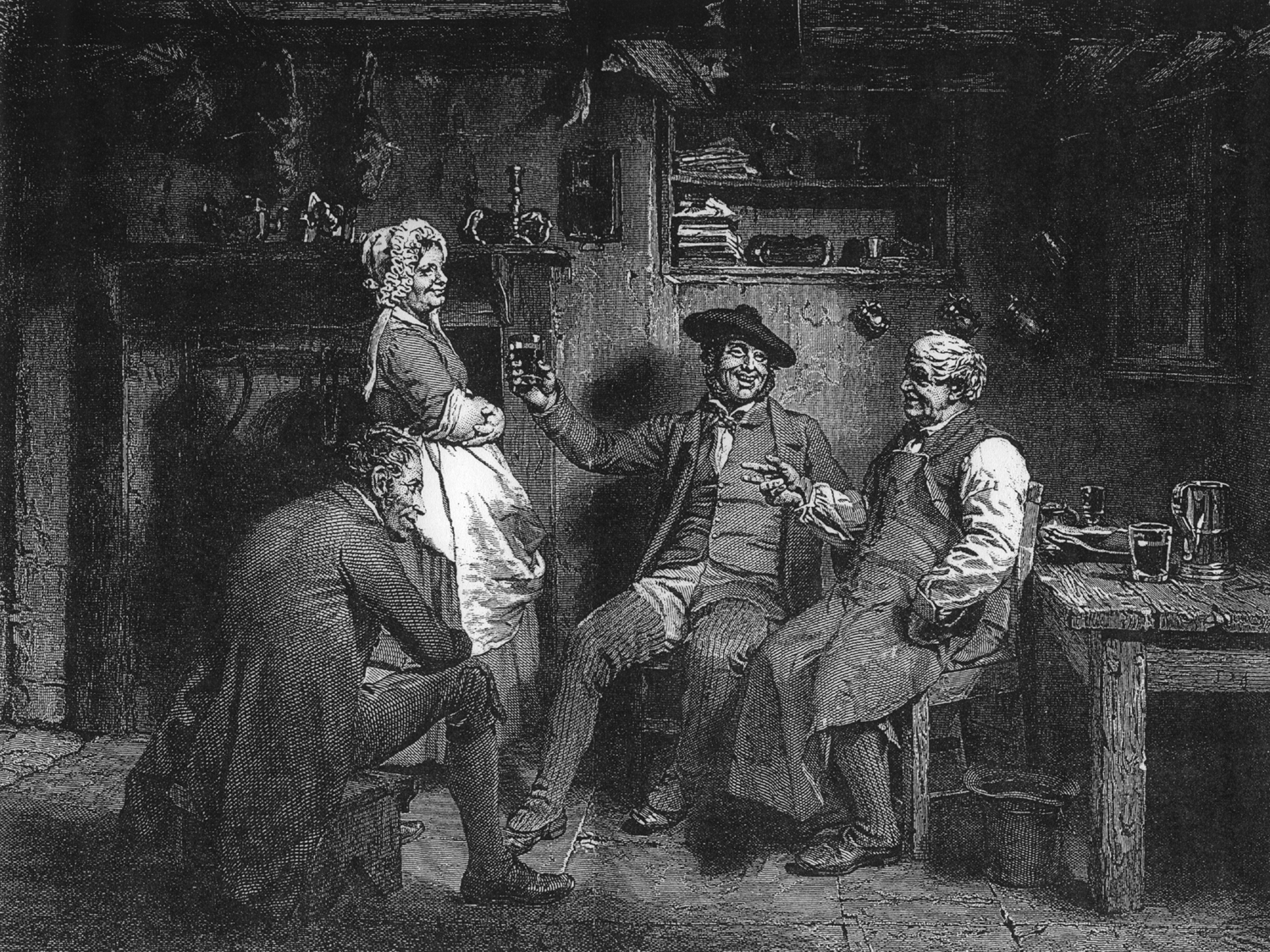
The opening scene of the poem: Tam drinks with his shoemaker friend, souter Johnnie, and flirts with the pub landlady while the landlord laughs at Johnnie's tales.

"Tam o' Shanter" is a narrative poem written by the Scottish poet Robert Burns in 1790, while living in Dumfries. First published in the second volume of Francis Grose's Antiquities of Scotland in 1791, at 228 (or 224) lines it is one of Burns' longer poems, and employs a mixture of Scots and English.

The poem describes the habits of Tam (a Scots nickname for Thomas), a farmer who often gets drunk with his friends in a public house in the Scottish town of Ayr, and his thoughtless ways, specifically towards his wife, who waits at home for him. After one late-night revel, following a market day, Tam rides home drunk on his horse Meg while a storm is brewing. On the way he sees the local haunted church of Alloway Kirk lit up, with witches and warlocks dancing and the Devil playing the bagpipes. He is amazed to see the place bedecked with gruesome objects, including gibbet irons and knives used to commit murders. The music intensifies as the witches dance and, seeing one witch in a short dress, Tam loses his reason and shouts, '"Weel done, cutty-sark!" ("weel": well; "cutty-sark": short shirt). Immediately, the lights go out, the music and dancing stop, and many of the creatures lunge after Tam, with the witches leading. Tam turns and flees, driving his horse towards the River Doon as the creatures dare not cross a running stream. The witches come close enough that they pull Meg's tail off just as she reaches the Brig o' Doon.

== Summary ==
The poem begins:

When chapman billies leave the street,
And drouthy neibors, neibors, meet;
As market days are wearing late,
And folk begin to tak the gate,
While we sit bousing at the nappy,
An' getting fou and unco happy,
We think na on the lang Scots miles,
The mosses, waters, slaps and stiles,
That lie between us and our hame,
Where sits our sulky, sullen dame,
Gathering her brows like gathering storm,
Nursing her wrath to keep it warm.

Burns locates us geographically in Ayr (with a line that gave Ayr United F.C. their nickname "the honest men"):

(Auld Ayr, wham ne'er a town surpasses,
For honest men and bonnie lasses).

Tam's wife Kate comments on his drinking escapades, and shares her dark forebodings:

She prophesied that late or soon,
Thou wad be found, deep drown'd in Doon,
Or catch'd wi' warlocks in the mirk,
By Alloway's auld, haunted kirk.

Such advice is too often dismissed:

Ah, gentle dames! it gars me greet,
To think how mony counsels sweet,
How mony lengthen'd, sage advices,
The husband frae the wife despises!

One market night, Tam sits in a pub, close to its ingle, and drinks with his thirsty friend, a souter: "Souter Johnny, his ancient, trusty, drouthy crony". Tam flirts with the landlady of the pub, while Johnny's tales are punctuated by the landlord's laughter. Eventually Tam rides off on his grey mare Meg, for his long, dark, lonely ride home. Burns emphasises the spooky character of the Ayrshire countryside Tam has to ride through—but it is much easier as he is drunk:

Inspiring bold John Barleycorn!
What dangers thou canst make us scorn!
Wi' tippenny, we fear nae evil;
Wi' usquabae, we'll face the devil!

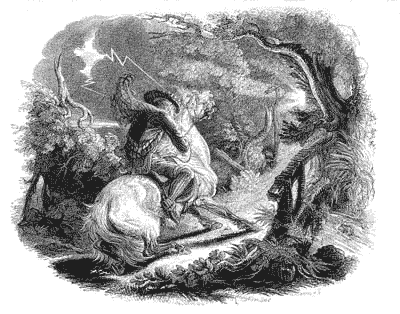
Contemporary woodcut showing Tam wearing his bonnet and sitting astride his horse Meg

With the scene set, suddenly: "wow! Tam saw an unco sight!"

The sight he sees is Alloway Kirk, ablaze with light, where a weird hallucinatory dance involving witches and warlocks, open coffins, and the Devil himself is in full swing. The scene includes morbidly enthusiastic Gothic detail. Tam watches silently until, after the dancing witches have cast off most of their clothes, he is beguiled by the energetic leaping of one witch, Nannie, whose sark (shift or chemise) is too cutty (short) and scanty.) He cannot help shouting out in passion:

Weel done, Cutty-sark!
And in an instant all was dark:

The Devil decides to chase Tam, but his pride in the ability of his horse is justified as she is able to help him to "win the key-stone o' the brig". (The Devil, witches and warlocks cannot cross running water.) They only just escape, as Nannie, first among the "hellish legion" chasing, grabs the horse's tail, which comes off.

In tongue-in-cheek moralistic mode, the poem concludes:

Now, wha this tale o' truth shall read,
Ilk man and mother's son, take heed:
Whene'er to Drink you are inclin'd,
Or Cutty-sarks rin in your mind,
Think ye may buy the joys o'er dear;
Remember Tam o' Shanter's mare

== Background ==
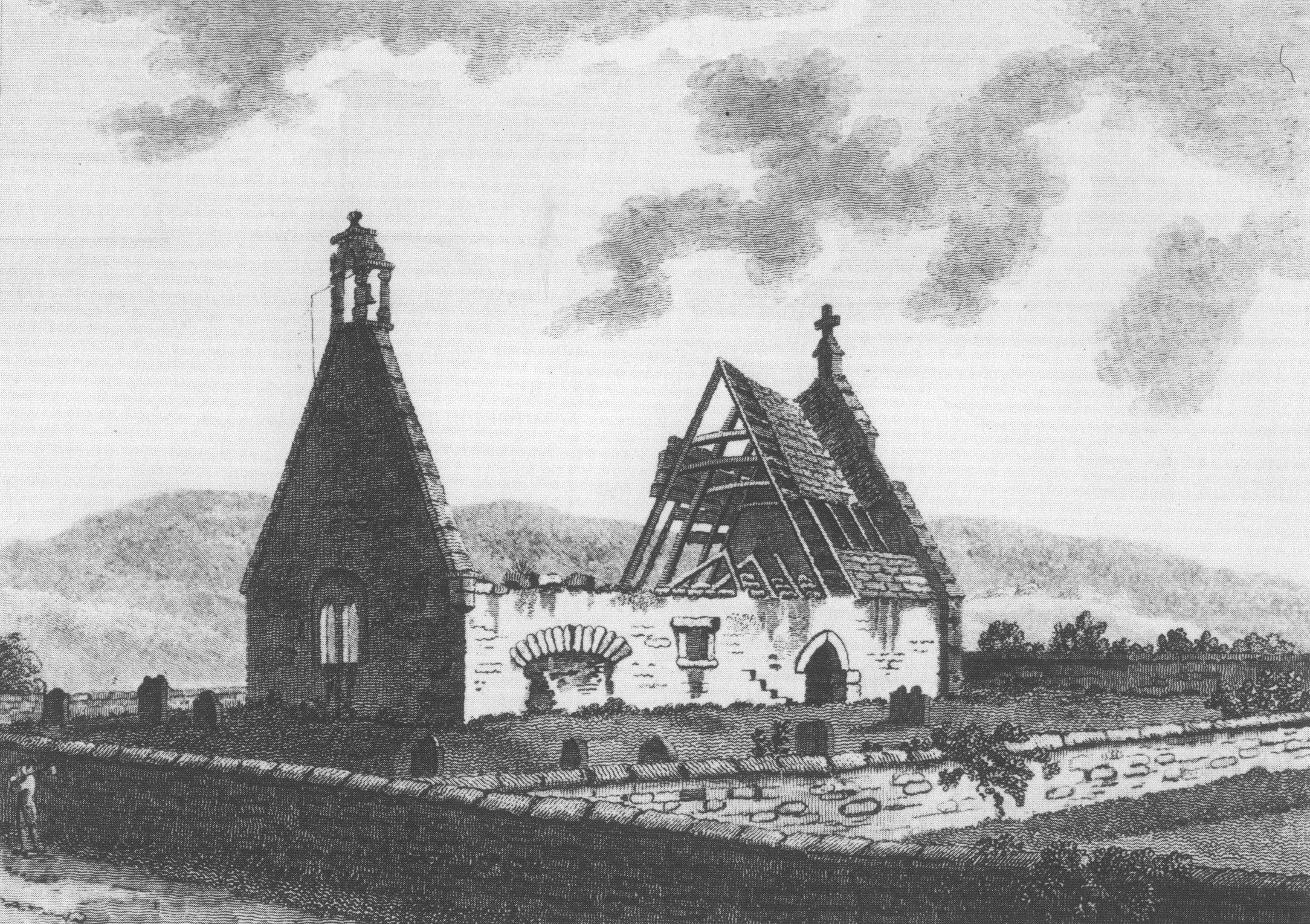
Alloway Kirk, from Grose's Antiquities Of Scotland, 1797.

The poem was written in 1790 for the second volume of Francis Grose's Antiquities of Scotland. A month before this was published, it first appeared in the Edinburgh Herald and the Edinburgh Magazine in March 1791. Robert Riddell introduced Burns to Grose and, according to Gilbert Burns, the poet asked the antiquarian to include a drawing of Alloway Kirk when he came to Ayrshire; Grose agreed, as long as Burns gave him something to print alongside it.

Burns wrote to Grose in June 1790, giving him three witch stories associated with Alloway Kirk, two of which he said were "authentic", the third, "though equally true, being not so well identified as the two former with regard to the scene". The second of the stories concerned Tam o' Shanter. Burns described it to Grose as follows:

On a market-day, in the town of Ayr, a farmer from Carrick, and consequently whose way lay by the very gate of Alloway kirk-yard, in order to cross the River Doon, at the old bridge, which is almost two or three hundred yards farther on than the said old gate, had been detained by his business till by the time he reached Alloway it was the wizard hour, between night and morning.

Though he was terrified with a blaze streaming from the kirk, yet as it is a well known fact, that to turn back on these occasions is running by far the greatest risk of mischief, he prudently advanced on his road. When he had reached the gate of the kirk-yard, he was surprised and entertained, thorough the ribs and arches of an old gothic window which still faces the highway, to see a dance of witches merrily footing it round their old sooty black-guard master, who was keeping them all alive with the power of his bagpipe. The farmer stopping his horse to observe them a little, could plainly desern the faces of many old women of his acquaintance and neighbourhood. How the gentleman was dressed, tradition does not say; but the ladies were all in their smocks; and one of them happening unluckily to have a smock which was considerably too short to answer all the purpose of that piece of dress, our farmer was so tickled that he involuntarily burst out, with a loud laugh, 'Weel luppen, Maggy wi' the short sark!' and recollecting himself, instantly spurred his horse to the top of his speed. I need not mention the universally known fact, that no diabolical power can pursue you beyond the middle of a running stream. Lucky it was for the poor farmer that the river Doon was so near, for notwithstanding the speed of his horse, which was a good one, against he reached the middle of the arch of the bridge and consequently the middle of the stream, the pursuing, vengeful hags were so close at his heels, that one of them actually sprung to seize him: but it was too late; nothing was on her side of the stream but the horse's tail, which immediately gave way to her infernal grip, as if blasted by a stroke of lightning; but the farmer was beyond her reach. However, the unsightly, tailless condition of the vigorous steed was to the last hours of the noble creature's life, an awful warning to the Carrick farmers, not to stay too late in Ayr markets.

Thus began what was to be one of Burns' most sustained poetic efforts.

A story that the poem was written in a day was perpetrated by John Gibson Lockhart, aided by Allan Cunningham. Its subtle nuances of tempo, pace and tone suggest that it had been given, as Burns told Mrs Dunlop on 11 April 1791, "a finishing polish that I despair of ever excelling".

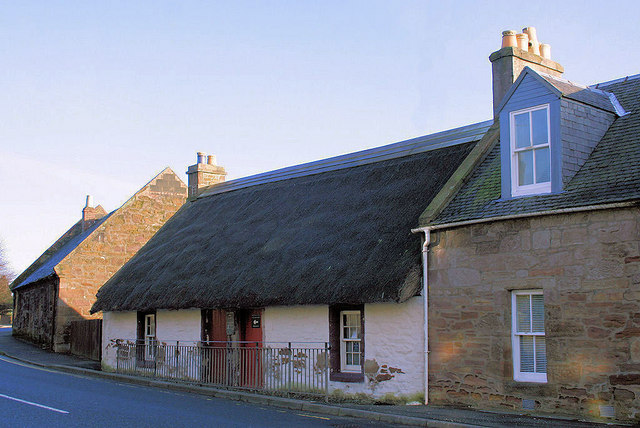
Souter Johnnie's Cottage, Kirkoswald.

Burns based the character of Tam o' Shanter on Douglas Graham (1739–1811), a friend who lived at Shanter Farm, about half a mile (0.8 km) inland from the fishing village of Maidens in South Ayrshire, near Kirkoswald.

The Kirkoswald souter (shoemaker) John Davidson gave Burns inspiration for the character of Souter Johnnie. In 1785, Davidson had built his own cottage there, accommodating his family and business dealings, with his workshop at the back. He died in 1806. His family passed the cottage on to the National Trust for Scotland in 1932. It is preserved as a rare example of thatched roofed domestic architecture, and forms a museum and art gallery.

== Revision ==
An early version of the poem includes four lines that were deleted at the request of one of Burns' friends. The poem originally contained the lines:

Three lawyers' tongues, turn'd inside out,
Wi' lies seam'd like a beggar's clout;
Three priests' hearts, rotten black as muck,
Lay stinking, vile in every neuk.

Early-20th-century tobacco advertisement using an image of Tam

A handwritten note on the manuscript written by Judge Alexander Fraser Tytler, reads "Burns left out these four lines at my desire, as being incongruous with the other circumstances of pure horror." Burns had the lines removed from later editions; it was not unknown for Burns to make changes at the request of friends.

== Cultural depictions ==
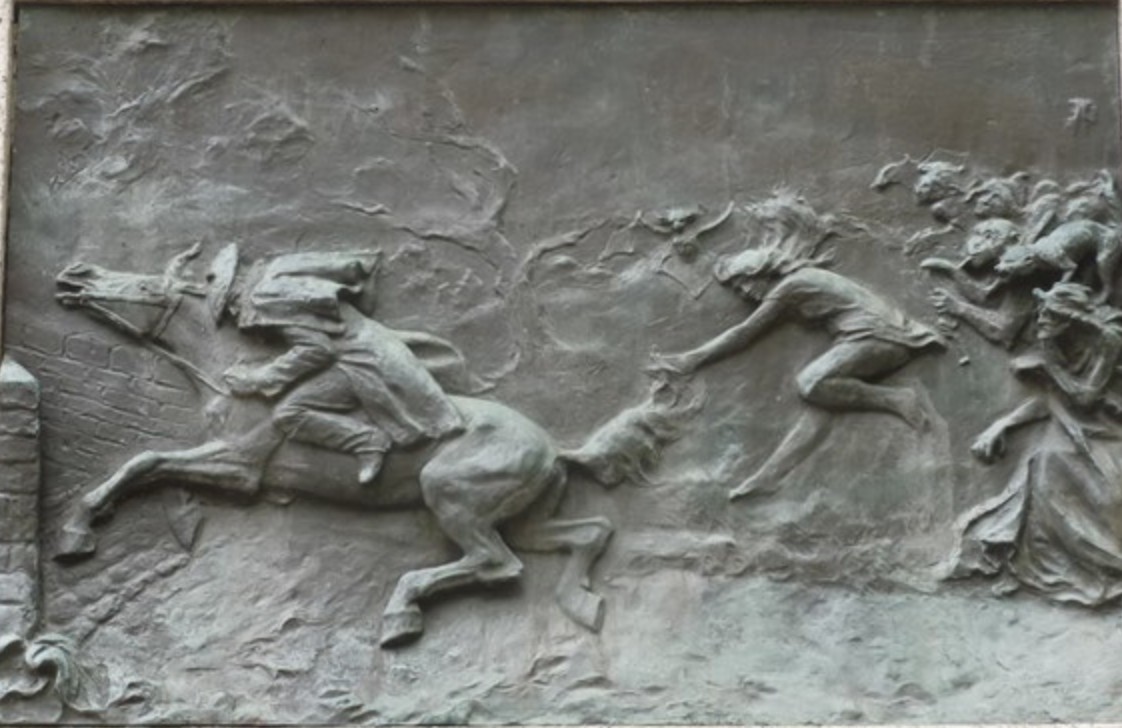
Tam o' Shanter's Ride, Robbie Burns Statue, Victoria Park, Halifax, Nova Scotia

This poem appears to be the first mention of the name.The tam o' shanter cap is named after it.

The French Romantic painter Eugène Delacroix based his 1825 painting Tam O'Shanter on the poem. Ada Lovelace named her beloved if "very wild and ... quite vicious" stallion Tom O'Shanter.

George Métivier published "Tam au Sabbat", a Guernésiais version of Burns' poem, in La Gazette de Guernesey in 1855. This version was included in his collection Fantaisies guernesiaises in 1866.

In 1899 the town of Barre, Vermont, United States, erected a memorial to Burns in local granite, including a panel depicting a scene from the poem.

In 1915 the American composer George Whitefield Chadwick completed a symphonic poem inspired by the poem.

In 1955 the British composer Malcolm Arnold's Overture Op. 51a was named "Tam O'Shanter" after Burns' poem.

In his 1975 collection Selected Poems, the Scottish writer Cliff Hanley (under the pseudonym 'Ebenezer McIlwham') wrote a facetious sequel to "Tam O'Shanter", called "The Touchstane". The protagonist, Theophile McIvor, is not afraid of the ghosts and witches, and takes them on, saying "McIvor comes fae Whifflet, no' fae Ayr."

In the 1990s the Scottish figurative painter Alexander Goudie worked on a cycle of 54 large format paintings dedicated to Robert Burns' poem. They are currently displayed at Rozelle House Galleries, near Burns' home at Alloway, Ayrshire.

The Tam O' Shanter Urban Cottage on Bidston Hill in Merseyside, England was named after the poem in 1837 after being built beyond a stream which was said to repel witches. It attracts both Burns fans and local witches and Wicca historians.

The Tam O'Shanter Inn in Los Angeles was named after the poem and was established in 1922 by the Van de Kamp bakery family. As of 2017, it is Los Angeles' oldest restaurant operated by the same family in the same location. It was Walt Disney's favourite restaurant.

"The Number of the Beast" by Iron Maiden is loosely based on the poem.

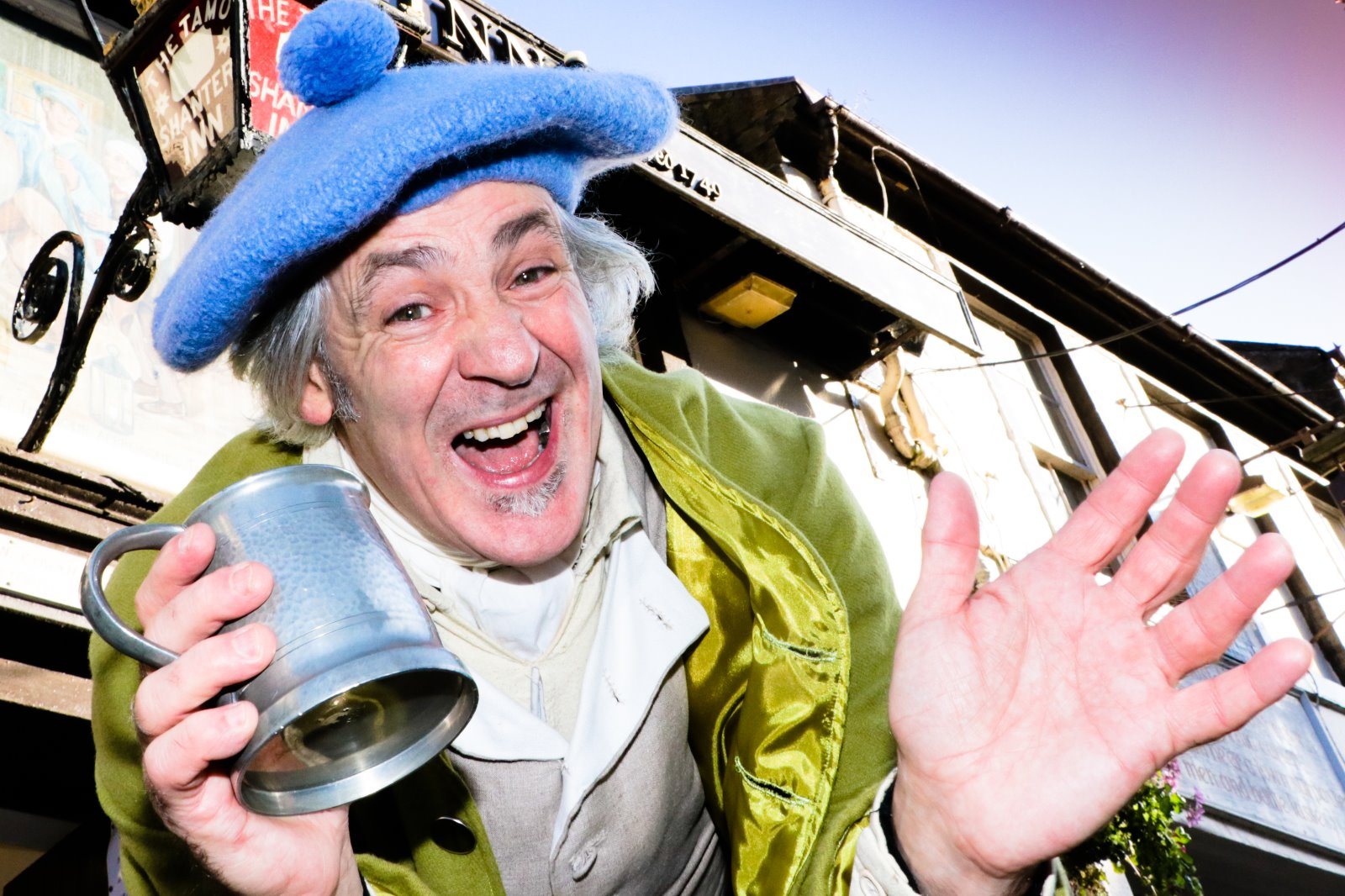
The actor Ken O'Harrah plays Tam O'Shanter at Tamfest 2019

Tamfest in Ayr, which honours Tam O'Shanter, is dedicated to a friend of Burns, Douglas Graham. The festival was founded in 2015 by musician and events organiser Meredith McCrindle and takes place in Ayr's town centre with family-friendly shows and interactive sessions in art, craft, and drama. Typically, the festival centres around Halloween, perhaps a natural parallel given the atmosphere created by the poem and the fate of its protagonist. Past events have included recitals by the actress Karen Dunbar, an original Burns theatre production at the Gaiety Theatre in Ayr starring Iain Robertson, and a parade.

== See also ==
- Cutty Sark
- "Erlkönig", poem by Johann Wolfgang von Goethe
- Night on Bald Mountain, composition by Modest Mussorgsky
- Witches' Sabbath
