= Robert Soutar =

English actor, manager and director (1830–1908)

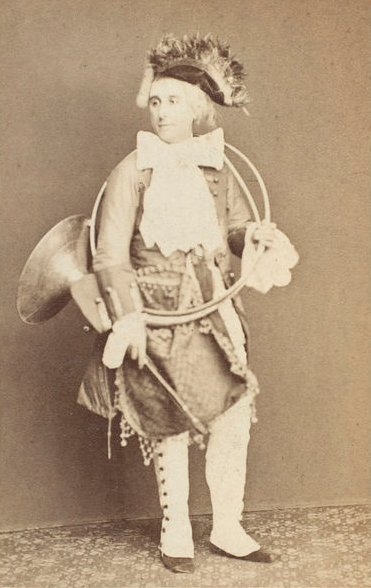
Robert Soutar in 1870

Robert Soutar (1830 – 28 September 1908) was an English actor, comedian, stage manager, writer and director for the theatre. He began his career as a journalist but soon moved into acting. In 1867, he married actress Nellie Farren, and the next year, the two joined the company at the Gaiety Theatre in London. There, he stage managed and wrote for the theatre in addition to acting. His wife became well known for her roles as the "principal boy" in musical burlesques at the theatre. Soutar also directed plays and wrote pantomimes and other pieces. His son was the actor and singer Joseph Farren Soutar.

== Early life and career ==
Born in London the son of Susan and Robert Soutar (1796–1866), Soutar trained as a journalist, in which capacity he worked for a period on the Morning Advertiser, of which his father was for many years an editor. He began his connection with the theatre in 1852 as an amateur actor.

After a period at the Brighton Theatre he played Captain Pertinax in Taming a Truant at London's Olympic Theatre in 1863. He married the actress Nellie Farren on 8 December 1867; they met when they were both members of the company at the Olympic Theatre. Their sons were Henry Robert Soutar (1868–1928), an actor and later a general labourer, and the actor Joseph Farren Soutar. At the Adelphi Theatre in 1868, Soutar's one-act farce, The Fast Coach, written with C. J. Claridge, was produced, and at the same theatre he played the role of Green Jones in Tom Taylor's melodrama The Ticket-of-Leave Man.

On 21 December 1868 Farren and Soutar joined the Gaiety Theatre for the re-opening of the theatre under John Hollingshead's management, where Soutar served as stage manager, writer and actor for some 10 years. In 1868 he played Old Bailey (a wax figure from the Chamber of Horrors) in W. S. Gilbert's operatic parody Robert the Devil. In 1870 he played Prince Casimir in The Princess of Trebizonde, also at the Gaiety.

== Directing and later years ==
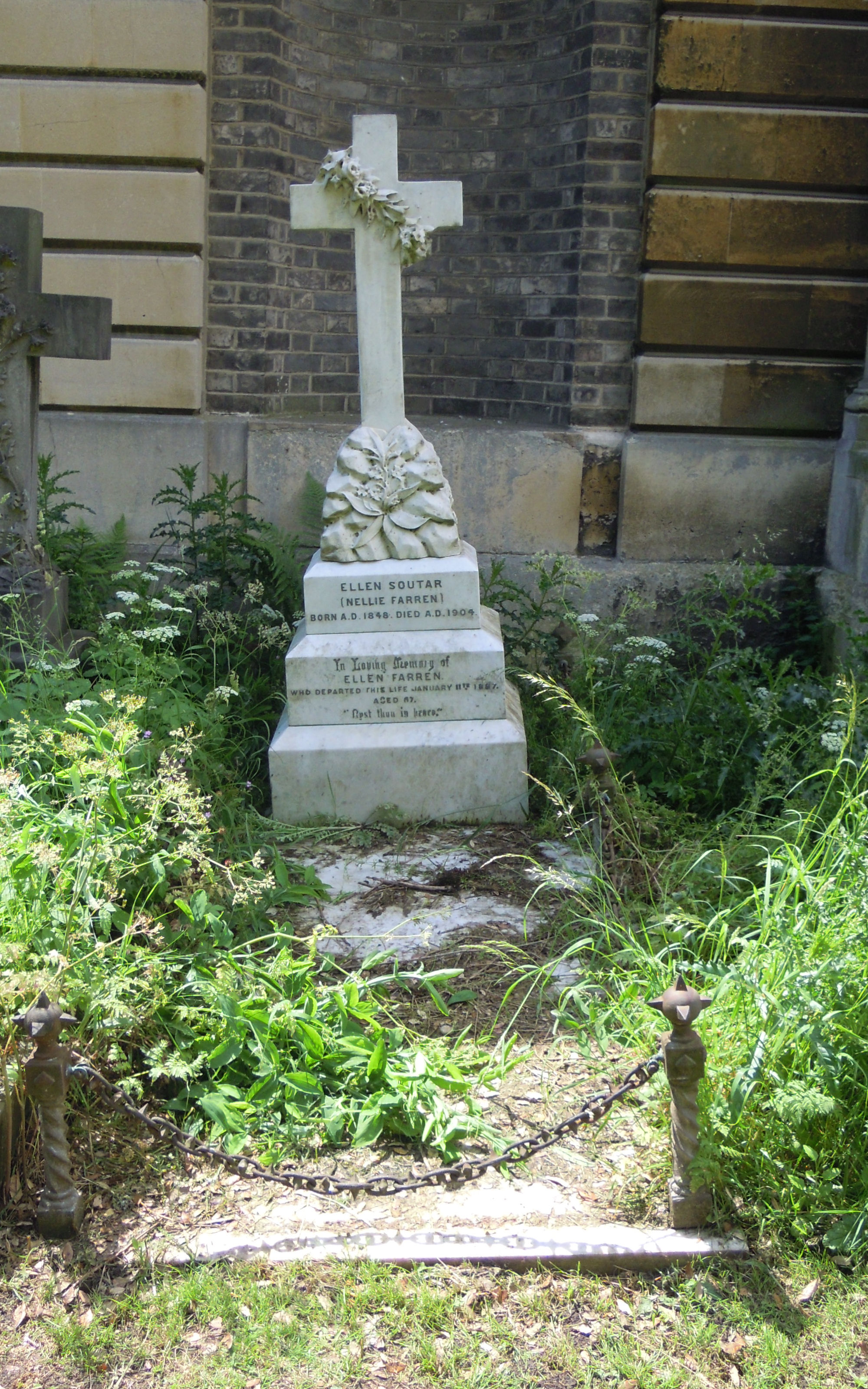
Soutar's grave in Brompton Cemetery

In 1871, Soutar created the role of Tipseion in Thespis, the first Gilbert and Sullivan opera; he also directed the piece. In 1878 he directed a production of The Forty Thieves written by Robert Reece, W. S. Gilbert, F. C. Burnand and Henry J. Byron as an amateur production for the Beefsteak Club of London. His comedy Blindfold was played at the Gaiety Theatre in 1882, and in October of the same year, his farce The Fast Coach was revived. In 1884 he played Lenoir in F. C. Burnand's Just in Time, and in 1885 he again played Green Jones in The Ticket-of-Leave Man (opposite his wife, who played Sam), a role he reprised in his benefit performance in 1891 at the Gaiety Theatre. In 1890 he was the stage manager at Adelphi Theatre. In May 1891 he appeared in the comic drama The Rocket by Arthur Wing Pinero.

In 1892, Soutar edited Joseph A. Cave's reminiscences, A Jubilee of Dramatic Life and Incident. On the 1901 census he was listed as a retired actor.

He died in London in 1908, four years after the death of his wife, and was buried beside her in Brompton Cemetery.
