= Souttar =

Souttar is a surname. Notable people with the surname include:

- Harry Souttar (born 1998), Australian soccer player
- Henry Souttar (1875–1964), British surgeon
- John Souttar (born 1996), Scottish footballer
- James Souttar (1840–1922), Scottish architect
- Robinson Souttar (1848–1912), British politician

== See also ==
- Soutar
