= Souter =

Souter (/ˈsuːtər/, SOO-ter) is a Scottish surname derived from the Scots language term for a shoemaker. Notable people with the surname include:

- A nickname for any native inhabitant of the Royal Burgh of Selkirk, in the Scottish Borders
- Alexander Souter (1873–1949), Scottish biblical scholar
- Brian Souter (born 1954), Scottish businessman
- Charles Henry Souter (1864–1944), Australian poet
- Camille Souter (1929–2023), Irish painter
- David Souter (1939–2025), American jurist
- David Henry Souter (1862–1935), Australian artist and journalist
- Harold Souter (1911–1994), Austrian trade unionist
- John Souter (disambiguation)
- Tom Souter (1912–?), Scottish footballer
- Joe South (born Joseph Souter; 1940–2012), American singer-songwriter

== See also ==
- Souter Lighthouse
- Soutar
- Suter
