= Farren Soutar =

English actor and singer (1870–1962)

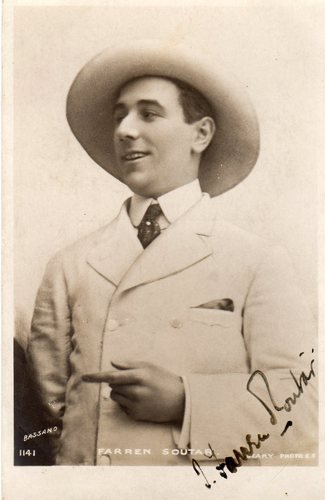
- Soutar, c. 1904
- Born: 17 February 1870; Greenwich, London, U.K.
- Died: 23 January 1962 (aged 91); Cookham, Berkshire, England, U.K.
- Resting place: Brompton Cemetery, London, U.K.
- Occupation(s): Actor, singer
- Years active: 1886–1946
- Parent(s): Robert Soutar; Nellie Farren

Joseph Farren Soutar (17 February 1870 – 23 January 1962), was an English actor and singer who became known for his performances in Edwardian Musical Comedies in the West End and on Broadway. Later he acted in some serious plays. His mother was Nellie Farren, the famous principal boy in Victorian burlesque.

== Early years ==
Born in Greenwich in London, he was the son of the actor, stage manager, and director Robert Soutar and the actress and singer Nellie Farren, known for her roles as the "principal boy" in musical burlesques at the Gaiety Theatre. His older brother was Henry Robert Soutar (1868–1928). A boyhood friend (and with whom he was later to work on the 1934 film The Iron Duke) was George Arliss, for whom Soutar found his first acting job in 1886.

== Acting career ==
A baritone leading man, he played a number of roles in Edwardian Musical Comedies, including Bobbie Rivers in A Gaiety Girl (1894), Algernon St. Alban in An Artist's Model at the Lyric Theatre (1895), the parody A Model Trilby; or, A Day or Two After Du Maurier, based on the popular play Trilby, staged at the Opera Comique and produced by his then-retired mother in 1895, Dick Cunningham in The Geisha at Daly's Theatre (1897), Lieut. Crosby in The Wrong Mr. Wright at the Strand Theatre (1899), Jack Hemingway in The Girl from Up There at the Lyceum Theatre on Broadway (1901), and Michael Brue in Sergeant Brue at the Royal Strand Theatre (1904).

Edna May and Soutar in The Belle of Mayfair (1906)

Further stage appearances included Tom Hatherton in Howard Talbot's hit musical A Chinese Honeymoon at the Royal Strand Theatre (1903), the Duke of St. Jermyns in The Catch of the Season at Daly's Theatre in New York (1905), and Hon. Raymond Finchley in The Belle of Mayfair at the Vaudeville Theatre (1906). In June 1906 he was one of a group notable comedians who took part in a 'Minstrel Entertainment' as part of the jubilee celebrations for Ellen Terry.

Now in his 40s, Soutar played the Hon. James Bendoyle in Peggy at the Casino Theatre in New York (1911), appeared in the London revues Review of Revues (1912), and Everybody's Doing It at the Empire Theatre (1912), acted in Who's the Lady? at the Garrick Theatre (1913), and played Stephen Gale in The Greatest Wish at the Garrick (1912–1913).

In December 1914, during World War I, Soutar was commissioned as a 2nd lieutenant in 8th Battalion, Hampshire Regiment. After the war, he resumed his stage career, acting in Her Husband's Wife at the Globe Theatre (1920–1921), appearing in Bluebeard's Eighth Wife at the Prince's Theatre, Bristol (1923–1924), and two decades later was an extra in Hamlet at the Drury Lane Theatre (1944) and acted in A Midsummer Night's Dream at the Haymarket Theatre (1944–1945).

His final recorded appearance was as Gentleman with gout in Crime and Punishment at the New Theatre (1946). Soutar also made three film appearances, all in 1934: Metternich in The Iron Duke, Lord Louis in The Crucifix, and John Hillcrest in The Black Abbot.

== Personal life ==
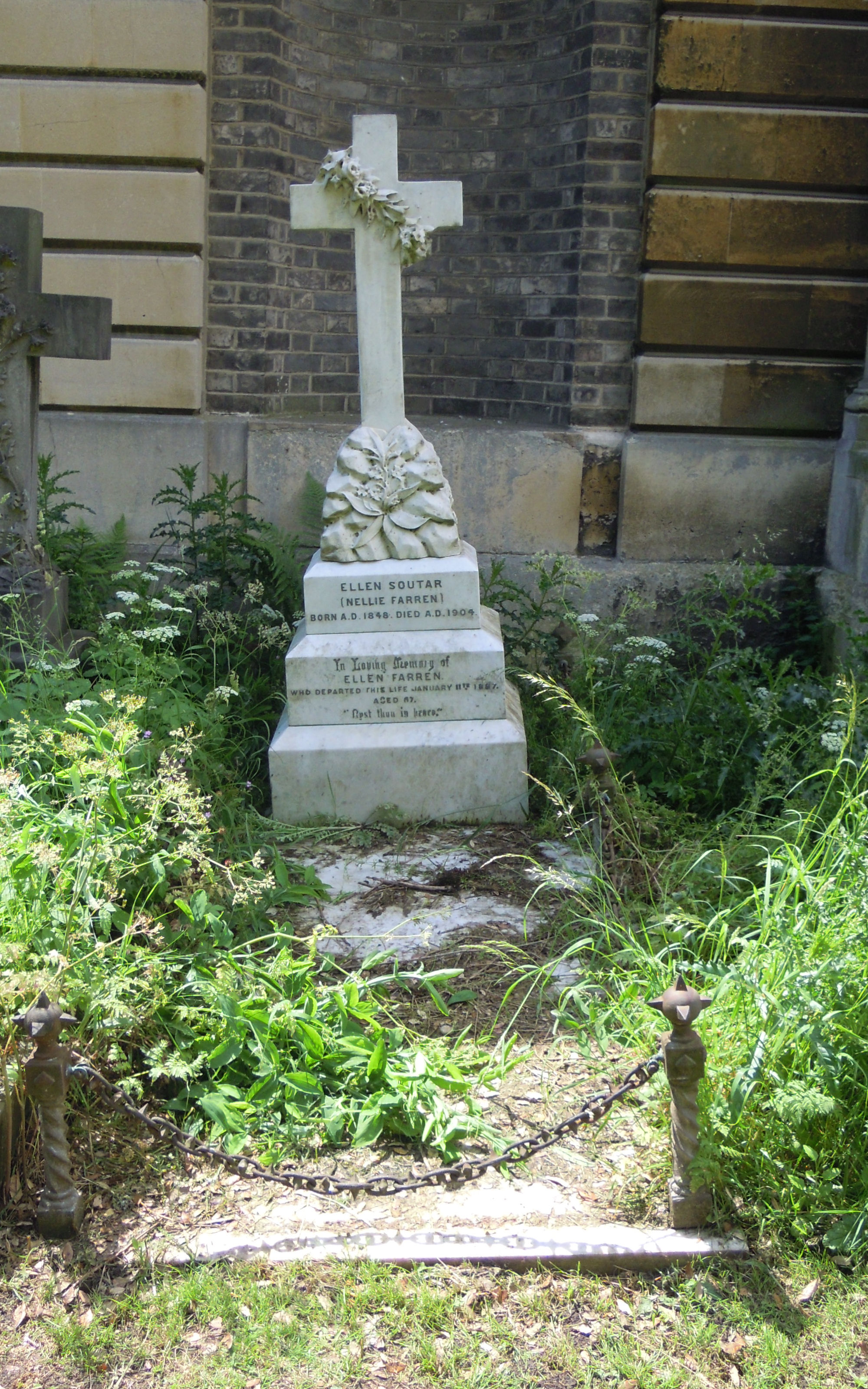
Soutar's grave, Brompton Cemetery

On 27 July 1908 Soutar married Edith May Hobson (1884–1954) at St. Paul's church in Hammersmith in London. In July 1921 Soutar began divorce proceedings against his wife claiming she had committed adultery with the actor Robert Leonard (1888–1948) during the run of the comedy Business Before Pleasure (1918–19) at the Savoy Theatre. The case was dismissed because of lack of any evidence of adultery. Following his wife's death in 1954 he married the actress Dorothy Lane (born 1890) in the same year.

Soutar died, aged 91, on 23 January 1962 at Cookham in Berkshire. He was buried beside his mother in Brompton Cemetery.
