= The Crucifix =

1934 British film by G.B. Samuelson

- Directed by: G.B. Samuelson
- Written by: Roland Pertwee; G.B. Samuelson
- Produced by: Gordon E. Craig
- Starring: Sydney Fairbrother; Nancy Price; Farren Soutar
- Production company: British Instructional Films
- Distributed by: Universal Pictures
- Release date: March 1934
- Running time: 48 minutes
- Country: United Kingdom
- Language: English

The Crucifix is a 1934 British drama film directed by G.B. Samuelson and starring Sydney Fairbrother, Nancy Price and Farren Soutar. It was produced as a quota quickie for release by Universal Pictures.

== Plot ==
An elderly woman hires a young aide to care for her and terrorizes her with her unreasonable demands.

== Cast ==
- Sydney Fairbrother as Lavinia Brooker
- Nancy Price as Miss Bryany
- Farren Soutar as Lord Louis
- Brenda Harvey as Miss Bryany (1886)
- Audrey Cameron as Lavinia (1886)
- Pollie Emery as Landlady

== Bibliography ==
- Chibnall, Steve. Quota Quickies: The Birth of the British 'B' Film. British Film Institute, 2007.
- Low, Rachael. Filmmaking in 1930s Britain. George Allen & Unwin, 1985.
- Wood, Linda. British Films, 1927-1939. British Film Institute, 1986.
