= John Hollingsworth =

British orchestral conductor

John Hollingsworth (20 March 1916 – 29 December 1963) was a British orchestral conductor prominent in the concert hall, the ballet and opera theatre, and the film studio. He was Sir Malcolm Sargent's assistant conductor at The Proms, where he conducted over 60 times including some world and British premieres. He also conducted at the Royal Opera and Sadlers Wells, and became associated with music for British horror films of the 1950s and early 1960s.

== Career ==
John Ernest Hollingsworth was born in Enfield, Middlesex in 1916. He was educated at Bradfield College, Berkshire, and the Guildhall School of Music. When he conducted the London Symphony Orchestra in 1937, at the age of 21, he was the youngest man up to that time ever to conduct that orchestra. He later set similar records with the London Philharmonic Orchestra and National Symphony Orchestra.

Still only 23 when World War II broke out, he volunteered for the Royal Air Force and served as assistant conductor of the Royal Air Force Band and associate conductor of the Royal Air Force Symphony Orchestra. He also worked with the Crown Film Unit, which was producing documentary films to bolster the war effort. He took the RAF Symphony Orchestra to the Potsdam Conference for six concerts; the leaders Winston Churchill, Harry S. Truman and Joseph Stalin were given the opportunity to make their requests, and Hollingsworth was surprised when Stalin chose Borodin's 1st Symphony instead of a contemporary Soviet work.

On discharge in 1945, he joined the Rank Organisation under Muir Mathieson. He was the uncredited associate musical director for Brief Encounter (1945). His earliest screen credits were as conductor on A Piece of Cake (1946), When the Bough Breaks (1947), and They Made Me a Fugitive (1947). He was assistant music director for the William Walton score for Laurence Olivier's Hamlet (1948). He combined this film work with conducting at the Royal Ballet. He left Rank in 1949 to become music director of the Central Office of Information, a documentary unit, and in 1950 also became conductor of the Sadler's Wells Ballet.

In 1949 he became associate conductor to Sir Malcolm Sargent at the Henry Wood Promenade Concerts, and continued his association there for ten years, making 63 appearances. These included such world premieres as Elisabeth Lutyens' Viola Concerto, Op.15 (with Frederick Riddle; 1950); Denis ApIvor's A Mirror for Witches, Op.19a (symphonic suite; 1954); John Greenwood's Viola Concerto (with Watson Forbes; 1956); Stanley Bate's Piano Concerto No. 3, Op. 66 (1957). There were also local premieres of works by Hans Werner Henze, Jacques Ibert, Gordon Jacob, Gian Carlo Menotti, Franz Reizenstein, Humphrey Searle and John Born Veale.

During the 1950s, he conducted at the Royal Opera House, Covent Garden, and directed the Tunbridge Wells Symphony concerts. He also worked in Europe (guest conductor of the Danish State Radio Orchestra) and the United States.

He continued with his film conducting work, and joined the music department at Hammer Films, which was becoming known for its science fiction and horror films, often with scores by James Bernard. There he conducted The Quatermass Experiment (1955), Quatermass 2 (1957), The Curse of Frankenstein (1957), and Horror of Dracula (1958). He also did the occasional documentary work, such as Flight of the White Heron (1954), a feature-length documentary about Queen Elizabeth and the Duke of Edinburgh's visit to the United States; and Ralph Vaughan Williams's The England of Elizabeth (here on YouTube is a brief film of him rehearsing the orchestra in this music, in the presence of the composer).

In 1955, he gave Richard Rodney Bennett the chance to write his first film score, and for the last eight years of his life he was Bennett's mentor for film music.

His later film work included The Devil's Disciple and The Hound of the Baskervilles (1959), and Don't Bother to Knock (1961), Billy Liar, The Damned, Heavens Above! and The Wrong Arm of the Law (1963).

John Hollingsworth made numerous recordings, mainly of ballet and light orchestral music. His recordings include:

- Tchaikovsky's Suite from The Nutcracker, with the Sinfonia of London
- Grieg's Elegiac Melodies and Sigurd Jorsalfar, with the Covent Garden Orchestra
- Charles Mackerras's Gilbert and Sullivan ballet pastiche Pineapple Poll, with the Pro Arte Orchestra
- Malcolm Arnold's Tam O'Shanter Overture

He died suddenly of pneumonia in London in 1963, aged only 47.
