= Robert Burns Memorial (Barre) =

Coordinates: 44°11′47″N 72°29′56.7″W

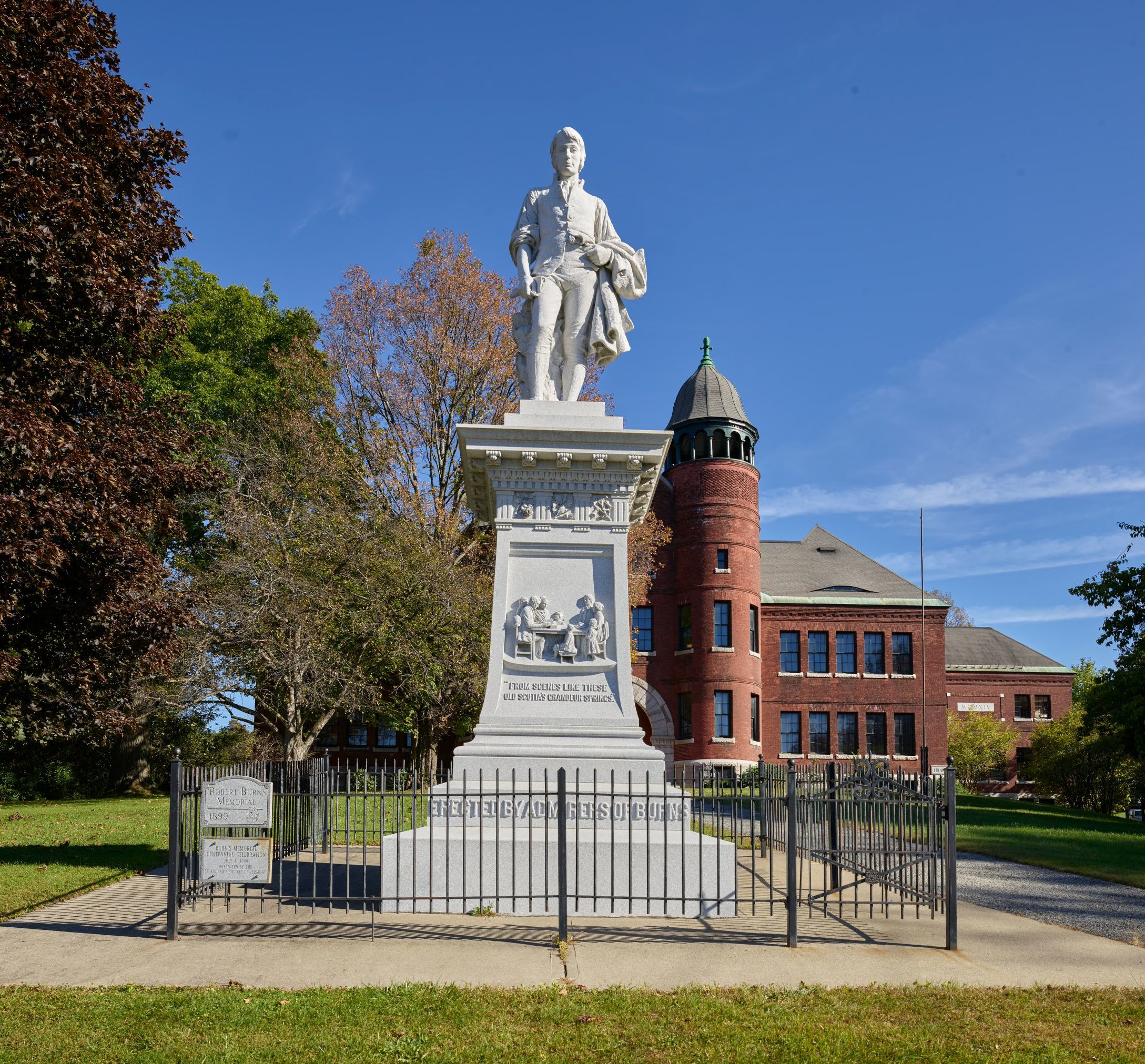
Monument to Scottish poet Robert Burns

The Robert Burns Memorial is a granite monument located in downtown Barre, Vermont. It was erected by Barre's Scottish immigrants in 1899 to commemorate the centenary of the death of Scottish poet Robert Burns.

The statue was conceived and modeled by J. Massey Rhind. James B. King of Milford, New Hampshire modeled the four panels. Sam Novelli carved the statue at the Barclay Brothers' granite firm. Elia Corti, an Italian, carved the panels.

== Pedestal ==
The monument itself stands 22 feet 4 inches (6.81 m) above the foundation, and the statue is 9 feet 4 inches (2.84 m) tall. Carved panels in high relief are principal features of the pedestal. Three each depict a scene from a Burns poem, The Cotter's Saturday Night, To a Mountain Daisy, and Tam o' Shanter's Ride. The fourth panel depicts Burns' cottage in Ayr, Scotland.

== Statue ==
The statue shows the poet returning from his day's work, in ploughman's dress, sleeves rolled up, bareheaded, his coat on his arm, eyes on the ground, and with an attitude and expression of thoughtful meditation.

- Front: The Cotter's Saturday Night – "From scenes like these old Scotia's grandeur springs."
- Right: Tam o' Shanter's Ride – "Ae spring brought off her master hale/ but left behind her ain grey tail."
- Left: To a Mountain Daisy – "Wee, modest, crimson-tipped flow'r;/ Thou's met me in a evil hour."
- Back: "Burns's Cottage"

== History ==
In January 1890, the Robert Burns Club of Barre was founded as a social and literary group in honor of Burns.

On July 21, 1896, the fifty-member club met to commemorate the centenary of Burns' death. At this meeting, the erection of an inspiring monument to Burns was advocated. It was felt that since Barre was thought of as the "Granite Center of the World" the monument should be the finest work of granite the world had yet produced.

By the anniversary of Burns' birth (January 25, 1897), plans were well under way. Funds were raised throughout Vermont, but largely from the people of Barre.

The dedication ceremony was held on July 21, 1899 and attracted one of the largest groups of people yet assembled in Barre. Among the attendees were military and civic organizations, honored guests and Miss Florence Inglis who, dressed and crowned as the Scottish Muse, unveiled the statue.
