= Tam O'Shanter (painting) =

Painting by Eugène Delacroix

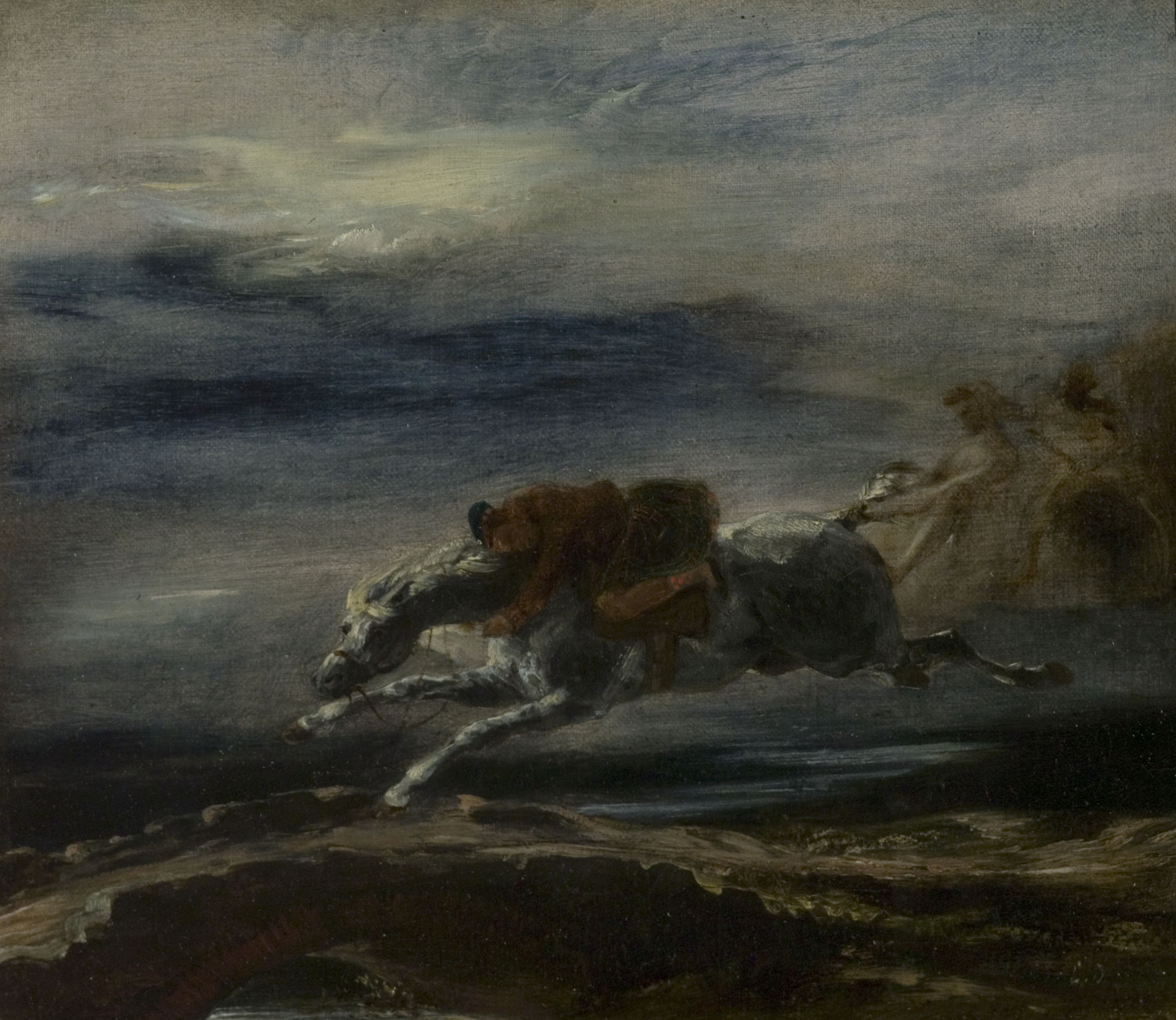
- Artist: Eugène Delacroix
- Year: 1825
- Type: Oil on canvas
- Dimensions: 26.2 cm × 30.8 cm (10.3 in × 12.1 in)
- Location: Nottingham Castle; Nottingham

Tam O'Shanter is an 1825 oil painting by the French artist Eugène Delacroix. It illustrates a scene from the 1790 poem by the Scottish writer Robert Burns Tam o' Shanter. The protagonist is shown riding hard across a bridge to escape witches in pursuit. Stylistically it reflects Delacroix's role in the romantic movement which was at its height during the decade. Today the painting is in the collection of the Nottingham Castle in England, having been acquired from Sotheby's in 1980. Another version is in Zürich in Switzerland

== Bibliography ==
- Allard, Sébastien & Fabre, Côme. Delacroix. Metropolitan Museum of Art, 2018.
- Alston, Isabella. Delacroix. TAJ Books International, 2014.
- Johnson, Lee. DelacroixWeidenfeld and Nicolson, 1963.
- Noon, Patrick & Bann, Stephen. Constable to Delacroix: British Art and the French Romantics. Tate, 2003
- Wilson-Smith, Timothy. Delacroix: A Life. Constable, 1992.
