= Nellie Farren =

English actress and singer (1848–1904)

Nellie Farren

Ellen "Nellie" Farren (16 April 1848 – 28 April 1904) was an English actress and singer known for her roles as the "principal boy" in musical burlesques at the Gaiety Theatre in London. For a quarter of a century there, she was "the best-known star of London burlesque".

Born into a theatrical family, Farren began acting as a child. She made her professional adult debut in 1864 and joined the company at London's Olympic Theatre, performing in Shakespeare, contemporary comedies, dramas and musical burlesques. From 1868 to 1892, she performed at the Gaiety Theatre, which specialised in musical burlesque, becoming famous in the male and principal boy roles, which permitted an actress in the Victorian era theatre to show her legs in tights. Farren gained a large following among the theatre's mostly male audience.

Farren created the role of Mercury in Gilbert and Sullivan's first collaboration, Thespis and created or played roles in works by Dion Boucicault, Anthony Trollope, Charles Dickens, William Congreve and Henry James Byron, among many others. In the 1880s, she created roles in the series of famous Gaiety burlesques with musical scores by Meyer Lutz, often written by Fred Leslie. Some of her most famous of these later roles were the title characters in Little Jack Sheppard and Ruy Blas and the Blasé Roué. She also became a co-producer of the Gaiety Theatre.

After Farren suffered an attack of rheumatic fever in 1891, her health forced to retire from the stage in 1892. A 6-hour gala benefit for her was arranged at the Theatre Royal, Drury Lane in 1898. Attended by nearly the entire theatrical community, the most famous actors of the day performed, raising the astonishing sum of £7,000 (equivalent to £787,000 in 2025) for her retirement.

== Early life and career ==
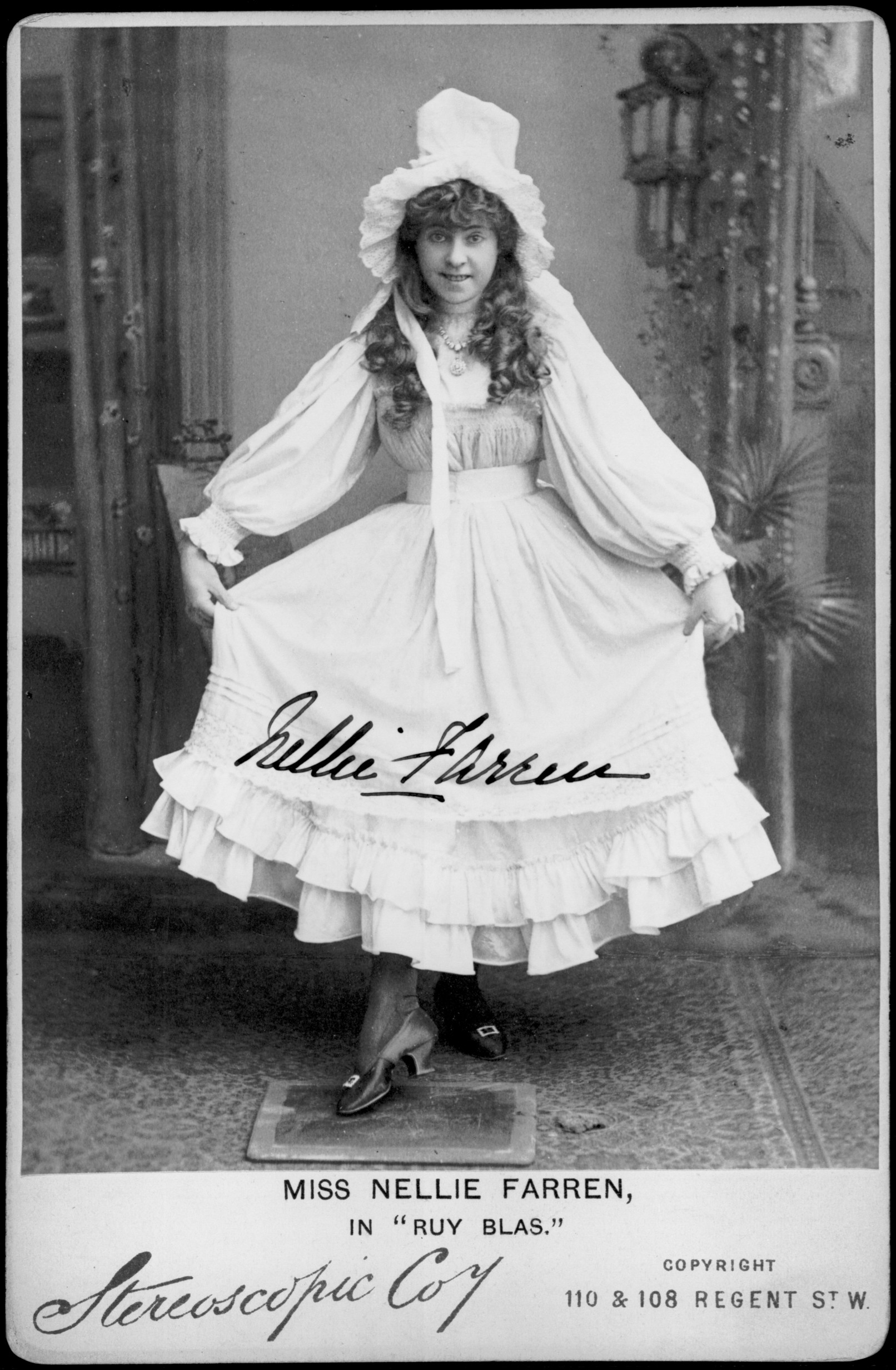
Farren in Ruy Blas (1889)

Farren was born in Lancashire to a theatrical family. Her grandfather, William Farren, was a well-known actor. Her father, Henry Farren, and her uncle, William, were both actors. Her mother was Ellen nee Smithson. Farren married actor and stage manager Robert Soutar in 1867, and the couple had two sons, Henry Robert Soutar (1868–1928), an actor who ended his days as a general labourer, and the actor Joseph Farren Soutar (1870–1962).

Her first role was as the young Duke of York in Richard III in 1853 at the Theatre Royal, Exeter. She first appeared on the London stage at the age of seven, at the Victoria Theatre, playing Genie of the Ring in Dick Whittington. Although she played other juvenile singing and acting roles in London and the British provinces, she completed her education. As a child, she sometimes modelled for Dante Gabriel Rossetti. In 1862, she played the Fairy Star in The Rose of Blarney at Sadler's Wells Theatre, receiving good notices, followed by a series of other parts at the Victoria Theatre. One of her last roles there is considered her adult debut, as Ninetta in The Woman in Red in 1864.

Later in 1864, Farren moved to the Olympic Theatre, where she stayed for several years, playing in a number of pieces, including The Hidden Hand by Tom Taylor; My Wife's Bonnet by John Maddison Morton; the burlesques Prince Camaralzaman, or, the Fairies' Revenge and Faust and Marguerite; and Shakespeare's Twelfth Night, as the Clown. She also played the title role in Lydia Languish, Charlotte in High Life Below Stairs, Nerissa in The Merchant of Venice, the title role in Nan the Good for Nothing by J. B. Buckstone, Jo in Nicholas Nickleby, and Sam Willoughby in The Ticket-of-Leave Man, again earning praise for her comic portrayals. The manager of the Olympic, Horace Wigan, and playwright Tom Taylor, each of whom directed shows at the theatre, taught Farren much about stagecraft and encouraged her to experiment and expand her acting. During this time, she also played roles in other theatres, such as Pert in London Assurance in 1866. In the second half of 1868, she joined the company at the Queen's Theatre, Long Acre, playing, among other things, Nancy Rouse in a F. C. Burnand's burlesque Fowl Play.

== Gaiety Theatre years ==
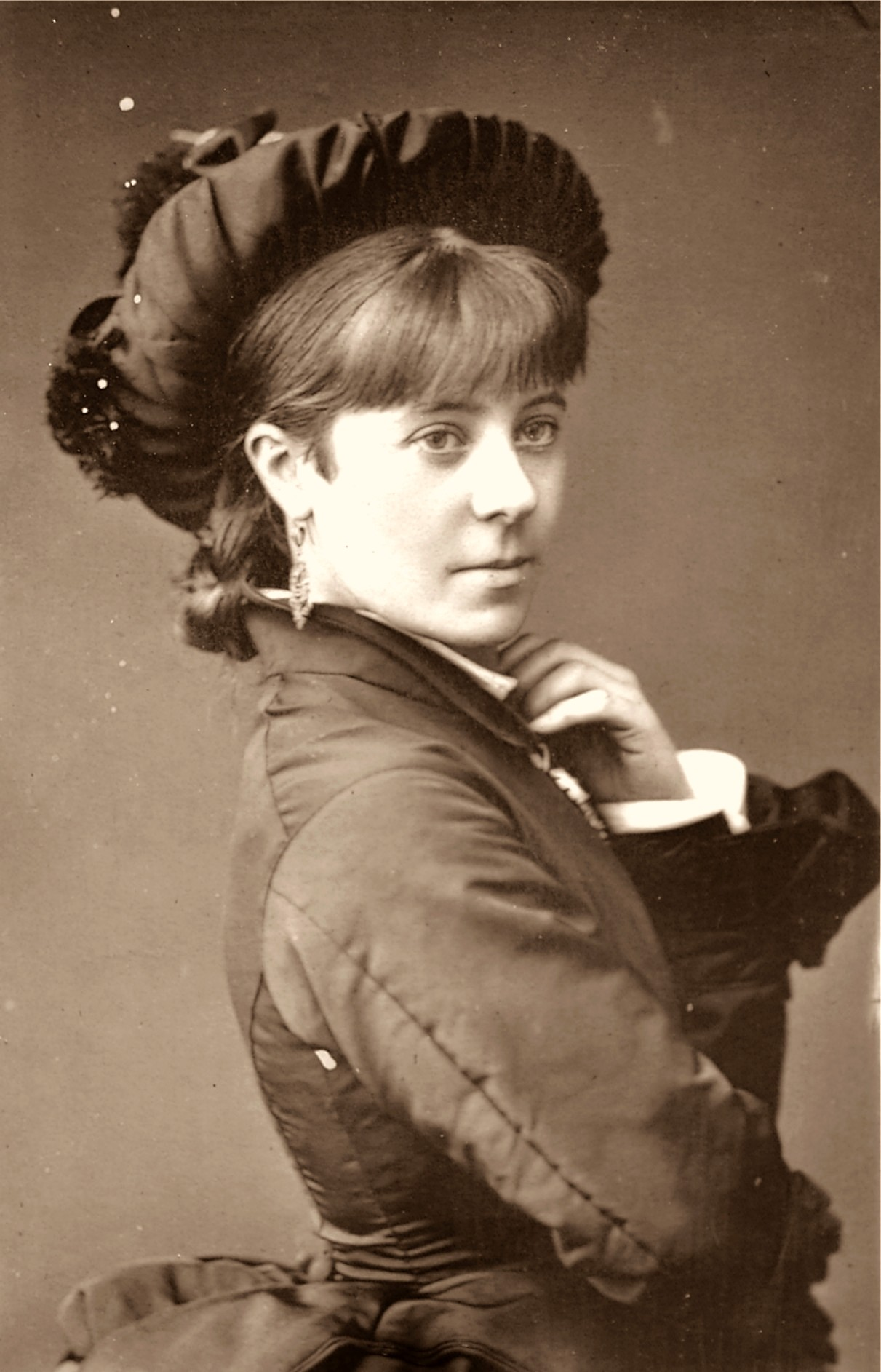
Nellie Farren

Farren began her long tenure at the Gaiety Theatre in December 1868, at the re-opening of the theatre under new management by John Hollingshead, playing Sprightly in On the Cards and the title role in its companion piece, Robert the Devil, by W. S. Gilbert, a burlesque of the opera Robert le Diable. This ran until May 1869. Her husband, Robert Soutar, joined the theatre at the same time and served as an actor, stage manager and writer there. Farren next played the title role in Alfred Thompson's Columbus!, or the Original Pitch in a Merry Key (1869).

Farren continued at the Gaiety for the next 25 years, playing in comedies of all kinds and in Shakespearean dramas, first under Hollingshead and then under George Edwardes, performing the lead in dozens of shows, many also starring Edward Terry, Kate Vaughan, Fred Leslie and E. W. Royce. She was most acclaimed in the "principal boy" roles. These roles permitted the actress to show her legs in tights, and Farren became very popular with the young men of the Gaiety audience, who would wear a coloured scarf to show support for their favourite actress. Farren's colours were dark blue, light blue and white, and she could look out over the audience to compare the number of fans displaying her colours as compared to the colours of the other actresses. According to Hollingshead, Farren developed a "spinal complaint, which troubled her in her early Gaiety career [and] developed into locomotor ataxy" later.

Some of her best known roles in the 1870s included Tilly Slowboy in Dot (Dion Boucicault's version of The Cricket on the Hearth); Miss Prue in Love for Love; Princess of Trebizonde (1870), based on the Jacques Offenbach operetta; Sam Weller in Bardell v. Pickwick; Mercury in Gilbert and Sullivan's first operatic collaboration, Thespis, or, the Gods Grown Old (1871); Ali Baba; Polly Neefit in Shilly-Shally (1872), by Anthony Trollope and Charles Reade; Leporello in Robert Reece's Don Giovanni; Antony and Cleopatra (1873); Clemency Newcome in The Battle of Life, (based on Charles Dickens's Christmas story of that title); the title role in Henry James Byron's Little Don Caesar de Bazan (1876, a send-up of Boucicault's play); Thaddeus in Byron's The Bohemian G-yurl and the Unapproachable Pole (1877); and title roles in Byron's farce Little Doctor Faust (1878) his Handsome Hernani, or The Fatal Penny-Whistle (1879); and Robbing Roy (1879).

Fred Leslie and Nellie Farren in Little Jack Sheppard

Farren's Gaiety pieces in the 1880s included Meyer Lutz and Robert Reece's burlesques of The Forty Thieves (1880), as Ganem; the title roles in Aladdin (1881) and Little Robin Hood (1882); Ariel (1883, by F. C. Burnand, based on The Tempest); Blue Beard (1882); Camaralzaman and Mazeppa (1884); perhaps her most famous role as Little Jack Sheppard (1885); Monte Cristo Jr., as Edmond Dantes (1886); Dr. Frankenstein in Frankenstein, or The Vampire's Victim (1887); Miss Esmeralda, or The Maid and the Monkey (1887); Fra Diavolo, Gulliver, Rip Van Winkle, Sonnambula; the title role in Cinder Ellen up too Late (1891); and dozens of others. Perhaps the most successful of her later roles was the title role in Ruy Blas and the Blasé Roué (1889, by Fred Leslie and H. F. Clarke, a take-off of Victor Hugo's play Ruy Blas), which she and Fred Leslie toured in Australia (with Sidney Jones) and elsewhere in 1891. In 1888–89, she, Leslie, Letty Lind, Sylvia Grey, Marion Hood and the Gaiety company had toured the US and Australia with Monte Cristo Jr. and Miss Esmeralda.

In addition to these burlesques, Farren also appeared in other comedies such as The Man of Quality (an adaptation of Vanbrugh's The Relapse), as Miss Hoyden (1870); William Congreve's Love for Love, as Miss Prue (1871); Bickerstaff's The Hypocrite, as Charlotte (1873); The Rivals (1874) as Lillian Languish (1874) and as Lucy (1877); The Critic, as Tilburina (1874); Ursula in Much Ado About Nothing (1874); Maria in Twelfth Night (1876); The Grasshopper (1877, an adaptation of Henri Meilhac and Ludovic Halévy's La Cigale); and a number of farces. James McNeill Whistler saw The Grasshopper and was charmed by Farren as the 'grasshopper', a girl who escapes from a circus troupe. In January 1878, Whistler made drawings of her in performance. Another success was her Smike in Nicholas Nickleby (1886). On 3 May 1886, the Gaiety Theatre was host to a benefit concert for its music director, composer Meyer Lutz, including a scene from his burlesque Little Jack Sheppard, in which Farren performed. The same year, Farren helped George Edwards obtain the lease to the Gaiety and became co-producer of the Gaiety company's shows. She toured in the US and Australia with Fred Leslie in 1888–89.

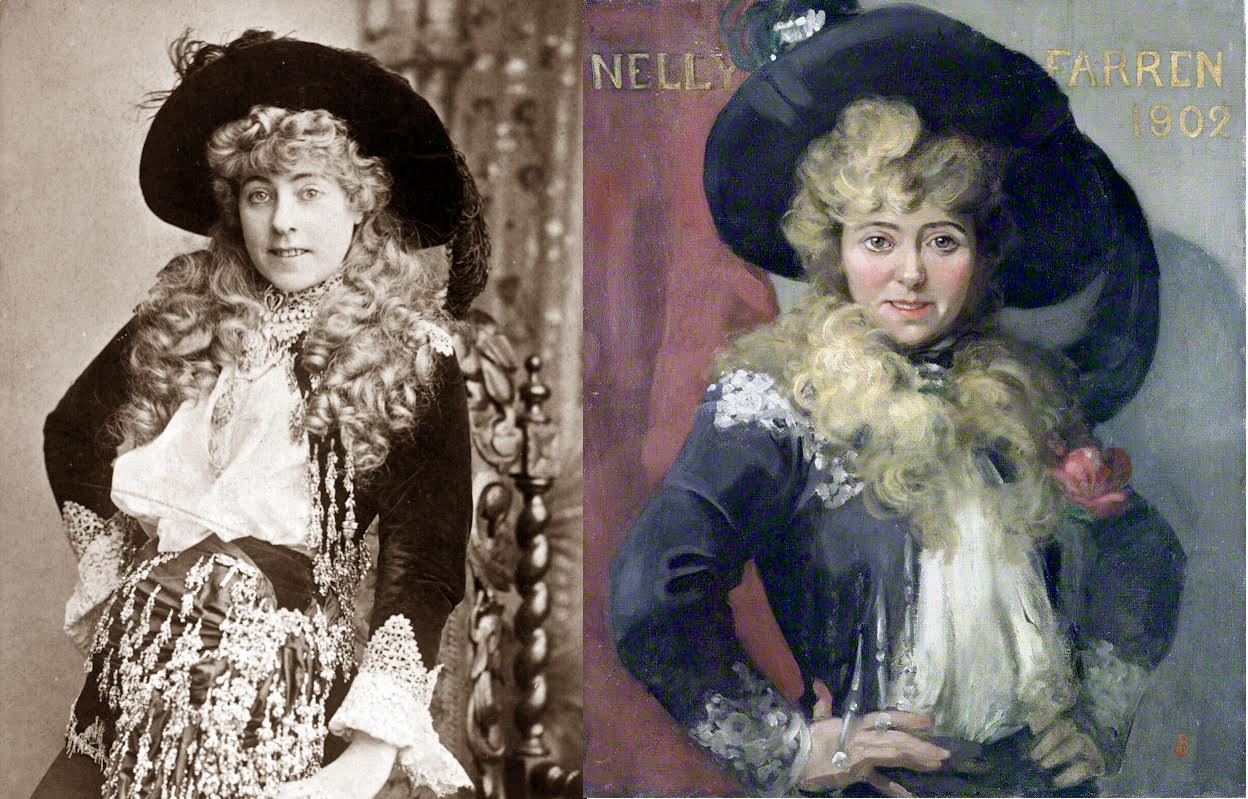
Farren in Ruy Blas: photo (c. 1889) and painting (1902)

The New York Times described her appeal as "her inexhaustible vivacity, her espieglerie".

== Last years ==
Her last regular role at the Gaiety was Nan in Good for Nothing in a benefit for Lutz in April 1891. Later in 1891, Farren suffered an attack of rheumatic fever while in Australia, performing in Cinder Ellen up too late, which aggravated her spinal disease. She had to withdraw from the London production of Cinder Ellen up too late. The spinal disease progressively crippled her, and by 1892, Farren had become too crippled to work steadily and was mostly retired from the stage. In 1895, Farren had a partial recovery and managed her own company at the Opera Comique but had little success. One piece by this company that was well reviewed was A Model Trilby; or, A Day or Two After Du Maurier, by Charles H. E. Brookfield and William Yardley, with music by Meyer Lutz. The piece was a burlesque of the Haymarket Theatre's hit Trilby, an adaptation of the 1894 George du Maurier novel of the same name. However, Farren lost her savings on the venture.

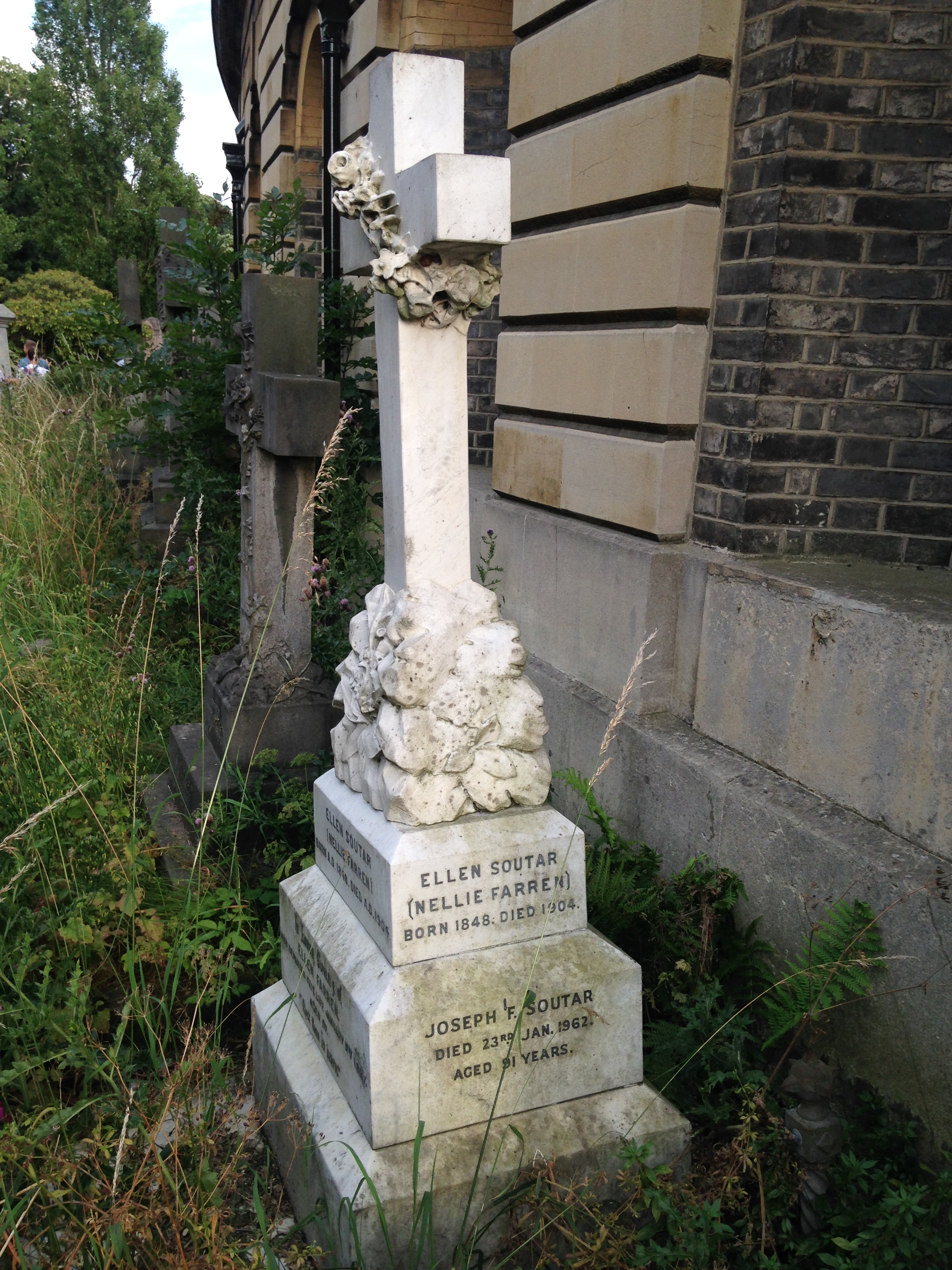
Farren and her son Joseph's gravestone in Brompton Cemetery

George Edwardes organised a gala benefit for Farren at the Theatre Royal, Drury Lane, on 17 March 1898. The star-studded event, attended by a standing-room only crowd of 3,000 people (including her long-time fan, the Prince of Wales), lasted six hours. It included a performance of Trial by Jury with W. S. Gilbert as the Associate and Effie Bancroft as the "Associate's Wife"; the barristers were all playwrights, the jury included many well-known comic actors, the bridesmaids included leading ladies of the day mixed with chorus girls from the Gaiety, and a huge "crowd in court" was made up of D'Oyly Carte Opera Company principals and other actors. Principals included Barrington, Pounds, Lewis, Passmore, Lytton and Perry. Also given was the premiere of a J. M. Barrie playlet, "A Platonic Friendship". Kate Vaughan returned, after a 12 year absence, to dance. Henry Irving recited The Dream of Eugene Aram, Ellen Terry played Ophelia, Albert Chevalier sang Mrs. Hawkins, Dan Leno gave Hamlet, Marie Tempest sang "The Jewel of Asia", and Hayden Coffin sang "Tommy Atkins." In a pantomime, Ellaline Terriss was the Fairy Queen, with Letty Lind as Columbine, Arthur Roberts as a policeman, and Edmund Payne as Clown. Marie Lloyd and several music hall stars danced, Coffin appeared again, and Farren appeared on stage with Charles Wyndham. Lydia Thompson, Kate Santley, Herbert Beerbohm Tree, John Hare, Clara Butt, and many other famous actors performed, as did the choruses of The Geisha, The Circus Girl and other popular shows. Barely able to walk with the aid of crutches though only aged 49, Farren said a few words and made a joke. The benefit raised an estimated £7,000 (equivalent to £787,000 in 2025) for her retirement.

Farren's retirement, coupled with Fred Leslie's death, brought to an end the type of Gaiety burlesque associated with them, at the same time that Edwardian musical comedy was taking over London theatre. Farren made a few appearances in her last years at benefits. Her last public appearance was at a "Nellie Farren Night" at the Gaiety Theatre on 8 April 1903. A performance of The Toreador was followed by The Linkman, a revue of old Gaiety hits in which she performed, written by, and featuring, George Grossmith Jr. At the end of the evening, Farren gave a speech from the stage.

== Death and legacy ==
Farren died in London on 28 April 1904 "from gouty affection of the heart", aged 56, of cardiac failure and was buried in Brompton Cemetery. In 1908 a racehorse was named after her.

Her son Joseph Farren Soutar was buried alongside her when he died in 1962.

== Bibliography ==
- Hilton, George W. Nellie Farren (1997) Sir Arthur Sullivan Society
- Hollingshead, John. Good Old Gaiety: An Historiette & Remembrance (1903) London: Gaity Theatre Co.
