= Beefsteak Club =

Several 18th- and 19th-century male dining clubs in Britain and Australia

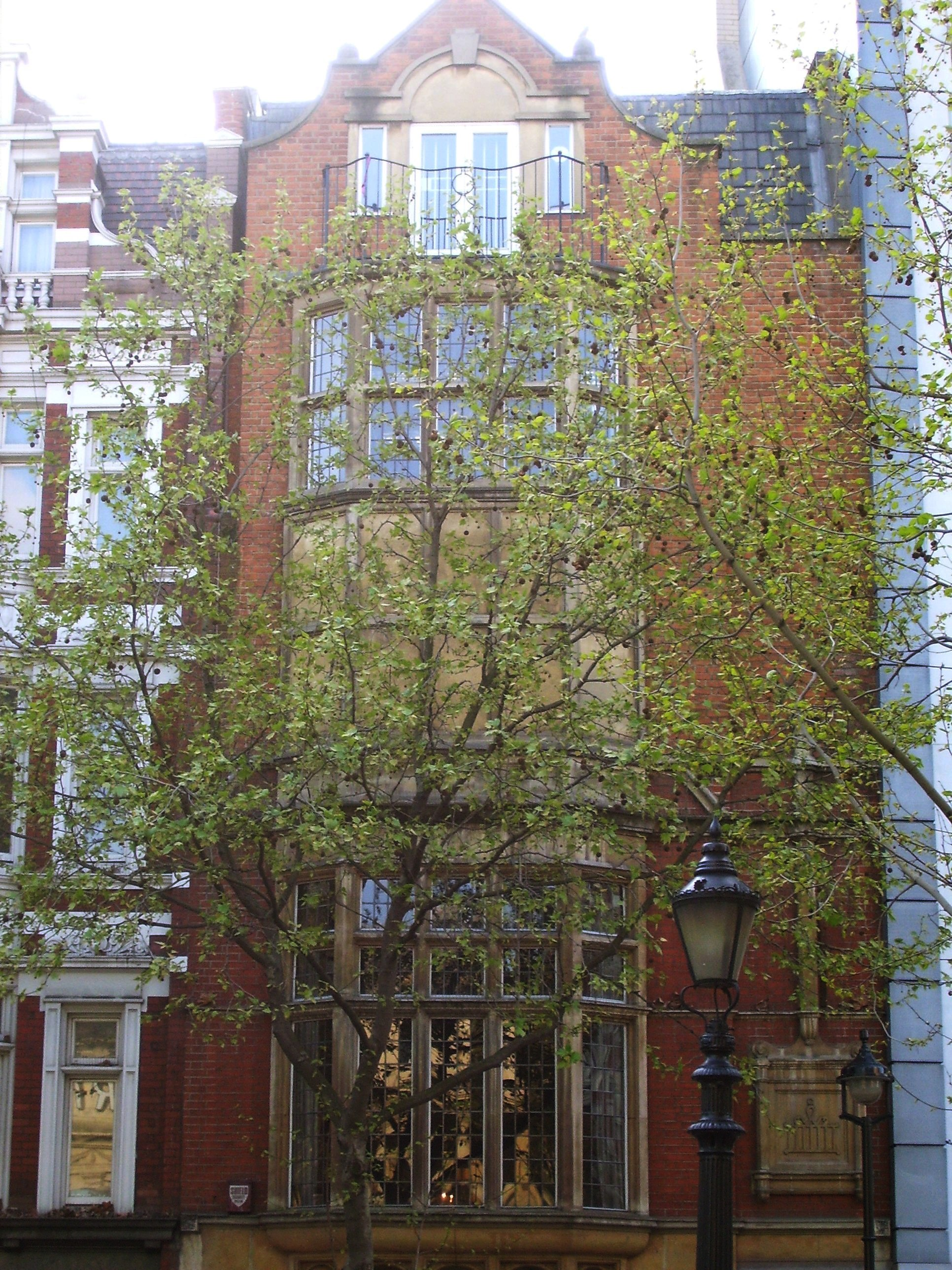
The present-day Beefsteak Club, Irving Street, London

Beefsteak Club is the name or nickname of several 18th- and 19th-century male dining clubs in Britain and Australia that celebrated the beefsteak as a symbol of patriotic and often Whig concepts of liberty and prosperity.

The first beefsteak club was founded about 1705 in London by the actor Richard Estcourt and others in the arts and politics. This club flourished for less than a decade. The Sublime Society of Beef Steaks was established in 1735 by another performer, John Rich, at the Theatre Royal, Covent Garden, where he was then manager, and George Lambert, his scenic artist, with two dozen members of the theatre and arts community (Samuel Johnson joined in 1780). The society became much celebrated, and new members included royalty, statesmen and great soldiers: in 1785, the Prince of Wales joined.

At the weekly meetings, the members wore a blue coat and buff waistcoat with brass buttons bearing a gridiron motif and the words "Beef and liberty". The steaks and baked potatoes were accompanied by port or porter. After dinner, the evening was given up to noisy revelry. The club met almost continuously until 1867. Sir Henry Irving revived its tradition in the late nineteenth century. The Sublime Society was revived in 1966 and holds many of the original Society's relics in safe keeping. Its membership includes lineal descendants from the nineteenth century membership, and it adheres to the Society's early rules and customs.

Other "Beefsteak Clubs" included one in Dublin from 1749, for performers and politicians, and several in London and elsewhere. Many used the gridiron as their symbol, and some are even named after it, including the Gridiron Club of Washington, D.C., US. In 1876, a Beefsteak Club was formed that became an essential after-theatre club for the bohemian theatre set, including W. S. Gilbert, and still meets in Irving Street.

== History ==
=== Early beefsteak clubs ===
The first known beefsteak club (the Beef-Stake Club, Beef-Steak Clubb or Honourable Beef-Steak Club) seems to have been that founded in about 1705 in London. It was started by some seceders from the Whiggish Kit-Cat Club, "desirous of proving substantial beef was as prolific a food for an English wit as pies and custards for a Kit-cat beau." The actor Richard Estcourt was its "providore" or president and its most popular member. William Chetwood in A General History of the Stage is the much quoted source that the "chief Wits and great men of the nation" were members of this club. This was the first beefsteak club known to have used a gridiron as its badge. In 1708, Dr. William King dedicated his poem "Art of Cookery" to "the Honourable Beef Steak Club". His poem includes the couplet:

He that of Honour, Wit and Mirth partakes,
May be a fit Companion o'er Beef-steaks.

The club originally met at the Imperial Phiz public house in Old Jewry in the City of London, but finding that venue not private enough, it ceased to meet there, and by 1709 it was not known "whether they have healed the breach and returned into the Kit-Cat community [or] … remove from place to place to prevent discovery." Joseph Addison referred to the club in The Spectator in 1711 as still functioning. The historian Colin J. Horne suggests that the club may have come to an end with the death of Estcourt in 1712. There was also a "Rump-Steak or Liberty Club" (also called "The Patriots Club") of London, which was in existence in 1733–34, whose members were "eager in opposition to Sir Robert Walpole".

=== Sublime Society of Beef Steaks ===
Badge of the Sublime Society: a gridiron and the motto "Beef and Liberty"

The Sublime Society of Beef Steaks was established in 1735 by John Rich at the Theatre Royal, Covent Garden, of which he was then manager. One version of its origin has it that the Earl of Peterborough, supping one night with Rich in his private room, was so delighted with the steak Rich grilled him that he suggested a repetition of the meal the next week. Another version is that George Lambert, the scene-painter at the theatre, was often too busy to leave the theatre and "contented himself with a beefsteak broiled upon the fire in the painting-room." His visitors so enjoyed sharing this dish that they set up the Sublime Society. William and Robert Chambers, writing in 1869, favour the second version, noting that Peterborough was not one of the original members. A third version, favoured by the historian of the society, Walter Arnold, is that the society was formed out of the regular dinners shared at the theatre by Rich and Lambert, consisting of hot steak dressed by Rich, accompanied by "a bottle of old port from the tavern hard by." Whatever the details of its genesis, Rich and Lambert are listed as the first two of the society's twenty-four founding members. Women were not admitted. From the outset, the society strove to avoid the term "club", but the shorter "Beefsteak Club" was soon used by many as an informal alternative.

The early core of the society was made up of actors, artists, writers and musicians, among them William Hogarth (a founder-member), David Garrick (possibly), (Note: Garrick is not included in Arnold's supposedly complete list of members, but is included in the Society's anthem printed by Arnold (p. 144). The historian Ian McIntyre states unequivocally that Garrick was not a member.) John Wilkes (elected 1754), Samuel Johnson (1780), and John Philip Kemble (1805). The society soon became much celebrated and these men of the arts were joined by noblemen, royalty, statesmen and great soldiers: in 1785, the Prince of Wales joined, and later his brothers the Dukes of Clarence and Sussex became members.

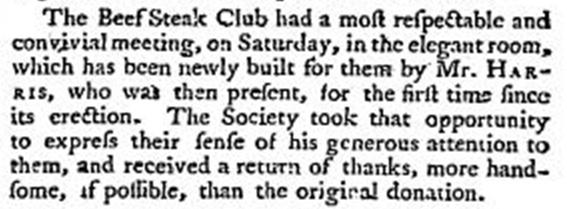
1793 press report – "Club" and "Society" are used interchangeably

Meetings were held every Saturday between November and June. All members were required to wear the society's uniform – a blue coat and buff waistcoat with brass buttons. The buttons bore a gridiron motif and the words "Beef and liberty". The steaks were served on hot pewter plates, with onions and baked potatoes, and were accompanied by port or porter. The only second course offered was toasted cheese. After dinner, the tablecloth was removed, the cook collected the money, and the rest of the evening was given up to noisy revelry.

The society met at Covent Garden until the fire of 1808, when it moved first to the Bedford Coffee House, and thence the following year to the Old Lyceum Theatre. On the burning of the Lyceum in 1830, "The Steaks" met again in the Bedford Coffee House until 1838, when the Lyceum reopened, and a large room there was allotted to the club. These meetings were held till the society ceased to exist in 1867. Its decline in its last twenty or so years was due to changing fashion: many of its members were no longer free on Saturdays, being either engaged in events in London's social season or else away from London at weekends, something much encouraged by the opening of railways. The customary time for dinner had also changed. The society moved its dinner time from 4.00 p.m. in 1808, to 6.00 p.m. in 1833 and to 7.00 p.m. in 1861, and finally to 8.00 p.m. in 1866, but the change inconvenienced the members who preferred the old timing and did not attract new members. Moreover, in Victorian England, its Georgian heartiness and ritual, and old-fashioned uniform, no longer appealed. By 1867 the society had only eighteen members, and the average attendance at dinners had dwindled to two. The club was wound up in 1867, and its assets were auctioned at Christie's, raising a little over £600.

=== Other 18th and 19th century clubs ===
Thomas Sheridan founded a "Beefsteak Club" in Dublin at the Theatre Royal in 1749, and of this Peg Woffington was president. According to William and Robert Chambers, writing in 1869, "it could hardly be called a club at all, seeing all expenses were defrayed by Manager Sheridan, who likewise invited the guests – generally peers and members of parliament. … Such weekly meetings were common to all theatres, it being a custom for the principal performers to dine together every Saturday and invite 'authors and other geniuses' to partake of their hospitality."

The Liberty Beef Steak Club sought to show solidarity with the radical John Wilkes MP and met at Appleby's Tavern in Parliament Street, London for an unknown duration after Wilkes's return from exile in France in 1768. John Timbs wrote in 1872 of a "Beef-Steak Club" which met at the Bell Tavern, Church Row, Houndsditch, and was instituted by "Mr Beard, Mr Dunstall, Mr Woodward, Stoppalear, Bencroft, Gifford etc". It is not clear if the Ivy Lane Club, of which Dr Johnson was a member, was a "Beef-Steak Club", but it met at a famous beef-steak house. (Note: "Johnson had, in the winter of 1749, formed a club that met weekly at the King's Head, a famous beef-steak house in Ivy Lane, near St. Paul's, every Tuesday evening. Thither he constantly resorted with a disposition to please and be pleased. Our conversations seldom began till after a supper so very solid and substantial as led us to think that with him it was a dinner.")

Many beefsteak clubs of the 18th and 19th centuries have used the traditional grilling gridiron as their symbol and some are even named after it: the Gridiron Club of Oxford was founded in 1884, and the Gridiron Club of Washington D.C. was founded the following year. These two clubs also still exist.

The oldest dining club in Australia is the Melbourne Beefsteak Club, established in May 1886, when merchant John Deegan, City Councillor William Ievers, solicitor James Maloney and manufacturer Frank Stuart gathered with friends for regular lunches. Their motto was "Beefsteak and Brotherhood", and the membership was made up of gentlemen from business, the professions, and academia. It held its 300th dinner on 14 October 1916 and its 400th on 11 August 1928, in the Hotel Windsor. "Leadership in War", the speech that General Sir John Monash gave to the Club on 30 March 1926, was included in a 2004 collection entitled The Speeches that Made Australia.

=== Successors to the Sublime Society ===
Dining room at the Lyceum, used by the Sublime Society, restored by Henry Irving. The kitchen is at the rear, beyond the gridiron-shaped grating.

==== Irving's dinners and the present Sublime Society ====
Since the closure of the original Sublime Society in 1867, three separate efforts have been made to revive it in various forms. In 1878 Henry Irving, as the new proprietor of the Lyceum Theatre, restored and furnished the backstage area of the theatre that had been used by the society as its dining room and kitchen. From 1879 until his death in 1905, he hosted dinners for the society. A biographer of Irving wrote, "He wanted the Lyceum to have the same educational and intellectual force that Phelps' theatre had enjoyed in lslington." A contemporary newspaper reported, "Mr. Irving ... restored this venerable sanctuary to something like its former appearance, and very often now it is the scene of the informal and bright little supper parties which he delights to bring about him. … If the nocturnal gatherings in the room were not of a private character we might say a good deal about them, especially as the guests frequently include men whose names are great."

The Sublime Society of Beef Steaks was re-formed in 1966 and has met continually since then. Several nineteenth century members have lineal descendants among today's membership, who wear the original blue and buff uniform (of a Regency character) and buttons and adhere to the 1735 constitution whenever practicable. This revival started to meet at the Irish Club, Eaton Square, in 1966, then at the Beefsteak Club, Irving Street, and today meets in a private room at the Boisdale Club and Restaurant in Belgravia/Victoria and, annually, at White's Club in St James's, where it is able to dine at the early society's nineteenth century table and where it also keeps the early society's original "President's Chair", which Queen Elizabeth II gave to the current society in 1969. Although other of the society's relics (such as the original Grid Iron, Sword of State, Halberts and early members' chairs, rings, glasses, documents, etc.) have passed down to members of the current society from ancestors in the original society, the current society "leaves such items in safety, keeping less fragile replicas and proxy items for its normal meetings in Central London". Other early customs of the original society, such as the singing and composition of songs, are also encouraged by the current society.

==== Beefsteak Club, Irving Street ====
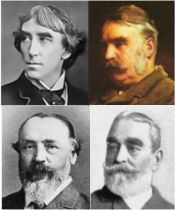
Early members of the 1876 Beefsteak Club: (top) Henry Irving (l) and W. S. Gilbert; (below) Henry Labouchère (l) and F. C. Burnand

The Beefsteak Club that today has premises at 9 Irving Street, London, was established in 1876. When it was founded as a successor to the Sublime Society, its members hoped to rent the society's dining room at the Lyceum. As that room was not available, the club held its first meeting, on 11 March 1876, in rooms above the Folly Theatre (later known as Toole's Theatre) in William IV Street. Two features of the club were, and are, that all members and guests sit together at a single long table, and that by tradition the club steward and the waiters are all addressed as "Charles".

The Beefsteak became an essential after-theatre club for such men as the dramatists F. C. Burnand and W. S. Gilbert, (Note: Gilbert, who could not bring himself to sit through the opening nights of his own plays, often waited at the club until it was time to go to the theatre for the curtain calls.) performers Corney Grain, J. L. Toole, John Hare, Henry Irving and W. H. Kendal, and theatre managers and writers Henry Labouchère and Bram Stoker, (Note: At a dinner at the club in 1890, Stoker was introduced to a Hungarian professor, Arminius Vambéry, who told him of the Dracula legend.) and their peers. Restaurant critic Nathaniel Newnham-Davis was also a member around the turn of the 20th century. The club moved to Green Street, in Mayfair, and, in 1896, to its present address. There were 250 members, some of whom occasionally performed amateur plays for their own amusement and to raise funds for charities. For example, in 1878, they performed The Forty Thieves, written by members Robert Reece, Gilbert, Burnand, and Henry J. Byron. In 1879 there was a much-reported court case following a fracas on the doorstep of the club between Labouchère and Edward Levy-Lawson, proprietor of The Daily Telegraph. The committee of the club expelled Labouchère, who successfully sought a court ruling that they had no right to do so.

The members have included at least one prime minister: in 1957 the members gave a dinner to Harold Macmillan "to mark the occasion of his becoming Prime Minister, and in recognition of his services to the club as their senior trustee." Who's Who lists 791 men, living and dead, who have been members of the present Beefsteak Club. As well as men of the theatre, they include politicians such as R. A. Butler, Roy Jenkins and Robert Gascoyne-Cecil, the writer Evelyn Waugh, poets including John Betjeman, musicians including Edward Elgar and Malcolm Sargent, filmmakers and broadcasters such as Richard Attenborough, Peter Bazalgette, Richard Dimbleby, Barry Humphries and Stephen Fry, and philosophers including A. J. Ayer and A. C. Grayling, as well as figures from other spheres such as Robert Baden-Powell, Osbert Lancaster and Edwin Lutyens.

== See also ==
- List of London's gentlemen's clubs
