= Tam O'Shanter Overture =

Orchestral overture by Malcolm Arnold

The Tam o' Shanter Overture, Op. 51 by Malcolm Arnold is a piece of programme music based on the famous poem by Robert Burns. It was completed in March 1955.

The overture was first performed at the BBC Proms on 17 August 1955, with the composer conducting the Royal Philharmonic Orchestra. Two months later he supervised the first recording of the work by the Philharmonia Orchestra under his assistant conductor, John Hollingsworth.

Despite his many accomplishments in the musical realm, Malcolm Arnold was known for being a drunkard and rather promiscuous, which perhaps was the greatest inspiration for the Tam O’Shanter Overture. The piece is based on an epic poem by Robert Burns which tells of a farmer and drunkard by the name of Tam O’Shanter, a Scotsman, who gets intoxicated with friends in a local tavern while his angry wife waits for him at home. Within the piece, his drunkenness is portrayed by the bassoon theme at the very beginning. On his way back, he stumbles into the Kirk-Alloway (a church) filled with witches and warlocks dancing about. Terrified, Tam scurries away on his horse while being chased by the ghouls. A Scottish theme and Tam's drunkenness reoccur throughout the piece. Two piccolos play a short folk tune randomly throughout. The piece is sprinkled with chromatic runs and scales to portray Tam's hurried scampering as he runs into all sorts of trouble crossing the Brig O'Doon with his beloved horse, a grey mare, named Meg (or Maggie).

It is dedicated to John Michael Diack, director of Arnold's then publishing company Paterson Sons & Co.

== Selected commercial recordings ==
- 1955 Royal Philharmonic Orchestra, conductor John Hollingsworth, Philips NBL5021 - US release: Epic LC 3422, 1958
- 1956 Philharmonia Orchestra, conductor Malcolm Arnold, Columbia SED 5529
- 1957 New Symphony Orchestra of London, conductor Alexander Gibson, RCA Victor LSC-2225
- 1962 Royal Scottish National Orchestra, conductor Alexander Gibson, Waverley YLP 060, SYLP 061 (then Scottish National Orchestra)
- 1981 Royal Scottish National Orchestra, conductor Alexander Gibson, Chandos CHAN 8379
- 1993 Royal Philharmonic Orchestra, conductor Vernon Handley
- 1998 Minnesota Orchestra, conductor Eiji Oue, Reference Recordings RR-82CD
- 2005 BBC Philharmonic, conductor Rumon Gamba, Chandos CHAN 1029
