= Tom Souter =

Scottish footballer

Personal information
- Full name: Thomas Hoggan Souter
- Date of birth: 26 March 1912
- Place of birth: Blair Atholl, Scotland
- Position: Outside forward

Senior career*
Years	Team	Apps	(Gls)
1934–1936	Queen's Park	36	(4)
1936–1938	Rangers	10	(0)

International career
1935	Scotland Amateurs	1	(0)
- * Club domestic league appearances and goals

Thomas Hoggan Souter (born 26 March 1912) was a Scottish amateur footballer who played in the Scottish League for Queen's Park and Rangers as an outside forward. He was capped by Scotland at amateur level.
