= Gaiety Theatre, London =

Former West End theatre in Westminster, England

Gaiety Theatre
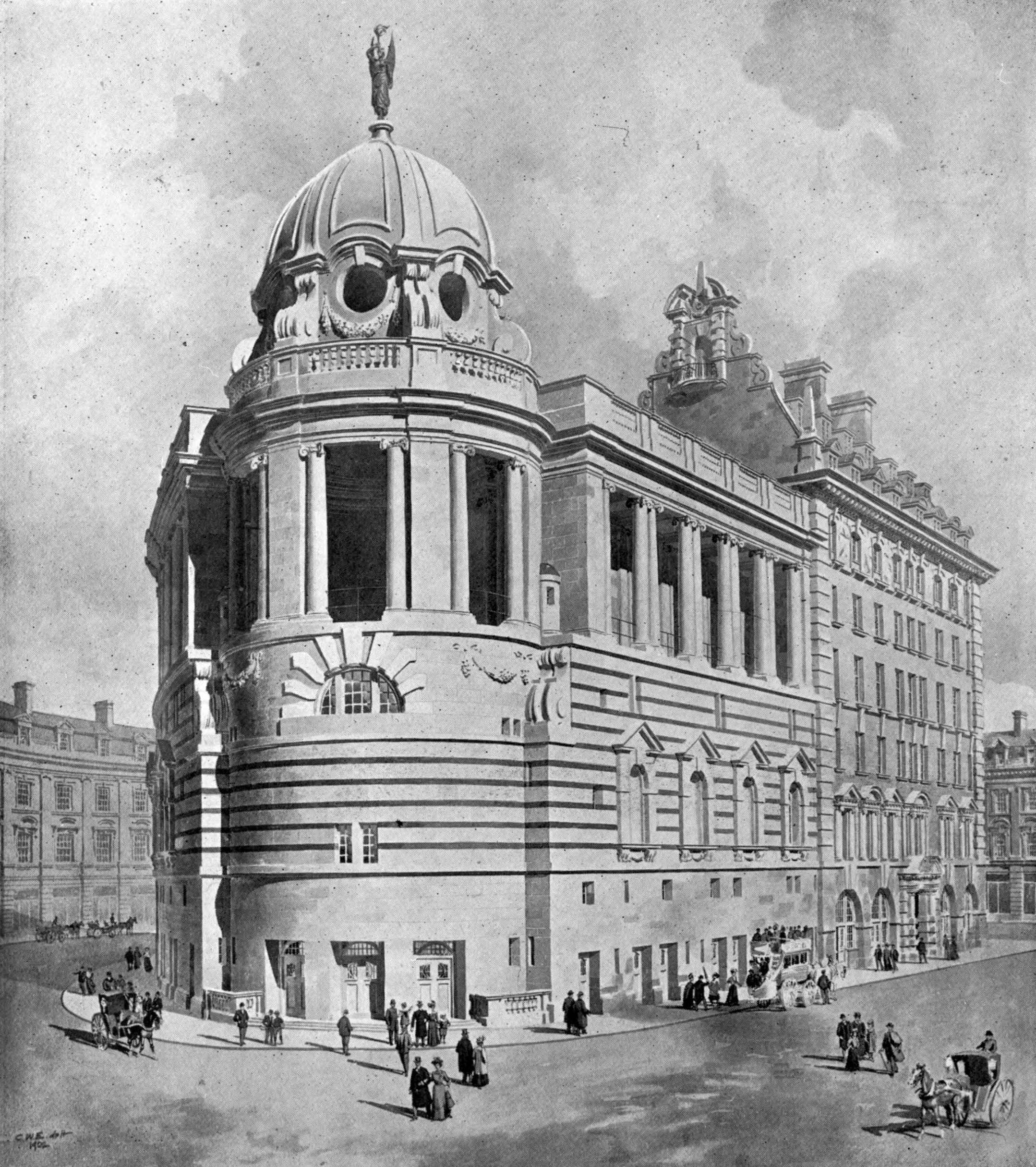
- Interactive map of Gaiety Theatre
- Address: Aldwych; Westminster
- Coordinates: 51°30′43″N 00°07′07″W
- Capacity: 2,000 seats on four levels (1864)
- Current use: The Silken Hotel

Construction
- Opened: 1864
- Closed: 1939 (demolished 1956)
- Rebuilt: 1868 C. J. Phipps; 1903 Ernest Runtz and George Ford
- Architect: Bassett and Keeling

The Gaiety Theatre was a West End theatre in Westminster, London, located on Aldwych at the eastern end of the Strand. The theatre was first established as the Strand Musick Hall in 1864 on the former site of the Lyceum Theatre. In 1868, it became known as the Gaiety Theatre and was, at first, known for music hall and then for musical burlesque, pantomime and operetta performances. From 1868 to the 1890s, it had a major influence on the development of modern musical comedy.

Under the management of John Hollingshead until 1886, the theatre had early success with Robert the Devil, by W. S. Gilbert, followed by many other burlesques of operas and literary works. Many of the productions starred Nellie Farren. Hollingshead's last production at the theatre was the burlesque Little Jack Sheppard (1885–86), produced together with his successor, George Edwardes. Edwardes's first show, Dorothy, became a long-running hit. In the 1880s and 90s, the theatre had further success with a number of burlesques with original scores by the theatre's music director, Wilhelm Meyer Lutz, including Faust up to Date (1888), Carmen up to Data (1890) and Cinder Ellen up too Late (1891).

In the 1890s, the theatre introduced new style of musical theatre in London now referred to as the Edwardian musical comedy. These song-and-dance shows, featuring wisecracking leads and female dancers known as the Gaiety Girls, were extraordinarily popular, inspiring imitations at other London theatres and internationally. An early long-running hit in this genre was The Shop Girl (1894), which was followed by many similarly successful "girl"-themed musicals, and some "boy"-themed shows, at the Gaiety. The building was demolished in 1903, and the theatre was rebuilt at the corner of Aldwych and The Strand. A further series of hit musicals followed. When Edwardes died in 1915, Robert Evett, took over the management of the theatre and had a number of further successes, notably Theodore & Co (1916) and Going Up (1918). In 1939, in need of refurbishment, the theatre closed and stood empty during World War II. The building suffered extensive bomb damage during air raids and stood empty until it was demolished in 1956.

== Beginnings ==
The theatre was financed by a joint stock company and built in 1864 as the Strand Musick Hall by Bassett and Keeling. This large theatre, with over 2,000 seats, was built at a time when many new theatres were being built in London. Unlike at many other music halls, the proprietors decided to ban smoking and drinking within the hall, and these activities were accommodated in the adjacent saloons.

A novel gas lighting system was incorporated in the hall, using prisms and mirrors to create a soft light. Exhausting the heat of the gas jets drew fresh air into the building. The house was approached through an ambitious arcade, from the Strand. This was never successful and, with the theatre, was demolished to allow the building of the Aldwych in 1903.

== Hollingshead years ==
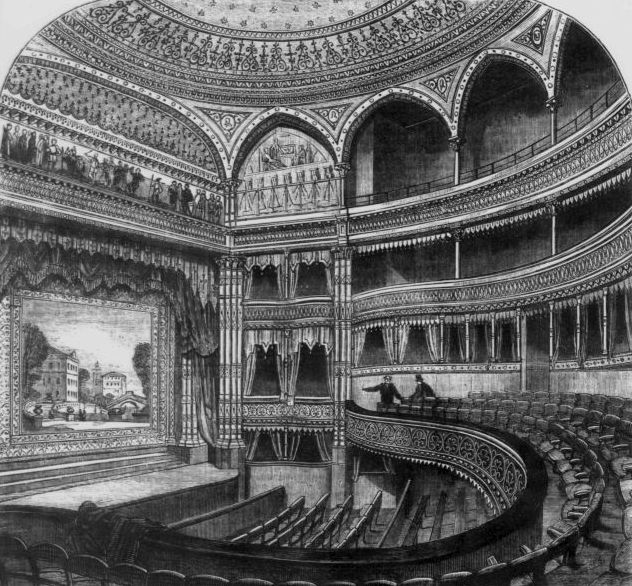
Interior of the Gaiety, 1869

In 1868, the theatre was sumptuously rebuilt by John Hollingshead as the Gaiety Theatre (announcing its dramatic policy in its name), on a nearby prominent site at the centre of the Aldwych, facing the eastern end of the Strand. It was designed by the theatre architect C. J. Phipps, who also designed the Gaiety Theatre (1871) in Dublin. A restaurant operated in the building, and patrons could eat before seeing the show and then go directly to their seats without having to worry about the weather outside.

The Gaiety Theatre opened on 21 December 1868, with On the Cards and several companion pieces, including the successful Robert the Devil, by W. S. Gilbert, a burlesque of the opera Robert le Diable. The theatre was a venue primarily for burlesque, variety, continental operetta and light comedy under the management of John Hollingshead from 1868 to 1886, including several operettas by Jacques Offenbach and musical burlesques arranged by the theatre's music director, Wilhelm Meyer Lutz. Gilbert also wrote An Old Score for the theatre in 1869.

Nellie Farren soon became the theatre's star "principal boy" in all the burlesques and played in other comedies. She and comic Fred Leslie starred at the theatre for over 20 years, with Edward Terry for much of that period. Her husband, Robert Soutar was an actor, stage manager and writer for the theatre. A typical evening at the Gaiety might include a three-act comic play, a dramatic interlude, a musical extravaganza, which might also include a ballet or pantomime (in the tradition of a Harlequinade). During such four-hour-long bills-of-fare, regular patrons might skip an item on the programme to eat in one of the theatre's plush restaurants, play billiards in the on-site Billiard Room or drink in one of its several bars.

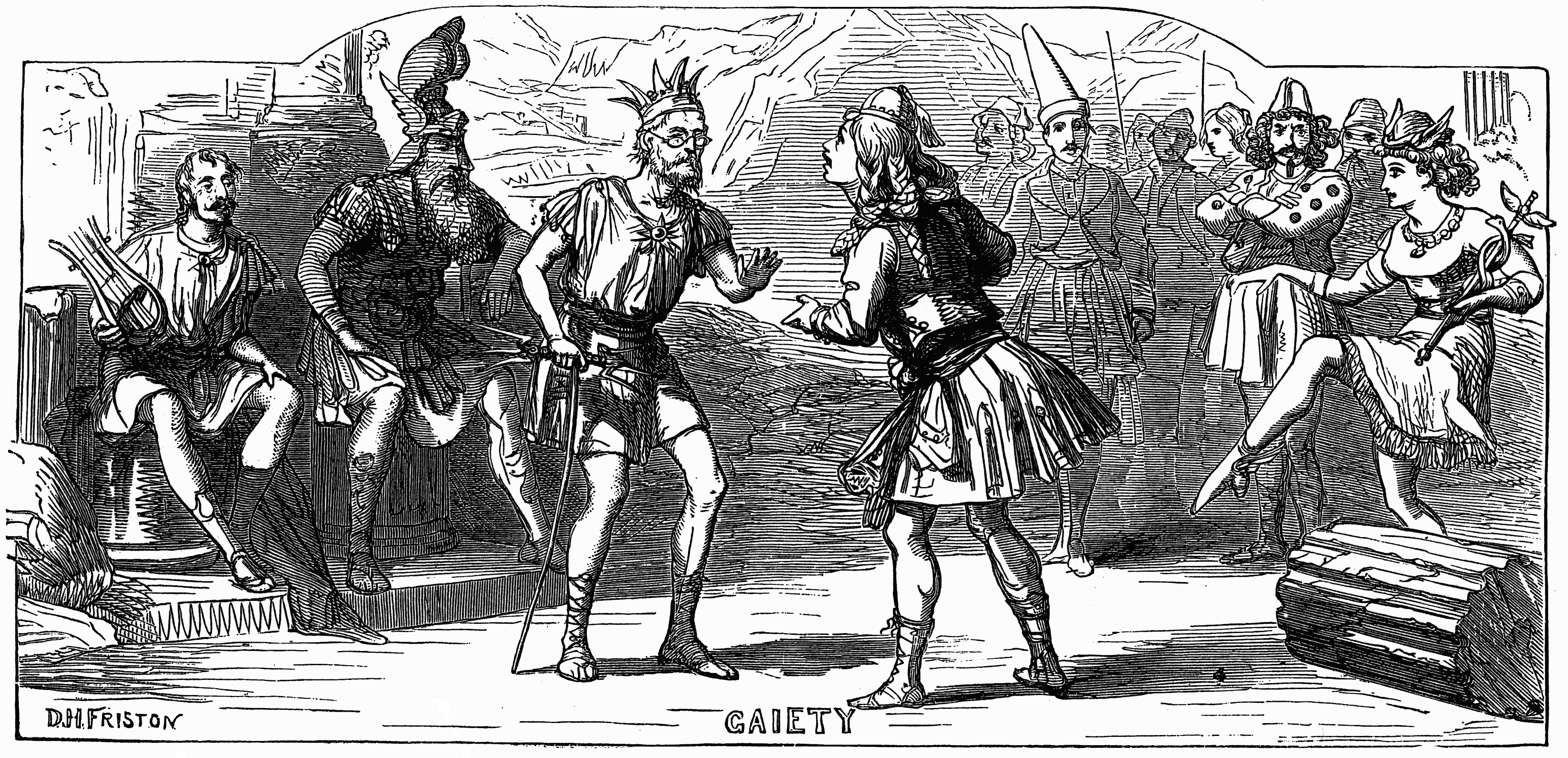
A contemporary illustration of Thespis from The Illustrated London News of 6 January 1872

In 1870, H. J. Byron's Uncle Dick's Darling starred a young Henry Irving. This was the last play that theatre buff Charles Dickens saw before his death. Irving also played in the popular and frequently played comical interlude, The Trial of Mr. Pickwick, with Gaiety favourites J. L. Toole and Nellie Farren, who played Sam Weller. Thespis, the first collaboration between Gilbert and Sullivan, played at the theatre in 1871, with Farren as Mercury and J. L. Toole in the title role. Offenbach's Les deux aveugles played in 1872, starring Fred Sullivan. Two Dion Boucicault plays produced here in the early 1870s were Night and Morning and Led Astray. Among other burlesques written by Byron for the theatre from 1876 to 1879, he travestied Boucicault's Don Caesar de Bazan as Little Don Caesar de Bazan. In the late 1870s, the theatre became the first to install electric lighting on its frontstage.

On 15 December 1880, the theatre presented Quicksands, the first major English language adaptation of a drama by Henrik Ibsen. It was adapted by W. H. Vernon from Ibsen's The Pillars of Society. Lutz and Robert Reece's version of The Forty Thieves was performed in 1880 (following an 1878 charity production of the same story), and Aladdin in 1881. In 1883, F. C. Burnand wrote a burlesque of The Tempest called Ariel for the theatre. Galatea, or Pygmalion Reversed was another 1883 burlesque. Hollingshead's last production at the theatre was the burlesque Little Jack Sheppard (1885–86), produced together with his successor, George Edwardes. Hollingshead called himself a "licensed dealer in legs, short skirts, French adaptations, Shakespeare, taste and musical glasses."

== Edwardes years ==
1894: Arthur Williams as William Lurcher (A Sheriff's Officer), in Dorothy

Edwardes's first show was Dorothy. Although Dorothy called itself a comic opera, as did most of the British musical works of the era that were neither burlesque, pantomime nor low farce, Dorothy incorporated some of the elements that US duo Harrigan and Hart were using on Broadway, integrating music and dance into the story line of the comedy. Edwardes sold that production, but it went on to become the longest-running hit that the musical stage had ever seen. Edwardes then returned the theatre to burlesque for a half dozen more years. However, in the 1860s and 1870s, burlesques were one-act pieces running less than an hour and using pastiches and parodies of popular songs, opera arias and other music that the audience would readily recognise. Edwardes expanded the format, adding an original score composed chiefly by Meyer Lutz, and the shows were extended to a full-length two- or three-act format.

These "new burlesques" included Little Jack Sheppard (1885), Monte Cristo Jr. (1886), Miss Esmeralda (1887), Faust up to Date (1888), Ruy Blas and the Blasé Roué (1888), Carmen up to Data (1890), Joan of Arc by Adrian Ross and J. L. Shine (1891) and Cinder Ellen up too Late (1891). John D'Auban acted as the theatre's ballet-master and choreographed the Gaiety burlesques and other pieces from 1868 to 1891. Comedian E. J. Lonnen joined the Gaiety for many of Lutz's burlesques. After these, however, the age of burlesque was coming to an end, and with the retirement of Nellie Farren and Fred Leslie, it was essentially over.

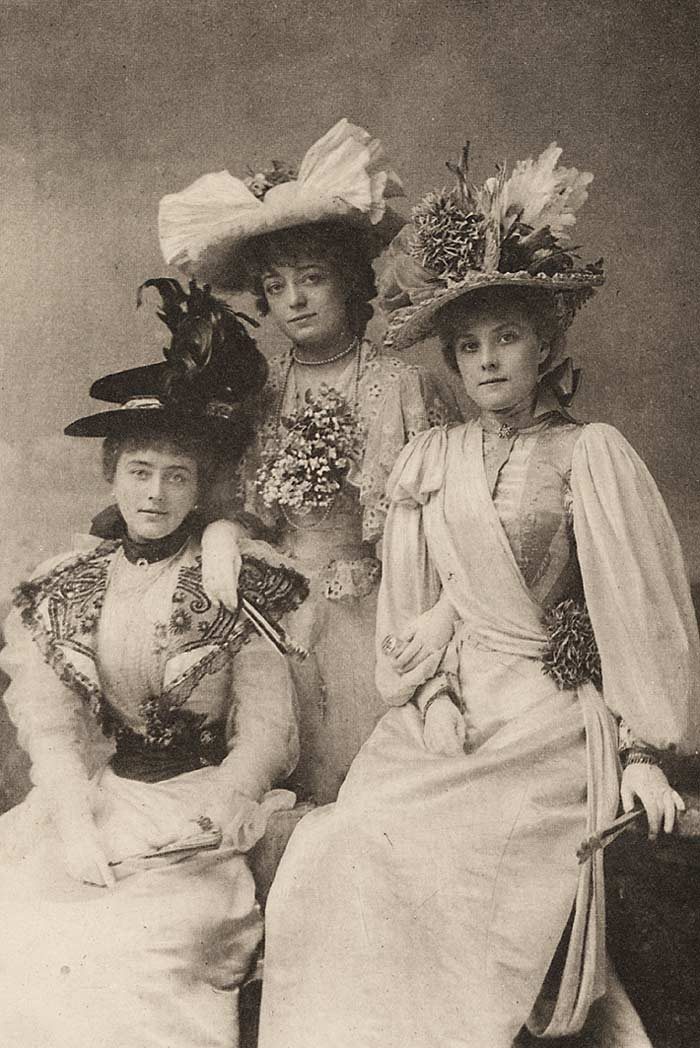
Gaiety Girls, 1896

For Joan of Arc, Edwardes had hired a young writer, Adrian Ross, who next wrote a less baudy, more lightly comic piece, similar to Dorothy, with a minimum of plot, focusing on songs with clever lyrics, In Town (1892), with stylish costumes and urbane, witty banter. Edwardes also engaged Ivan Caryll as resident composer and music director at the Gaiety and soon put Caryll together with the writing team of Owen Hall, Harry Greenbank, Ross and Lionel Monckton. Edwardes and this team created a series of musical shows similar to Dorothy, but taking its lighter, breezier style a step further. These shows featured fashionable characters, tuneful music, romantic lyrics, witty banter and pretty dancing. The success of the first of these, A Gaiety Girl (1893), which played at other theatres, confirmed Edwardes on the path he was taking.

For the next two decades, the "girl" musicals packed the Gaiety Theatre, including titles like The Shop Girl (1894), My Girl (1896), The Circus Girl (1896), and A Runaway Girl (1898), each running for hundreds of performances. A particular attraction of the Gaiety shows was the beautiful, dancing Gaiety Girls. These were fashionable, elegant young ladies, unlike the corseted actresses from the burlesques. Gaiety Girls were polite, well-behaved young women and became a popular attraction and a symbol of ideal womanhood. Some became popular leading actresses. The young ladies appearing in George Edwardes's shows became so popular that wealthy gentlemen, termed "Stage Door Johnnies", would wait outside the stage door hoping to escort them to dinner. In some cases, a marriage into society and even the nobility resulted. Edwardes arranged with Romano's restaurant, on the Strand, for his girls to dine there at half-price. It was good exposure for the girls and made Romano's the centre of London's night-life.

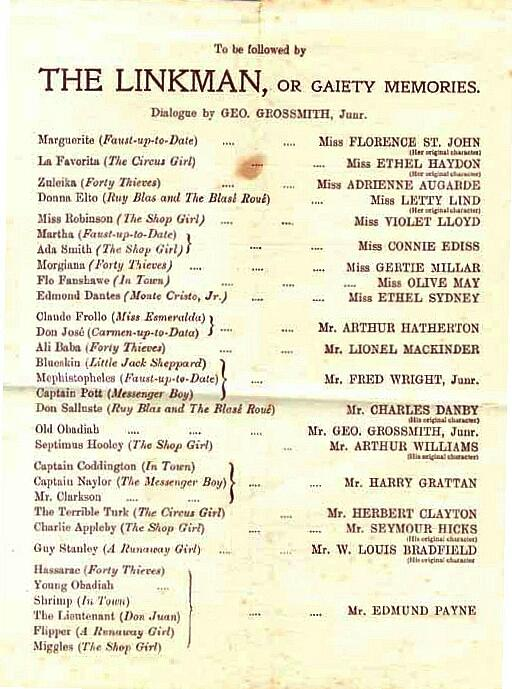
Part of the programme for the old Gaiety's farewell performance

Alan Hyman, an expert on burlesque theatre who penned the 1972 book The Gaiety Years, wrote:

At the old Gaiety in the Strand the chorus was becoming a matrimonial agency for girls with ambitions to marry into the peerage and began in the nineties when Connie Gilchrist, a star of the Old Gaiety, married the 7th Earl of Orkney and then in 1901, the 4th Marquess of Headfort married Rosie Boote, who had charmed London the previous year when she sang Maisie in The Messenger Boy. After Connie Gilchrist and Rosie Boote had started the fashion a score of the Guv'nor's budding stars left him to marry peers or men of title while other Gaiety Girls settled for a banker or a stockbroker. The Guv'nor finding this was playing ducks and drakes with his theatrical plans had a 'nuptial clause' inserted in every contract.... Debutantes were competing with the other girls to get into the Gaiety chorus while upper-class youths were joining the ranks of the chorus boys.

The building was demolished in 1903 as part of the road widening of the East Strand and the new Aldwych-Kingsway road development, and Edwardes quickly built the New Gaiety Theatre, designed by Ernest Runtz, at the corner of Aldwych and the Strand. The site of the old Gaiety is now the One Aldwych hotel. The Orchid (1903) opened the new theatre, followed by another string of long-running hits: The Spring Chicken (1905), The Girls of Gottenberg (1907), Our Miss Gibbs (1909), Peggy (1911), The Sunshine Girl (1912), The Girl on the Film (1913), Adele (1914), and After the Girl (1914).

Perhaps to balance the "girl" musicals for which the Gaiety was famous, Edwardes also presented a series of "boy"-themed musicals, such as The Messenger Boy (1900), The Toreador (1901, which introduced Gertie Millar), Two Naughty Boys (1906), The New Aladdin (1906) and Havana (1908). Later, George Grossmith, Jr. and Edward Laurillard produced a number of successes at the theatre, including Tonight's the Night (1915) and Theodore & Co (1916). Many of these popular musicals toured after their runs at the Gaiety, both in the British provinces and internationally. Leopold Wenzel conducted during the Edwardian period, leaving the theatre in 1913.

== Later years and demise ==
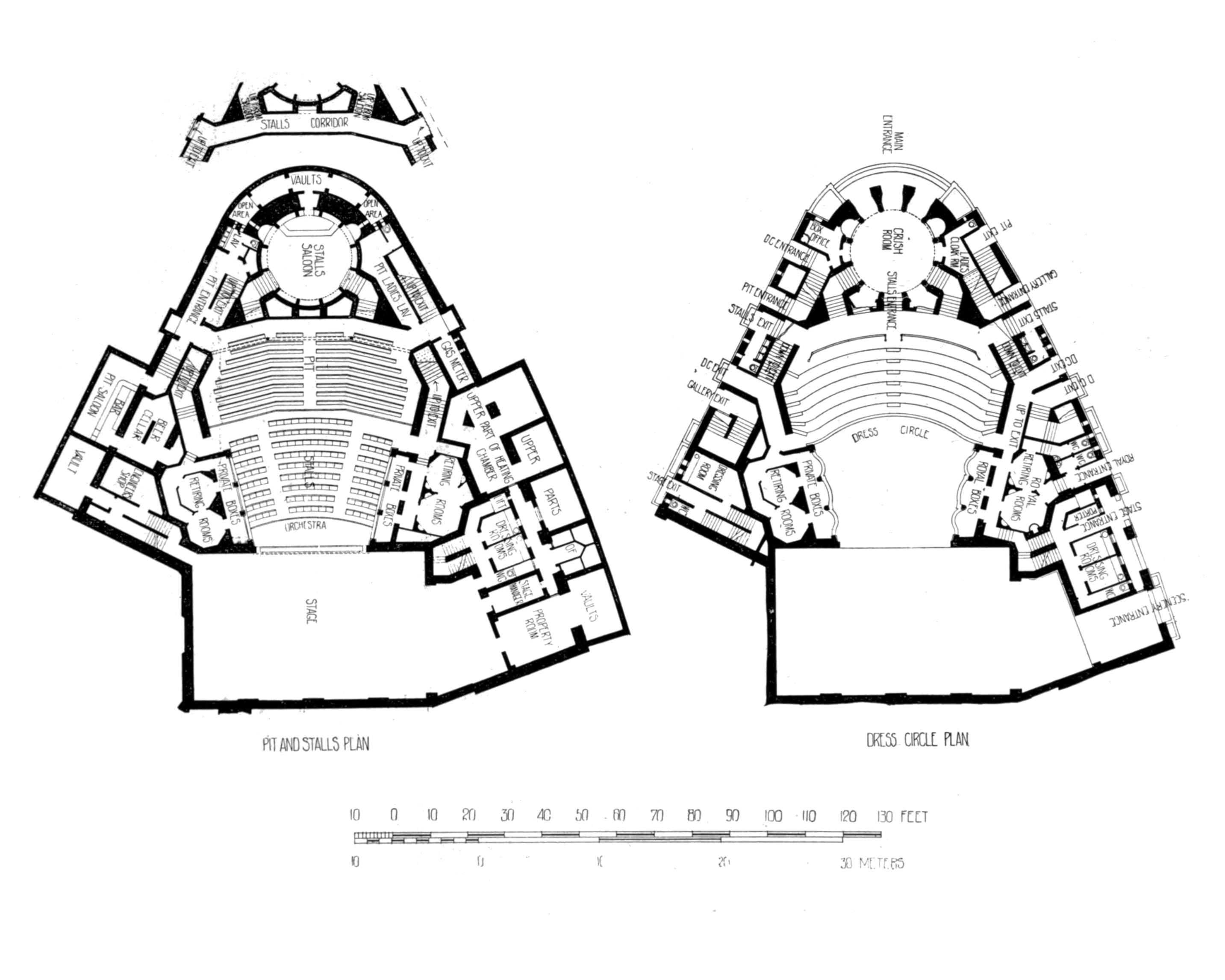
Plans of the New Gaiety Theatre, designed by Ernest Runtz in 1902

Edwardes died in 1915, leaving his estate indebted and his theatres (including the Gaiety and Daly's Theatre) in the hands of Robert Evett, formerly a leading tenor of the D'Oyly Carte Opera Company. Manuel Klein was music director at the Gaiety for several years beginning in 1915. Under Evett's management, the theatre prospered first with Theodore & Co, then with another hit, Going Up (1918), followed by The Kiss Call (1919), and Faust on Toast (1921). In 1922, Evett produced Gaiety adaptations of Catherine and The Last Waltz, a work of which he was co-author. The same year, the revue Pins and Needles opened starring the French beauty Agnès Souret and had a run of nine months before transferring to the Shubert Theatre, New York. In 1924, Evett produced Our Nell, the revised version of Our Peg. His last production was in 1925.

Musicals continued at the Gaiety. In 1929, Love Lies, by Stanley Lupino and Arthur Rigby, starring Cyril Ritchard and Madge Elliott, had a successful run at the theatre. In the 1930s, the theatre played works such as Sporting Love (1934) by composer and pianist Billy Mayerl, also with Lupino, which ran for 302 performances. The last show at the theatre was the farce Running Riot, in 1939.

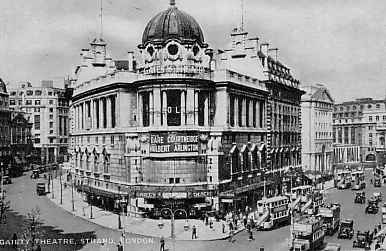
The theatre in the 1920s

By 1938 the Gaiety Theatre was in need of refurbishment. However, the theatre no longer conformed to the then current licensing regulations, and so extensive modernisation was required. This was not considered to be financially viable and in 1939 the Gaiety Theatre closed. The interior fittings were stripped from the building, and sold at auction. Some of these interior fittings can now be found in the first floor Theatre Bar of The Victoria public house in Bayswater. Standing empty during World War II, the building suffered further damage as a result of bombing during air raids.

In 1946 the shell of the Gaiety Theatre was purchased by Lupino Lane for £200,000. It was the intention to rebuild the theatre and make it, once again, a centre of musical comedy. Although restoration did commence, it was found that the structural problems were worse than expected and the work discontinued. The building was once again sold, resulting in it being demolished in 1956 and replaced by an office development.

In 2006, a new luxury hotel was begun on the site, the Silken Hotel, designed by Foster & Partners. At the rear, one of the walls of the old restaurant, which has listed building status, was to be incorporated into the new development. However, work on the hotel was halted in 2008 when the developers went bankrupt. The building was later completed and contains private apartments and the ME London Hotel, opening in 2012.

== See also ==
- Gaiety Girls
