= Robert Reece =

British dramatist (1838–1891)

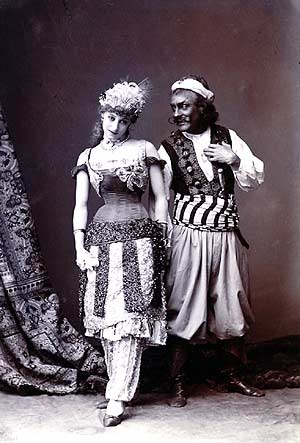
Reece's The Forty Thieves, 1880

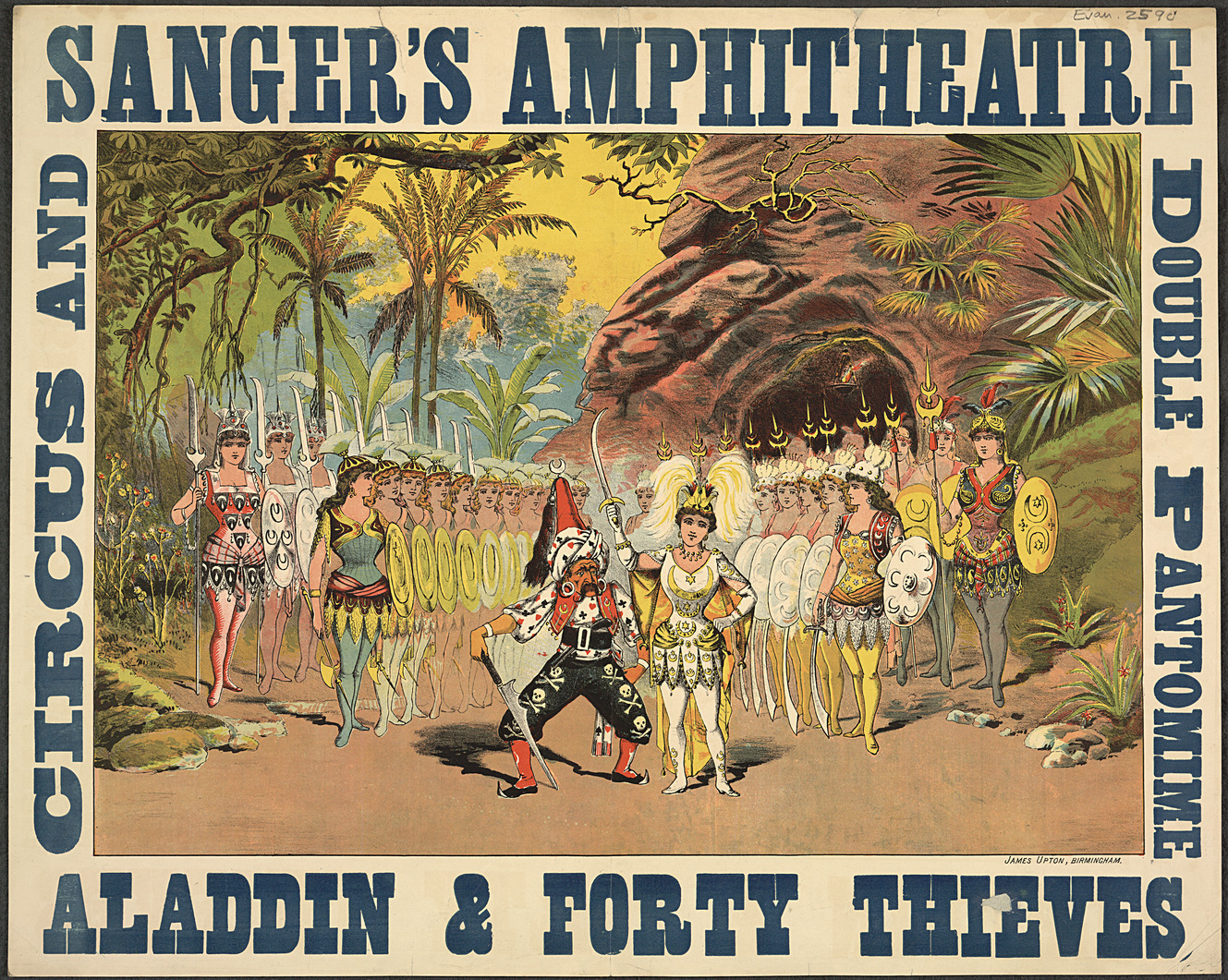
Poster for an 1886 production of Reece's Aladdin and the Forty Thieves

Robert Reece (2 May 1838 – 8 July 1891) was a British comic playwright and librettist active in the Victorian era. He wrote many successful musical burlesques, comic operas, farces and adaptations from the French, including the English-language adaptation of the operetta Les cloches de Corneville, which became the longest-running piece of musical theatre in history up to that time. He sometimes collaborated with Henry Brougham Farnie or others.

== Early life and career ==
Reece was born in the island of Barbados, West Indies. His father, Robert Reece (1808–1874), was a barrister of the Inner Temple. Reece matriculated from Balliol College, Oxford in 1857 and received his B.A. in 1860 and his M.A. in 1864. He was admitted a student at the Inner Temple in 1860 but was not called to the bar. For a short time he was a medical student. Between 1861 and 1863, he was an extra clerk in the office of the ecclesiastical commissioners, and from 1864 to 1868 an extra temporary clerk to the emigration commissioners.

From the 1860s to the 1880s, Reece wrote comic pieces for the stage with fair success, often adapting three-act European operettas into two-act English-language pieces. He even scored a number of hits, including his adaptation of Les cloches de Corneville, which ran for over 700 performances in 1878–79, the longest run in the history of musical theatre up to that time.

Reece's first professionally produced effort was the libretto of an operetta, Castle Grim, with music by G. Allen, produced at the Royalty Theatre in 1865. Among his subsequent contributions to the same stage were the burlesques Prometheus (1865), The Lady of the Lake (1866), and Whittington Junior and his Sensation Cat (1871, starring Fred Sullivan and Henrietta Hodson). He also wrote for the Royalty Dora's Device, a comedietta (1871), Little Robin Hood, a burlesque (1871), revived at the Gaiety Theatre (1882), and Paquita, or Love in a Trance, a comic opera with music by J. A. Mallandine (1871).

At the Queen's Theatre, he produced The Stranger, stranger than Ever, a burlesque (1868). Another burlesque the same year at the Prince of Wales's Theatre was Agamemnon and Cassandra

== Later years ==
He wrote many other burlesques for the Globe Theatre, the Olympic Theatre (including Richelieu in 1873 and Clockwork in 1877), the Vaudeville Theatre (including Green Old Age, with music by Frederic Clay, in 1874; and a burlesque, Ruy Blas Righted), the Strand Theatre, and the Gaiety. At the Gaiety, he produced fourteen pieces between 1872 and 1884, among them the pantomimes Ali Baba (1872), Don Giovanni in Venice (1873), The Forty Thieves, (written with F. C. Burnand, H. J. Byron and W. S. Gilbert) (1878) and another version of the same story, with music by Meyer Lutz in 1880; and the burlesques Aladdin, (1881); Little Robin Hood, (1882); and Valentine and Orson, (1882).

He collaborated with Henry Brougham Farnie on 15 libretti or adaptations and occasionally joined with other dramatic writers. With Farnie, for the Folly Theatre in London, he wrote Up the River, or the Strict Kew-Tea (1877); Stars and Garters (1878); his biggest success, Les cloches de Corneville (1878); and The Creole. For the Comedy Theatre, he wrote Boccaccio, with music by Franz von Suppé (1882). He also wrote the successful burlesque, Carmen; or Sold for a Song (1879) for the Folly Theatre. The Highest Bidder played in New York in 1887, starring E. H. Sothern.

In 1875, he wrote Cattarina, a comic opera with music by Frederic Clay, produced at the Charing Cross Theatre, and in 1879 he wrote the comic opera La Petite Mademoiselle, together with Henry Sambrooke Leigh, for the Alhambra Theatre. Also for the Alhambra, in 1881 he wrote an English-language adaptation of Jeanne, Jeannette and Jeanneton, a grand opera by P. Lacome after an original libretto by Clairville & Delacour.

Despite all of his successful work, Reece fell on hard times in the 1880s. He died in London at the age of 53 and was buried in Kensal Green Cemetery.
