= Furneaux Cook =

English opera singer and actor

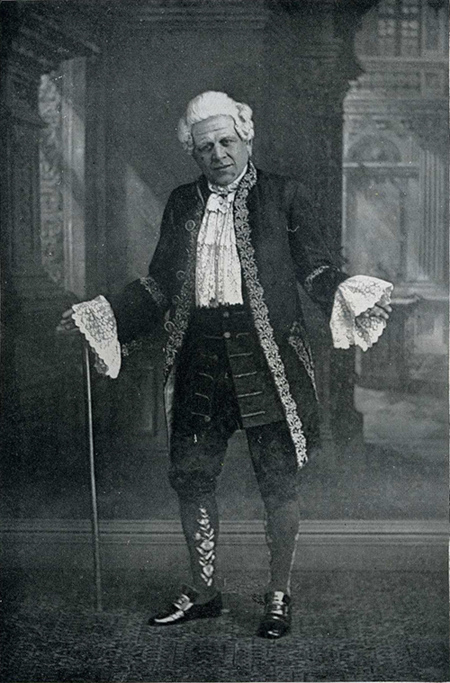
Cook as Squire Bantam in Dorothy

Furneaux Cook (1839 – 19 January 1903), born John Furneaux Cook, was an English opera singer and actor best known for baritone roles in the comic operas of Gilbert and Sullivan and Alfred Cellier on the London stage. Cook appeared on stage for over 30 years in London, the British provinces and America.

== Life and career ==
Cook was the brother of opera singer Aynsley Cook and fellow Savoyard Alice Aynsley Cook (1849–1938).

=== Early career and D'Oyly Carte ===
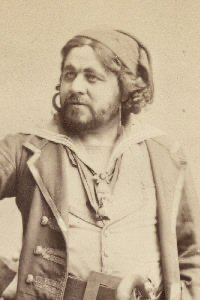
Cook as Samuel in The Pirates of Penzance (1879)

One of Cook's earliest professional engagements was in the obscure Michael Balfe opera, Letty the Basketmaker, produced by John Hollingshead at the Gaiety Theatre in London in 1868. This was played as part of the same programme with W. S. Gilbert's burlesque Robert the Devil. Cook also played Peter the Watchman in the burlesque Cinderella the Younger (by Alfred Thompson, composed by Émile Jonas) at the Gaiety in 1871, and the title character in The Sultan of Mocha, by Alfred Cellier, in Manchester in 1874–75.

Cook then joined one of Richard D'Oyly Carte's touring companies in 1878 in Gilbert and Sullivan's The Sorcerer, playing the vicar, Doctor Daly, and also Old Matthew in the curtain-raiser Breaking the Spell, by H. B. Farnie, based on Jacques Offenbach's Le violoneux. From 1879 to 1880, he travelled to America with Gilbert, Sullivan and the D'Oyly Carte Opera Company to present the authorised version of H.M.S. Pinafore, in which he played Dick Deadeye, and The Pirates of Penzance, in which he created the role of Samuel first in New York and then in Philadelphia, where he moved up to the larger roles of Sergeant of Police in Pirates and Captain Corcoran in Pinafore. He also played Dr. Daly on this tour. On 23 April 1880, the company gave a benefit for Cook consisting of Pinafore and the second act of Pirates, in which Cook played Deadeye, Corcoran (apparently one in each act), and the Sergeant.

Cook left the company upon his return to England, appearing later in 1880 and 1881 in The King's Dragoons in Manchester and Liverpool, and in then in La Belle Normande and The Grand Mogul in London. Re-joining the D'Oyly Carte organisation at the end of 1881, he played Sir Marmaduke Pointdextre in The Sorcerer and Corcoran in Pinafore. In 1883, Cook joined Kate Santley's company at the Royalty Theatre in The Merry Duchess by George R. Sims and Frederic Clay in the role of Farmer Bowman. In 1884–86, he was back with D'Oyly Carte, touring as Dick Deadeye in Pinafore, the Sergeant in Pirates, Archibald Grosvenor in Patience (in 1884 only), the Earl of Mountararat in Iolanthe (in 1885 only) and Pooh-Bah in The Mikado (in 1885–86). In 1884, he also played Cox in a series of matinees of Cox and Box at the Royal Court Theatre with Richard Temple and Arthur Cecil. He then retired from the D'Oyly Carte company.

=== Later career ===
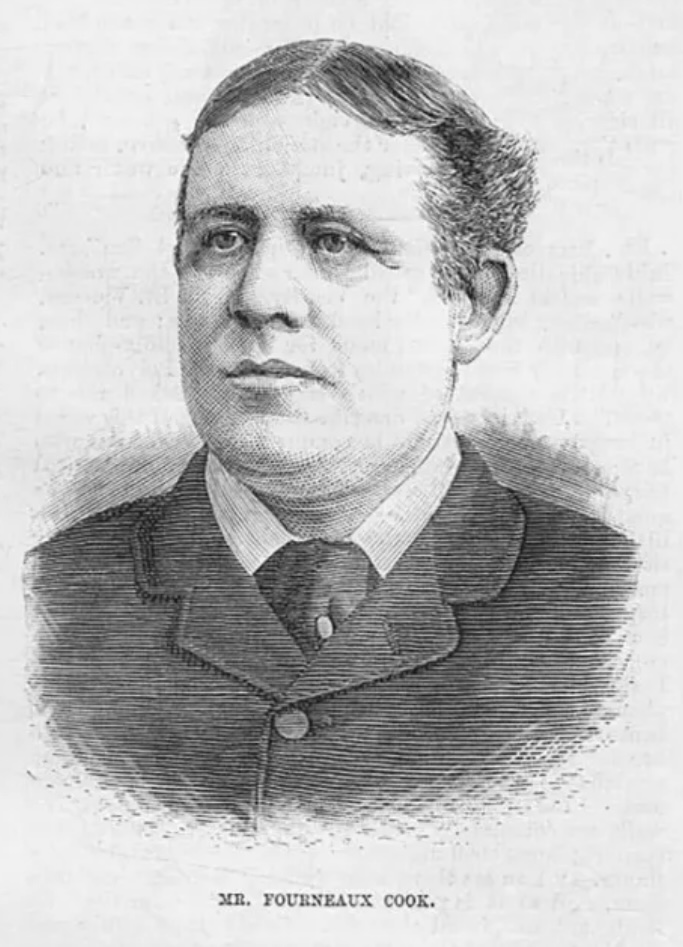
Cook in 1883

After this, Cook created the role of Squire Bantam in the hit comic opera, Dorothy, by Cellier and librettist B. C. Stephenson in September 1886. In the show, he was assigned the song 'Here's a welcome to all at Chanticleer Hall.' This show enjoyed a record-setting two-year run. Next, he appeared as Alderman Shelton in Cellier and Stephenson's Doris in 1889.

After this, Cook continued to act in London for another ten years. In 1892, he appeared in Gilbert and Cellier's The Mountebanks (Cellier's last opera) as innkeeper Elvino di Pasta. In 1893, he played in Little Christopher Columbus, a very successful musical burlesque with music by Ivan Caryll and Gustave Kerker and a libretto by George Robert Sims and Cecil Raleigh. In 1894, Cook was in The House of Lords by Harry Greenbank with music by George Byng (who conducted some of the 1920s recordings of the Gilbert and Sullivan operas) and Ernest Ford.

Cook was the recipient of a benefit matinee performance of Dorothy at the Gaiety Theatre in June 1897, reviving his role as the Squire. His old co-stars Marie Tempest, Hayden Coffin, Florence Perry, Arthur Williams and John Le Hay reprised their roles, and Seymour Hicks, Mabel Love, Arthur Roberts and Charles Kenningham, among others, participated. His last appearance in London was as a juryman in Trial by Jury, at the Theatre Royal, Drury Lane in 1898 in a performance for the benefit of Nellie Farren.

Cook died in West Kensington, London and is buried in the West Norwood Cemetery.
