= Henry Bracy =

Welsh opera singer, director and producer (1846–1917)

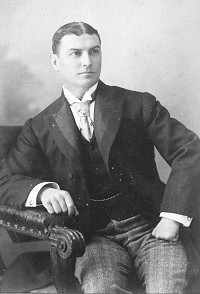
Henry Bracy in Australia, 1890s

Henry Bracy (8 January 1846 – 31 January 1917) was a Welsh opera tenor, stage director and opera producer who is best remembered as the creator of the role of Prince Hilarion in the Gilbert and Sullivan comic opera Princess Ida. Bracy often played the leading tenor role in the works in which he appeared, becoming one of the most popular comic tenors of the Victorian era. His wife, Clara, was an actress.

After beginning his career in Plymouth, Bracy spent four years performing at London's Gaiety Theatre in the early 1870s. He and his wife then travelled to Australia, where they performed in French operettas for the rest of the decade. They returned to Britain in 1880, continuing in operetta roles. In 1884, Bracy originated the role of Hilarion, after which he further built his reputation in British comic opera and operetta. In 1888, the Bracys returned to Australia. After a season at the Sydney Opera House and touring in operettas, the Bracys joined the J. C. Williamson organisation, by which he was employed for most of his ensuing career, until 1914, as a performer, stage manager, stage director and casting agent. His occasional attempts at theatre management on his own behalf brought him financial losses and forced him to declare bankruptcy in 1897.

== Early life and career ==
Bracy was born in 1846 as Samuel Thomas Dunn in Maesteg, South Wales, the son of an ironworks manager.

He began his theatrical career in 1866 at the Plymouth Theatre and spent three seasons with the company before making his London debut at John Hollingshead's Gaiety Theatre in 1870. Bracy appeared at the Gaiety for nearly four years. In 1873, Bracy was employed as a principal tenor with the Opera Comique in London.

In September 1873, Bracy and his wife, Clara (born Clara Rose Hodges), half-sister of Lydia Thompson, traveled to Australia to perform in Jacques Offenbach's operetta Lischen et Fritzchen at the Theatre Royal in Melbourne, and Bracy appeared in 1874 as Rosencrantz in Hamlet.

They continued in various parts in Australia before being engaged by Irish musical impresario William Saurin Lyster to lead a season of French operetta, with Bracy also stage managing. For Lyster, they performed in operettas for five years including in Lecocq's La fille de Madame Angot and Giroflé Girofla. Offenbach pieces included The Grand Duchess of Gerolstein, La belle Hélène, Barbe-bleue, La Périchole, and Les brigands, as well as Hervé's Chilpéric was given.

These were followed by the first Australian production of Les cloches de Corneville. Clara Bracy was well received by the press. During these years, the couple took a tour of the United States in 1876.

In 1880, the couple returned to Britain, where Bracy undertook the role of Hector in the hit London production of Madame Favart, replacing Walter H. Fisher. He also appeared in roles during the early 1880s in Les Mousquetaires (1880 at the Globe Theatre); as Frittelini in Audran's long-running production of La mascotte (1881 at the Comedy Theatre), in which his song, "Love is Blind" was a great success; and, at the Avenue Theatre, in Madame Favart (1882), Bucalossi's Les Manteaux Noirs (1882), Olivette (1883), Belle Lurette (1883) and Bluebeard (1883).

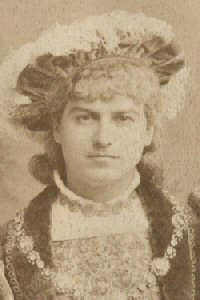
Bracy as Hilarion, 1884

In 1883, as a principal tenor of the London stage, he was approached by the D'Oyly Carte Opera Company to create the role of Prince Hilarion for Gilbert and Sullivan's new comic opera Princess Ida. The production ran at the Savoy Theatre from January 1884, and Bracy left the company in October 1884, before the end of the run. The Times wrote of his performance on the first night, "Mr. Bracy was a sprightly, although somewhat insipid, Hilarion". The Athenæum approved of his vocal performance.

Bracy then continued to build his reputation in comic opera parts in London, in productions including The Grand Mogul, by Edmond Audran and H. B. Farnie, at the Comedy Theatre, with Florence St. John, Frank Wyatt and Fred Leslie. and The Lady of the Locket, with Hayden Coffin at the Empire Theatre (1885), followed by a succession of productions at the Comedy Theatre, including Offenbach's Barbe-bleue, in which he played the title role, the London première of Jakobowski's Erminie (1885), with St. John (and later Marie Tempest) and Wyatt (1885), Caryll's The Lily of Leoville (1886), and Millöcker's The Beggar Student (1886). At the Strand Theatre, he appeared in Cellier's The Sultan of Mocha (1887). He managed some of these productions, sustaining heavy losses. In 1887, he participated as the Defendant in a performance of Trial by Jury for the benefit of Amy Roselle. Performers included Rutland Barrington, Richard Temple, Arthur Roberts and Geraldine Ulmar as principals, and W. S. Penley, George Grossmith, Kate Bishop and Marion Terry in the chorus. His last major role in Britain was the first London production of Gustave Michiels's Babette, with Florence St John at the Strand in 1888. His farewell to the West End stage was a special matinée at the Savoy Theatre, put at his disposal by Richard D'Oyly Carte, to mark his departure for Australia. Artists appearing included Williams, John Le Hay, Courtice Pounds, Durward Lely, Marie Tempest, Ben Davies, Coffin, Roberts and, in Cox and Box, Grossmith, Arthur Cecil and Temple.

== Later years ==
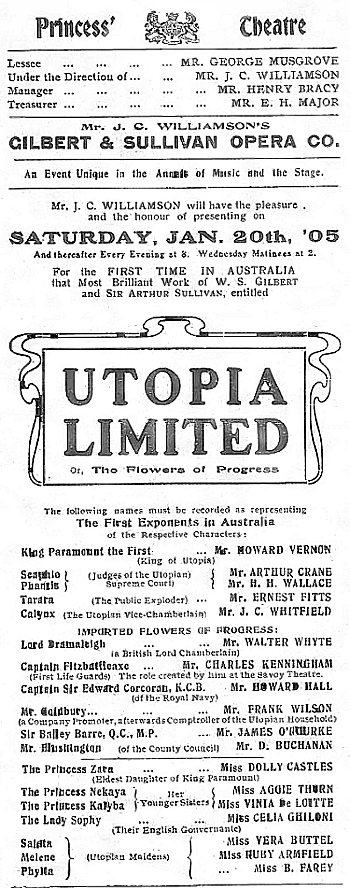
Theatre Poster for Utopia Limited managed by Bracy

In 1888 the Bracys returned to Australia, performing in concerts and then at the Sydney Opera House for a season, conducted by Henri Kowalski, in Kowalski's Moustique, The Beggar Student and Flotow's Martha, in which he was praised for his acting and singing. He was also praised for his performance in Moustique: "Mr Henry Bracy sang, as he always does with ease and sweetness, and greatly strengthened the cast. ... We could well afford to listen to Mr Bracy's pleasing voice and clear enunciation in one, or two more songs than those at present set down for him." Bracy then directed productions for John Solomon's English and Comic Opera Company for about a year, earning good notices for his roles in the productions. For example, in that company's production of The Beggar Student, a reviewer noted, "Mr. Henry Bracy has returned to all his old popularity and in his impersonation of the leading character, shows great animation and naturalness, and his singing is warmly applauded. In 1890, the Bracys led their own company in productions of The Sultan of Mocha, The Beggar Student, and The Lady of the Locket at the Criterion Theatre.

For J. C. Williamson's Royal Comic Opera Company, he had performed in Iolanthe in 1888, and in 1890 Bracy rejoined that company and was directing their Gilbert and Sullivan operas, including The Gondoliers (1890), Princess Ida (1893), H.M.S. Pinafore (1895), The Yeomen of the Guard (1896). He and Clara also performed in some of the productions, including non-Gilbert and Sullivan productions such as Planquette's The Old Guard, Audran's La cigale, Cellier's Dorothy and Pepita. In 1896, Williamson and George Musgrove disbanded the company briefly, and Bracy again tried his hand at theatre management, touring with his own troupe for nine months in 1897. Again sustaining heavy losses, he declared bankruptcy.

Bracy was re-engaged by Williamson and managed concert tours by Emma Albani in 1898 and Ada Crossley in 1903, and he directed the Bel Sorel season of grand opera. In Bracy resumed directing Williamson's Gilbert and Sullivan and other comic opera productions, in which he usually also appeared in the leading tenor role, including in Yeomen (1904), The Sorcerer (1905), Princess Ida (1905), The Mikado (1905), The Gondoliers (1905), and the first Australian production of Utopia, Limited (1905). His last role as a tenor was as Colonel Fairfax in Yeomen in 1908. He then devoted his full-time to management, casting and directing for Williamson. For example, in 1910, he directed the first Australian production of Puccini's Madame Butterfly (in English). Of his direction, The Mercury opined, "He was truly an artist, and productions that were under his direction were notable for their finish".

Clara moved to California and in 1908 appeared in D. W. Griffith's 1908 movie The Red Girl. Clara appeared in 90 films, becoming one of the earliest film actresses. Bracy and his wife had two sons, one of whom, Sidney Bracy, appeared on stage with Williamson and then in Britain and America before becoming a successful film actor. Their other son, Philip, who became a West End actor, was wounded as a young soldier. Bracy retired in 1914; Williamson had died in 1913, leaving Bracy a bequest, and upon his retirement, the company also gave him a generous pension. He then visited San Francisco, where his wife was residing while performing for Charles Frohman.

Bracy died of Cerebrovascular disease in Darlinghurst, Sydney, Australia, in 1917. He was survived by Clara and his two sons and was buried at Waverley Cemetery. At the time of Bracy's death, Clara had been living in New York with her married son, Sydney. Philip travelled from Melbourne to attend his father's funeral.
