= The Sultan of Mocha =

Comic opera by Alfred Cellier and by Albert Jarrett

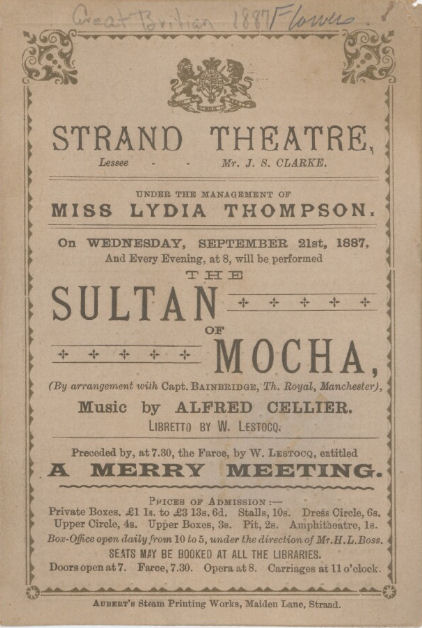
Programme for the 1887 revival of The Sultan of Mocha at the Strand Theatre

The Sultan of Mocha is a three act comic opera with a score by Alfred Cellier and a libretto by Albert Jarrett. It was first produced at the Prince's Theatre, Manchester in 1874 and revived in London in 1876 and 1887 (with a new libretto by William Lestocq) and in New York in 1880, among others.

== Productions ==
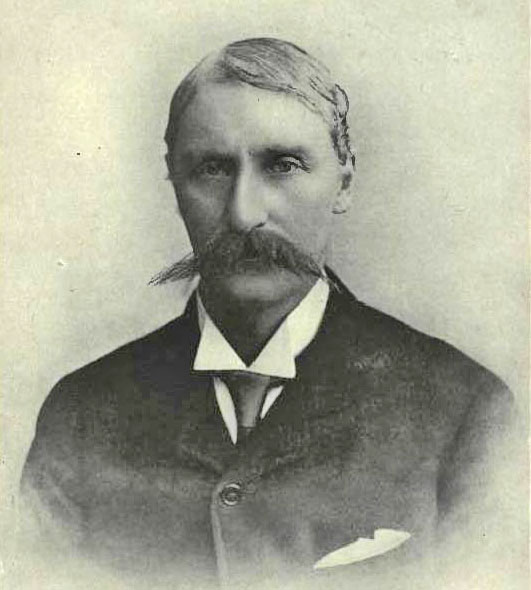
Composer Alfred Cellier c. 1880s

The musical theatre writer Kurt Gänzl describes The Sultan of Mocha as "one of the earliest British musicals of the modern era both to have a significant career at home and to win overseas productions". It was first produced in 1874 at the Prince's Theatre, Manchester by the actor-manager Charles Alexander Calvert, who "accepted a text supplied by a local gentleman of some literary attainment", Albert Jarrett (1834–1916), which was then set to music by Alfred Cellier, the musical director at Alexander's theatre. (Note: Albert Jarrett was a schoolmaster with literary aspirations who had supplied the theatre with scripts for pantomimes for some years. Jarrett was also Secretary of the Manchester Mechanics Institute, chairman of the Manchester Arts Club, and a registrar of cemeteries in Manchester.) The production borrowed a camel from the local zoo for Middle-Eastern authenticity; it ran initially for 30 performances from 16 November to 9 December 1874, with Furneaux Cook in the title role and Bessie Emmett as Dolly. The Sultan of Mocha was taken off for the annual pantomime but returned in March 1875 (for two weeks) and April 1875 (for three weeks) with largely the same cast but with tenor John Chatterson as Peter, Catherine Lewis and Emily Muir as Dolly and Furneaux Cook reprising his role as the Sultan.

Of the score, Gänzl wrote:

Cellier's music took little or no notice of the French opéra-bouffe style which had been dominant in Britain's musical theatres for the past years and which had featured in such French-composed British musicals as Aladdin II (Hervé), Cinderella the Younger (Jonas) and Whittington (Offenbach) and the spectacular The Black Crook and Babil and Bijou. Following instead the tones of Sullivan's Contrabandista and Clay's The Gentleman in Black and Cattarina, Cellier's music for The Sultan of Mocha helped establish the kind of English comic-opera score which would find its apogée in the Savoy operas and his own Dorothy.

Its first revival was at the St James' Theatre in London from 17 April to 2 June 1876, a run of 47 performances, with Constance Loseby as Dolly, George W. Anson as Admiral Sneak, Alfred Brennir as Peter and Henri Corri as the Sultan and a chorus of 70. Cellier conducted his own piece as the musical director at the theatre.

It received its American premiere in December 1878 at the Bush Street Theater in San Francisco, California, where it had a short run under the management of Alice Oates. Blanche Roosevelt produced it at the Union Square Theatre in New York with her Blanche Roosevelt English Opera Company from 14 to 25 September 1880 for a run of 13 performances with Leonora Braham as Dolly and with Cellier conducting. The work returned to Manchester in 1880, where it played at the Theatre Royal with Alice May as Dolly, Fred. J. Stimson as Flint, George Fox as the Sultan, Allen Thomas as Sneak and Frederic Wood as Peter.

The piece received various revivals thereafter including at the Strand Theatre in 1887 with a new libretto by William Lestocq and included an additional song by Paolo Tosti, with Violet Cameron, Charles Danby and Henry Bracy in the cast. Opening on 21 September 1887, this production ran for 114 performances. Cellier dedicated the score to his friend, colleague and sometime employer, Arthur Sullivan.

Following his success as Peter at the Strand Theatre Bracy took up the Australian rights to The Sultan of Mocha, producing the show with his Henry Bracy's Comic Opera Company at the Alexandra Theatre in Melbourne in November 1889 and at the Criterion Theatre in Sydney in March 1890. Bracy was Peter, Lilian Tree was Dolly, John Forde was Sneak, Knight Aston was the Sultan, Flora Granpner was Lucy and William Stevens was Flint.

== Synopsis ==
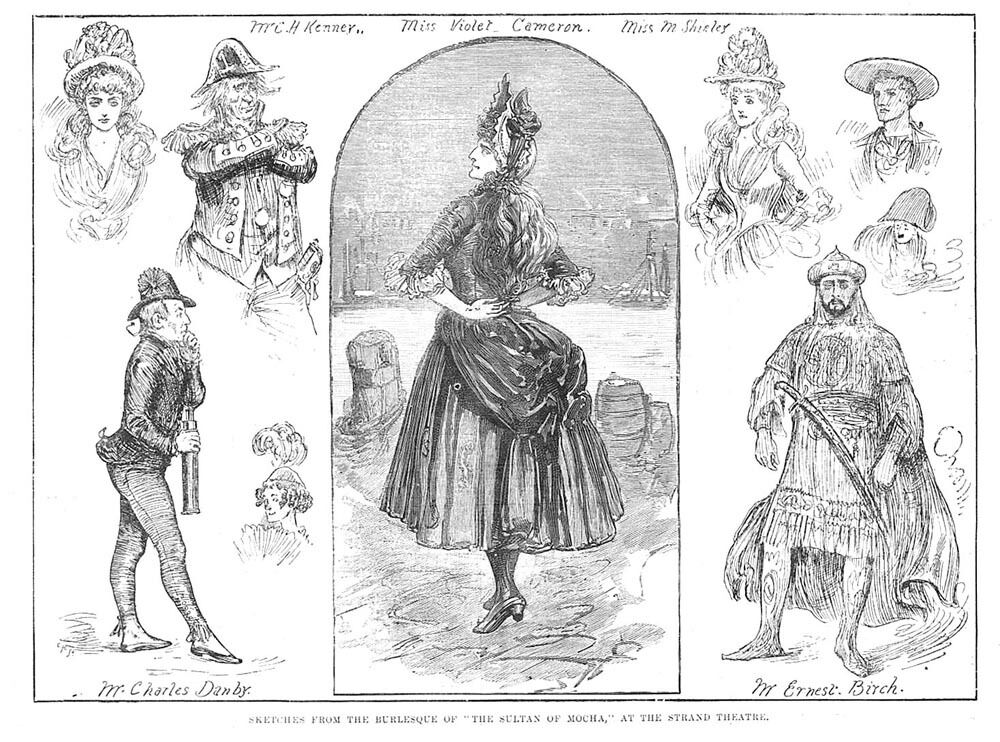
Revival of The Sultan of Mocha at the Strand Theatre (1887)

Scenes and settings in the original 1874 production:

- Act I: "The Jolly Tars", Greenwich, and River from the Park.
- Act II: The Market-place at Mocha.
- Act III: Scene 1: A Cavern on the Seashore - Scene 2: Interior of the Sultan's Palace.

Act I

Dolly receives a proposal of marriage from the wealthy ship chandler 'Admiral' Sneak, but Dolly loves another – Peter, a handsome young sailor. However, her slave-trader uncle, Captain Flint, does not regard either of these as suitable suitors for his niece and believing he can make an arrangement more advantageous to himself sails off to sea taking Dolly with him.

Act II

On the Island of Mocha, Peter and the vengeful Sneak have arrived on the beach, having followed in hot pursuit of Dolly and Captain Flint. While Captain Flint sells his slaves Shallah, the Sultan of Mocha, sees Dolly and buys her from her uncle. Dolly is rescued from this fate by Peter, but the couple are captured by Sneak who sells her to the Sultan. Dolly agrees to become the Sultana in return for Peter's freedom.

Act III

Eureka and Isadora, two members of the Sultan's harem, are vying to marry the Sultan. The Sultan is tricked into marrying Isadora when Dolly changes clothes and veil with her on the wedding day. Dolly and Peter are released and are finally united.

== Roles ==
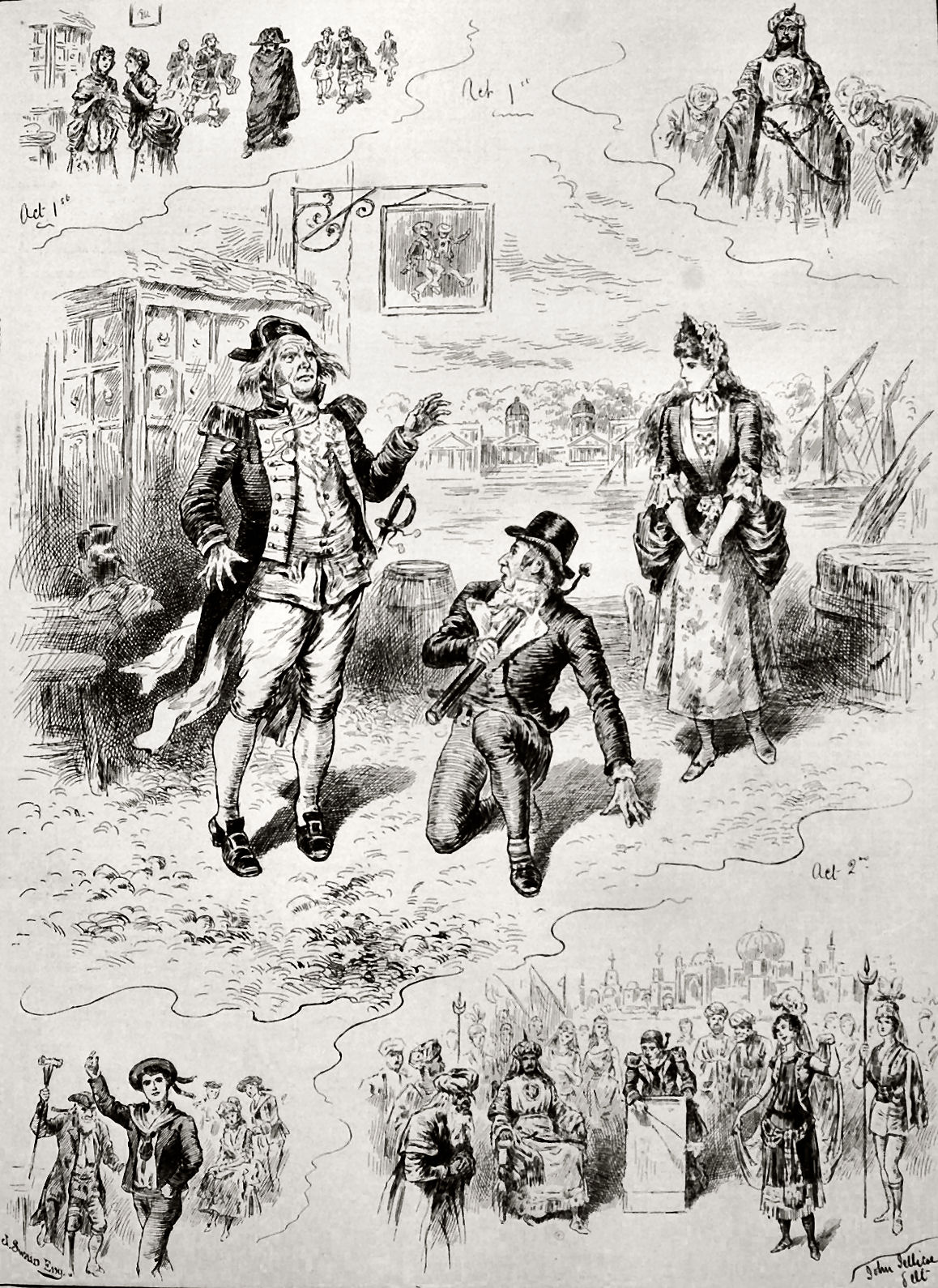
The Sultan of Mocha as drawn by John Jellicoe for The Illustrated Sporting and Dramatic News (1887)

The original 1874 production in Manchester had the following cast:

- Shallah, the Sultan of Mocha – Furneaux Cook
- Captain Flint – Henry M. Clifford
- Admiral Sneak – Frederick Mervin
- Peter – Robertha Erskine
- Dolly – Bessie Emmett

For the 1887 revival the version of 1874 underwent a major rewriting, with Admiral Sneak, a villain in 1874 becoming Dolly's father, while other characters disappear and others appear. The new cast included:

- H. H. The Seyd Shallah, Sultan of Mocha – Ernest Birch
- Admiral Sneak (Father of Dolly) – C. H. Kenney
- Captain Flint (a Marine Store Dealer) – Charles Danby
- Peter (a Heart of Oak) – Henry Bracy
- Lord Chamberlain – C. Wrexford
- Grand Vizier – Leonard Calvert
- Frank (a Sailor) – L. Batten
- Blackwall Bill – J. Harvey
- Chief of Pirates – Calder O'Byrne
- Head Slave – Mr Edwards
- Dolly (the Lass that loves a Sailor) – Violet Cameron
- Lucy (her Friend) – Madeleine Shirley
- Isidore – Florence Melville
- Eureka – Florence Montgomery
- Haidee (Dancing Girl) – Florence Levey

Greenwich People, Pensioners, Watchmen, Slaves, Sailors, Villagers, Corsairs, Guards, Odalisques, etc.

== Songs ==
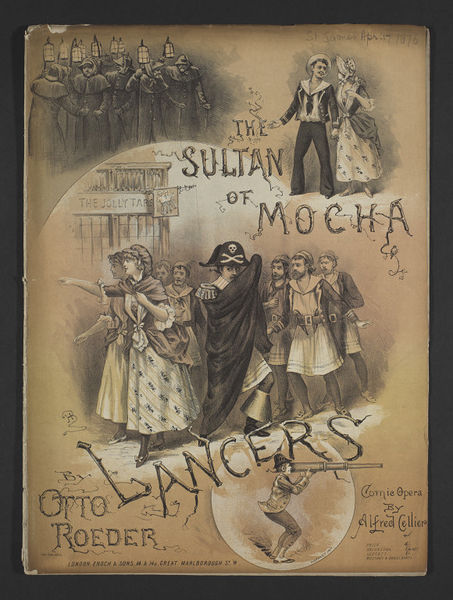
The Sultan of Mocha Lancers (1876)

ACT 1

- 1 – Here's Three Times Three – Chorus and Hornpipe
- 2 – Let the Lords of Legislation – Dolly
- 3 - The Letter (Ballad) - Dolly
- 4 - He is Returning - Dolly, Chorus
- 5 - The Telescope - Sneak
- 6 - How now, what's the row - Flint, Sneak and Dolly
- 7 - Two sad when I and Dolly parted - Peter
- 8 - The Island that dares to be free – Wooden Leg Chorus of Pensioners
- 9 - The Lass that waits for Peter - Peter
- 10 - Pipes and Grog - Peter
- 11 - Finale: We'll Sail Away with Peter

ACT II

- 12 - I Love the Ocean - Sneak
- 13 - Now tremble, you traitor - Peter, Sneak and Men
- 14 - O Caspian – Chorus of Slaves
- 15 - Woman's Rights - Dolly
- 16 - Sultan Am I -Sultan
- 17 - Come buy, come buy - Flint
- 18 - Sweet Hannah or Alice - Sultan and Dolly
- 19 - Finale: You'd better stay at Mocha

ACT III

- 20 - A Sailor's Love – Male chorus
- 21 - I Really Am So Sleepy - Peter
- 22 - Close, thou gentle sleep - Dolly
- 23 - From Chambers – Chorus of Odalisques
- 24 - It's very perplexing - Sultan, Isidora, Eureka
- 25 - Unrequited love - Sultan
- 26 - My boat is on the shore - Peter, Dolly
- 27 - Ballet music
- 28 - Finale: We are sober, we are ready. ... We'll sail away with Peter
