= Doris (opera) =

Comic opera by Alfred Cellier and B. C. Stephenson

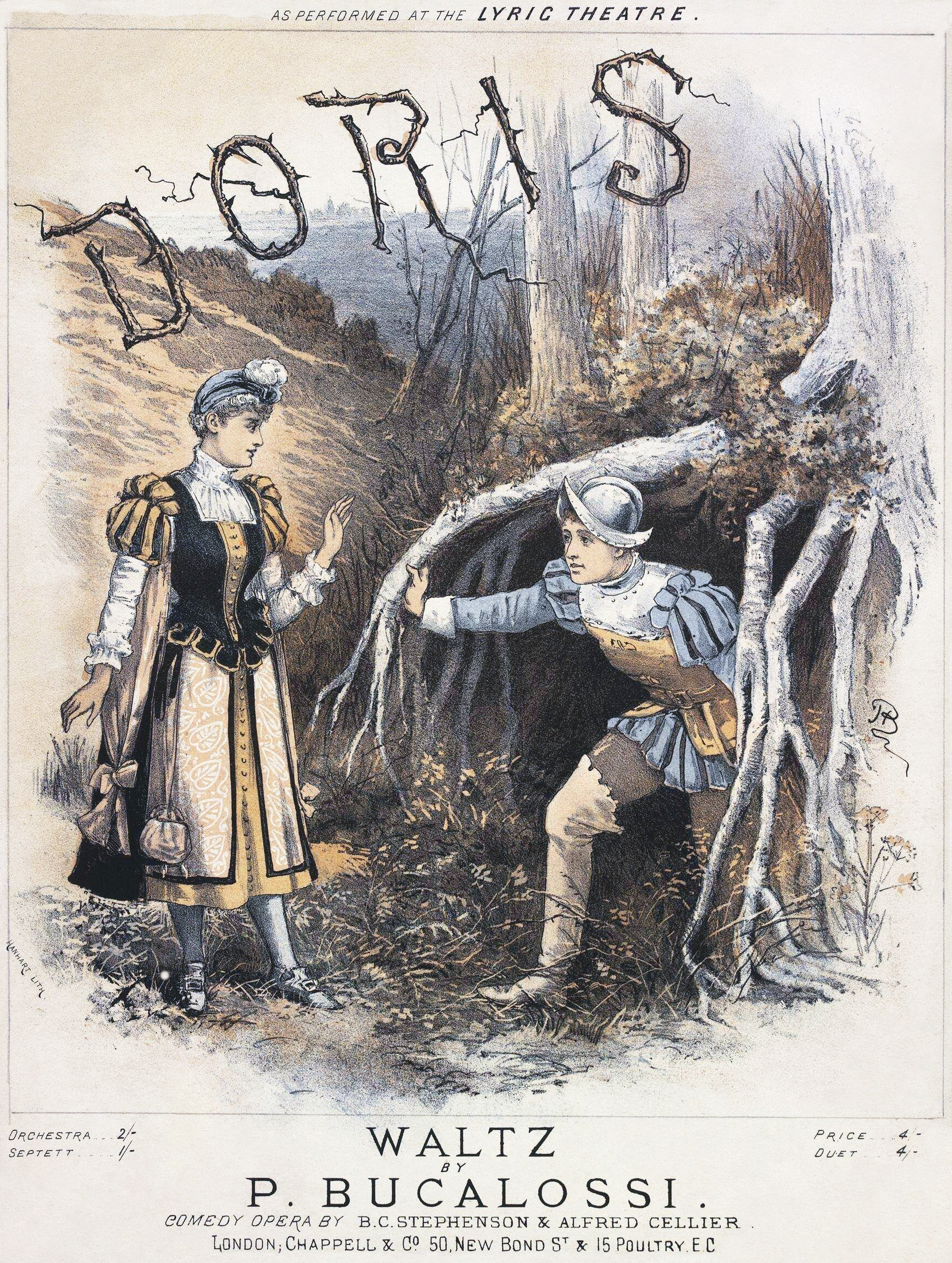
Sheet music cover of waltz based on tunes from the opera, showing the scene where Doris stumbles upon Sir Philip Carey's hiding spot

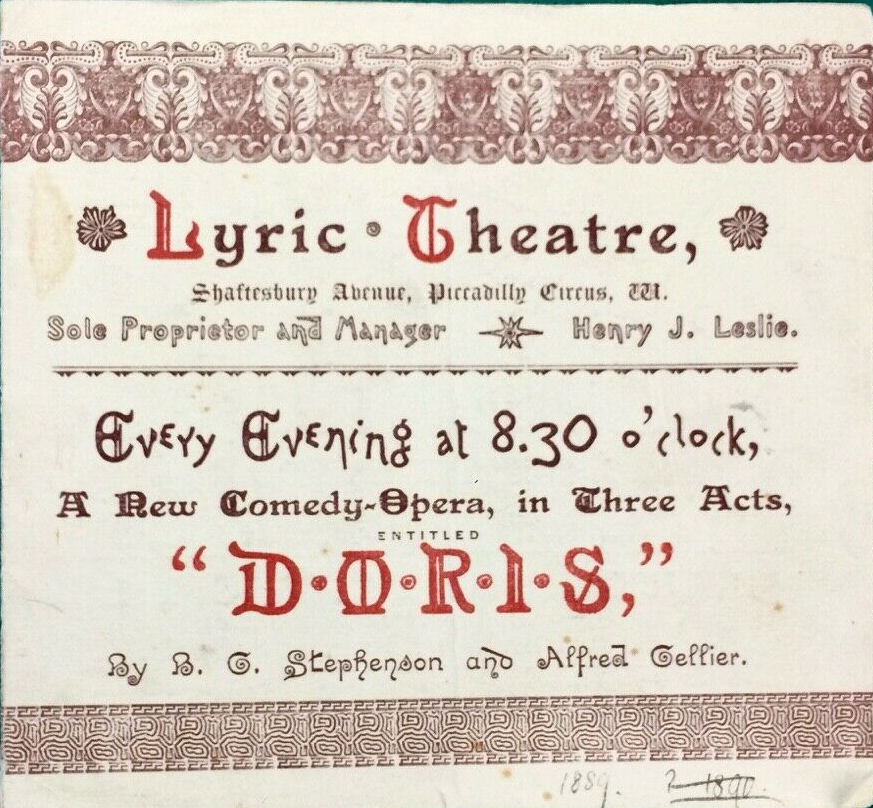
Cover to a programme of the original production of Doris (1889)

Doris is a "comedy opera" in three acts by Alfred Cellier, with a libretto by B. C. Stephenson. It is a revised version of Cellier's 1875 opera The Tower of London, produced by Henry J. Leslie as a follow-up to the duo's Dorothy (1886), which ran for a record-breaking 931 performances. Doris turned out to be only modestly successful.

It opened at the Lyric Theatre in London on 20 April 1889 and ran for 202 performances and was produced, like Dorothy, by Henry J. Leslie. It starred Arthur Williams, Ben Davies, Alice Barnett, Hayden Coffin, Furneaux Cook and John Le Hay. The title character was first played by opera and concert singer Annette Albu (1858–1927), a fine singer, but she was not a great comic actress and not considered pretty; after two months, with the show already flagging, Leslie replaced her with his star from Dorothy, Marie Tempest.

== Background ==
Following the success of their 1886 comic opera Dorothy, which ran for 931 performances, breaking the worldwide long-run record for musical theatre, librettist B. C. Stephenson and composer Alfred Cellier collaborated on Doris. Dorothy had solidified Cellier and Stephensons' reputation for blending melodic charm with lighthearted storytelling in the English comic opera tradition, although the pair made an unlikely team: Cellier bohemian and chattery, Stephenson fussy and money-conscious.

Doris originated as a revision of Cellier's earlier comic opera The Tower of London, which had premiered unsuccessfully in Manchester in 1875 with an anonymous libretto. Stephenson provided a new libretto to adapt and expand the existing music into a new three-act comedy opera. Cellier repurposed and refined selections from the 1875 score, while adding new material suited to contemporary tastes in light opera.

== Roles and original cast ==
The original cast featured several experienced performers from British comic opera scene, many of whom had appeared in works by Gilbert and Sullivan or Cellier's earlier successes, including Dorothy.

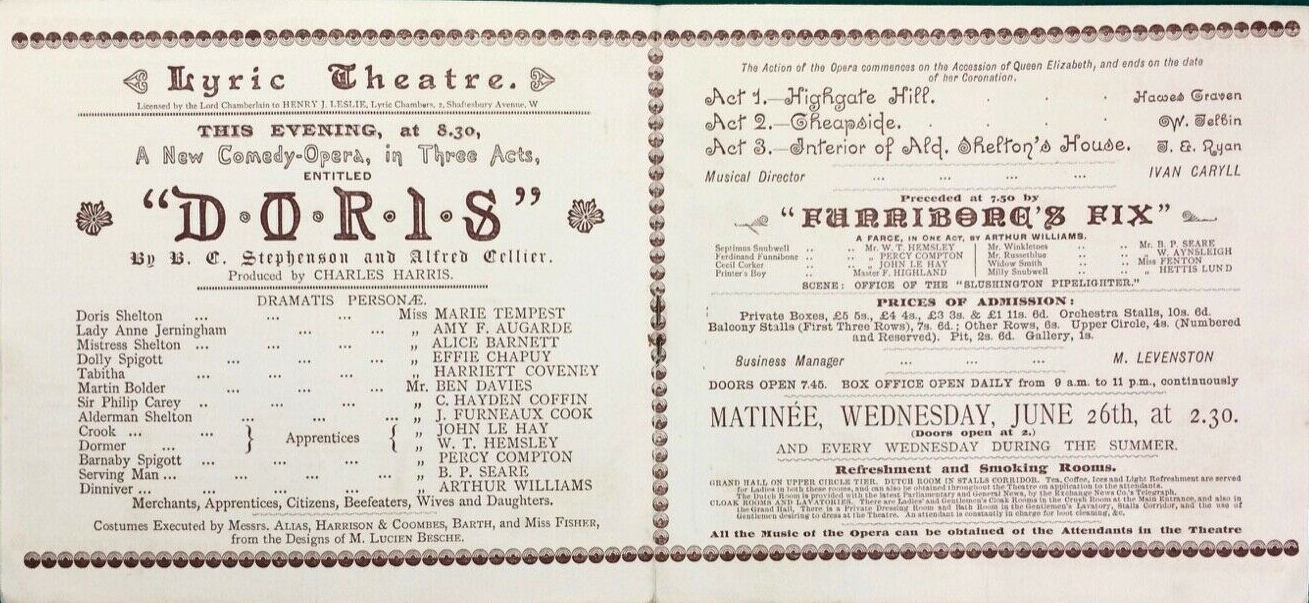
Cast list from a programme for Doris (1889)

- Doris Shelton – Annette Albu/Marie Tempest
- Lady Anne Jerningham – Amy Augarde
- Mistress Shelton – Alice Barnett
- Dolly Spigott – Effie Chapuy
- Martin Bolder – Ben Davies
- Sir Philip Carey – C. Hayden Coffin
- Alderman Shelton – J. Furneaux Cook
- Crook (Apprentice) – John Le Hay
- Dormer (Apprentice) – W. T. Hemsley
- Barnaby Spigott – Percy Compton
- Dinniver – Arthur Williams

== Synopsis ==
Place: London. Time: 16th century, reign of Queen Elizabeth I.

Act I: Highgate Hill, London

Sir Philip Carey is a fugitive, having been accused of participating in a plot against Queen Elizabeth I. He loves Anne Jerningham, one of the Queen's maids of honor. At a picnic given by her father, Alderman Shelton, Doris playfully runs away from Martin, her father's chief apprentice, and with whom she is in love. Attempting to hide in a hollow tree, she finds Sir Philip, already concealed there. She takes pity on him and convinces Martin and two friends to aid his escape. Dinniver, a comical wicked servant, hides behind a bush, overhears the plan and tells the Alderman about it. While the Alderman goes for the authorities, Dinniver is forced to exchange clothing with Philip, and so Dinniver is arrested in Philip's place. Philip escapes.

Act II: Cheapside

Philip is posing as an apprentice to the Alderman, but he is betrayed by Martin. After drawing the wrong conclusion from a letter, Martin has become jealous of Philip and Doris. When Martin realises that his jealousy is unfounded, he remorsefully dons the fugitive's original clothes and is arrested in his place. Sir Philip escapes again!

Act III: Interior of Alderman Shelton's House

Both lovers appear at a masque given at the Alderman's house. After a number of complications, the Queen pardons all political prisoners, including Philip, and all ends happily.

== Musical numbers ==
Act I - Highgate Hill

- No. 1 - Chorus - "A Gold! A Gold!"
- No. 2 - Scena - Crook and Dormer - "My arrow's nearest to the centre, see?"
- No. 3 - Shelton, Mrs. Shelton and Chorus - "I hereby do require..."
- No. 4 - Scena and Exit - "The cavalcade approaches..."
- No. 5 - Doris - "Love's race"
- No. 6 - Doris and Sir Philip - "How hardly fate with some us us doth deal..."
- No. 7 - Martin - "I've sought the brake and bracken..."
- No. 8 - Doris, Dame Shelton, Martin and Philip - "Who are you, may I ask..."
- No. 9 - Doris, Mrs. Shelton, Martin and Philip - "True Heart."
- No. 10 - Soli and Chorus - "Silently! Warily!"
- No. 11 - Finale - "Where is the traitor who threaten'd Her Majesty?"

Act II - Cheapside

- No. 12 - Introduction and The Alderman's Glee
- No. 13 - The Alderman's Song - Shelton - "What craven dares to talk of his home..."
- No. 14 - Soli and Chorus - "Go to bed."
- No. 15 - Dinnever - "What has become of the door?"
- No. 16 - Anne Jerningham - "Sir Philip's Farewell."
- No. 17 - Sir Philip - "Honour bids me speed away..."
- No. 18 - Recitative and Duet - Anne and Sir Philip - "The Parting."
- No. 19 - Cavatina - Doris - "Learn to wait."
- No. 20 - Soli and Chorus - "What do you lack, Ladies?"
- No. 21 - Chorus of Beefeaters - "In many climes..."
- No. 22 - Finale - "Ye Citizens of London."

Act III - Interior of Alderman Shelton's House

- No. 23 - Introduction and Chorus - "Who are you? What are you..."
- No. 24 - Doris and Martin - "If I am dreaming..."
- No. 25 - Doris, Anne, Martin, Sir Philip and Shelton - "Fare thee well."
- No. 26 - Entrance of the Masquers and Chorus - "Far from eastern seas..."
- Nos. 27 and 28 - Recit. and Song - Doris and Martin - "I thank you for your gifts..." and "All the wealth..."
- No. 29 - Finale - "She will, she won't..."

== Reception and legacy ==
Upon its premiere, Doris elicited mixed critical responses, with praise often centered on Alfred Cellier's melodic invention despite reservations about the libretto. The New York Times stated:

Musically considered, the new comic opera is an English classic. ... The composer does not descend at any time from his ideal plane. There is [no] sacrifice of artistic form at any point to please the popular ear. All the numbers are charming, and several of them ... are simply gems. ... The libretto ... is about as ingeniously bad a bit of construction as could be conceived. ... The comic opportunities are few and very conventional; consequently ... the opera is neither funny nor interesting.

Another critic concluded, "The libretto of Doris is so feeble that I misdoubt even Cellier's music, the splendid mounting of the piece, and the interesting Elizabethan processions pulling it through. What judicious compression and unscrupulous 'gagging' may accomplish one cannot, of course, venture to prophesy. I understood that at the end of Dorothy's run very little if any of the original dialogue remained. It had been improved out of recognition. Still, both Dorothy and Falka rejoiced in plain straightforward stories everyone could understand. The difficulty is to make head or tail of Doris."

In long-term evaluations, Doris has been regarded as inferior to Dorothy, with its shorter run and lesser revival history reflecting a perception of it as a transitional piece in English comic opera. Cellier's next work, The Mountebanks (1892) with a libretto by W. S. Gilbert, was completed after the composer's death by Ivan Caryll and was similarly only modestly successful. Modern scholarship views Doris as part of Cellier's contributions to British light opera, though the work is rarely revived today.

A piano-vocal score, arranged from the full score by Ivan Caryll, was published by Chappell & Company shortly after the premiere, facilitating amateur performances and study of the work. No professional revivals of Doris are documented after the initial production period, though the vocal score remains accessible through digital archives and libraries.
