= John Le Hay =

English singer and actor (1854–1926)

Le Hay as Coquenard in Véronique, 1905

John Le Hay was the stage name of John Mackway Healy (25 March 1854 – 2 November 1926), an English singer and actor known for his portrayal of the comic baritone roles in the Savoy Operas. He also appeared in non-musical plays, adaptations of French comic operas and opérettes, and in Edwardian musical comedy, usually in comic roles, though sometimes in more serious character parts. As a skilled ventriloquist he appeared before royalty, and periodically he presented his own one-man entertainment during his half-century long stage career.

== Life and career ==
=== Early years ===
Le Hay was born in Bethnal Green, London, although later he would say that he had been born in Ireland. His parents were John Healy (1820–1901) and his wife Sophia Elizabeth Mackway (1823– 1886), both Londoners. He had a younger brother, Joseph (1858–1931). His father worked as a manager in a pawnshop, where Le Hay began his working life.

As a young actor he made his first stage appearance at the King's Cross Theatre in London and then travelled with a minstrel troupe, where he developed his gift for ventriloquism. He was engaged in 1879 at the Royalty Theatre, London, where he worked as an understudy and appeared in the chorus of a revival of Stephenson and Sullivan's The Zoo. Later that year he joined the D'Oyly Carte Opera Company, serving in the chorus on tour. In July 1879, he survived a boating accident on the River Avon at Bathampton in which two other members of the touring company drowned. He appeared in the single copyright performance of The Pirates of Penzance in Paignton on 30 December 1879, as James, a role that was included in the libretto only for that performance. During 1880 and 1881, he continued in the chorus and also appeared as Mr. Liverby in In the Sulks, and Benjamin Walker in Four by Honours, curtain-raisers that accompanied H.M.S. Pinafore.

Le Hay (right) as Sir Guy of Gisborne in Maid Marian (1891), with Harry Monkhouse as Sir Tristram Testy (left) and Harry Parker as Friar Tuck

Le Hay as Phantis, with W. H. Denny as Scaphio, in Utopia, Limited, 1893

Le Hay married Marian Lowry (1854–1940), also a member of the D'Oyly Carte company, who performed under the stage name of Marian May for about a decade. The couple had three daughters and a son; two of these, Norah Sophia (1884–1970) and Millicent Marian Rylance (1888–1966), became actresses. From 1881 to 1883, Le Hay served as the principal comedian with a D'Oyly Carte touring company, playing J. W. Wells in The Sorcerer, Sir Joseph Porter in H.M.S. Pinafore, and Major General Stanley in Pirates. He also appeared briefly in the tenor role of Ralph Rackstraw in Pinafore and filled in as Frederic in Pirates on one occasion. The Western Mail praised his performance in H.M.S. Pinafore:

Mr John Le Hay's Sir Joseph Porter is a most happy piece of acting. The "First Lord of the Admiralty" … is presented in all his pomposity and officialdom, without the character being rendered either too outrageously absurd or violently ludicrous. Mr Le Hay is so natural that one feels inclined to believe that he is really saturated with official snobbishness and upstart arrogance; while his singing is capital, and his clear enunciation especially commendable.

Le Hay left the D'Oyly Carte company in 1884; he toured as Dick in Vice-Versa and Coombes in the Victorian burlesque Silver Guilt. and played in pantomime, in low comedies with Cooper Cole's Strand Company, and, for a year, was a member of the company headed by Edward Terry at the Gaiety Theatre in London. In 1886 he created the part of Tom Strutt in Alfred Cellier's comic opera Dorothy, and played it throughout its run of 931 performances, which ended on 6 April 1889. A fortnight later he created the role of Crook in Cellier's next opera, Doris. Over the following years, among other roles, he created or played leading roles in various other West End musicals and operettas: Private Smith in The Red Hussar (1889) Jacob in The Black Rover (1890), a revival of the comic opera Les cloches de Corneville alongside Leonora Braham (1890), and Prince Bulbo in Augustus Harris's production of a musical adaptation of The Rose and the Ring (1890–1891).

In 1891 Le Hay played Sir Guy of Gisborne in Maid Marian by Harry B. Smith and Reginald De Koven, after which he rejoined D'Oyly Carte for a year. Initially he was a member of a touring company, playing Punka, Rajah of Chutneypore, in The Nautch Girl. In November Richard D'Oyly Carte brought him to London to play Master Guillot in the British premiere of Messager's The Basoche at the Royal English Opera House; The Era judged it his best performance to date. When The Basoche closed in early 1892 Le Hay rejoined the Nautch Girl company, playing Punka for the remainder of the tour.

Later in 1892 Le Hay played Sacrovir in The Wedding Eve, an adaptation of an opérette by Frédéric Toulmouche, with Decima Moore as its leading lady, after which he recreated his original role of Tom Strutt in a revival of Dorothy. In 1893 he was in The Black Domino, a melodrama starring Mrs. Patrick Campbell, in which Le Hay played a character role, and Arthur Williams provided the principal comic relief. The piece was preceded by a curtain-raiser, billed as an "Entertainment", given by Le Hay. He rejoined D'Oyly Carte for the last time in late 1893, creating the part of Phantis in Utopia, Limited at the Savoy Theatre, and playing it until the end of the run in June 1894.

=== Later years ===
Later in 1894 Le Hay appeared with Lillian Russell in The Queen of Brilliants, and then as Mats Munck in Gilbert and Carr's comic opera His Excellency. He later played the same part in New York, with a George Edwardes touring company. In 1896, he played Alexander McGregor in the musical comedy My Girl, an Edwardes production written by James T. Tanner, Carr and Adrian Ross, in a West End cast that also included Ellaline Terriss, Willie Warde and Connie Ediss. In September 1897 Le Hay starred with Florence St. John in a new production of Offenbach's La Périchole at the Garrick Theatre. Both performers received excellent notices: The Era described her performance as "a complete triumph", and his as "inimitable"; the critic in The Pall Mall Gazette wrote, "Mr John Le Hay as the Viceroy was simply admirable. Not only have we not seen this part better rendered, but we can hardly imagine it so. … pure comedy".

Le Hay appeared in New York as Hassan in Hood and Sullivan's The Rose of Persia (1900, opposite Ruth Vincent as the Sultana), and as Coquenard in the American premiere of Messager's Véronique (1905). He toured America three times and South Africa once. His talents as a ventriloquist were in demand, and he appeared in that capacity on several occasions before King Edward VII at Buckingham Palace and Sandringham. From time to time Le Hay appeared solo or with his own small company in sketches at music halls. One of his later theatrical parts was in Thomas Hardy's Tess of the d'Urbervilles in 1925, with Gwen Ffrangcon-Davies in the title role. The reviewer in Punch wrote, "Mr John Le Hay gave us a superb little study of an old countryman which richly deserved the enthusiastic applause that rewarded it".

On 1 November 1926 Le Hay was struck by a car on his way home from the Lyceum Theatre in London, where he had been appearing as Florent, the butler, in The Padre. He died the next day at the age of 77. He was survived by his wife, Marian May, a former D'Oyly Carte performer.

== Sources ==
- Gänzl, Kurt; Andrew Lamb (1988). Gänzl's Book of the Musical Theatre. London: The Bodley Head. OCLC 424037659.
- Hollingshead, John (1903). Good Old Gaiety: An Historiette & Remembrance. London: Gaiety Theatre Company. OCLC 1056054978.
- Parker, John, ed. (1925). Who's Who in the Theatre (fifth ed.). London: Sir Isaac Pitman and Sons. OCLC 10013159.
- Rollins, Cyril; R. John Witts (1962). The D'Oyly Carte Opera Company in Gilbert and Sullivan Operas: A Record of Productions, 1875–1961. London: Michael Joseph. OCLC 504581419.
