= Topsyturveydom =

Operetta by W. S. Gilbert and Alfred Cellier

Like many of Gilbert's plays,
Topsyturveydom is based on one of
Gilbert's Bab Ballads, quoted below.

MY DREAM

The other night, from cares exempt,
I slept—and what d'you think I dreamt?
I dreamt that somehow I had come
To dwell in Topsy-Turveydom!—

Where vice is virtue—virtue, vice:
Where nice is nasty—nasty, nice:
Where right is wrong and wrong is right—
Where white is black and black is white.

Where babies, much to their surprise,
Are born astonishingly wise;
With every Science on their lips,
And Art at all their fingertips.

For, as their nurses dandle them,
They crow binomial theorem,
With views (it seems absurd to us)
On differential calculus.

But though a babe, as I have said,
Is born with learning in his head,
He must forget it, if he can,
Before he calls himself a man.

For that which we call folly here,
Is wisdom in that favoured sphere;
The wisdom we so highly prise
Is blatant folly in their eyes.

A boy, if he would push his way,
Must learn some nonsense every day;
And cut, to carry out this view,
His wisdom teeth and wisdom too.

Historians burn their midnight oils,
Intent on giant-killers' toils;
And sages close their aged eyes
To other sages' lullabies.

Our magistrates, in duty bound,
Commit all robbers who are found;
But there the beaks (so people said)
Commit all robberies instead.

Our judges, pure and wise in tone,
Know crime from theory alone,
And glean the motives of a thief
From books and popular belief.

But there, a judge who wants to prime
His mind with true ideas of crime,
Derives them from the common sense
Of practical experience.

Policemen march all folks away
Who practice virtue every day—
Of course, I m—ean to say, you know,
What we call virtue here below.

For only scoundrels dare to do
What we consider just and true,
And only good men do, in fact,
What we should think a dirty act.

But strangest of these social twirls,
The girls are boys—the boys are girls!
The men are women, too—but then
Per contra, women all are men.

To one who to tradition clings
This seems an awkward state of things,
But if to think it out you try,
It doesn't really signify.

With them, as surely as can be,
A sailor should be sick at sea,
And not a passenger may sail
Who cannot smoke right through a gale.

A soldier (save by rarest luck)
Is always shot for showing pluck—
That is, if others can be found
With pluck enough to fire a round.

"How strange," I said to one I saw,
"You quite upset our every law.
However can you get along
So systematically wrong?"

"Dear me," my mad informant said,
"Have you no eyes within your head?
You sneer when you your hat should doff:
Why, we begin where you leave off!

"Your wisest men are very far
Less learned than our babies are!"
I muse awhile—and then, oh me!
I framed this brilliant repartee:

Although your babes are wiser far
Than our most valued sages are,
Your sages, with their toys and cots,
Are duller than our idiots!"

But this remark, I grieve to state,
Came just a little bit too late;
For as I framed it in my head,
I woke and found myself in bed.

Still I could wish that, 'stead of here,
My lot were in that favoured sphere!—
Where greatest fools bear off the bell
I ought to do extremely well.

Topsyturveydom (sometimes spelled Topsyturvydom or Topseyturveydom) is a one-act operetta by W. S. Gilbert with music by Alfred Cellier. Styled "an entirely original musical extravaganza", it is based on one of Gilbert's Bab Ballads, "My Dream". It opened on 21 March 1874 at the Criterion Theatre in London and ran until 17 April, for about 25 performances. This was the first work shown at the newly built Criterion, and it was played together with An American Lady, written and performed by Gilbert's friend, the dramatist and Fun magazine founder, Henry J. Byron. The musical score to Topsyturveydom does not survive, but amateur productions in recent decades have used newly composed scores or performed the work as a non-musical play.

W. S. Gilbert illustration for the Bab Ballad "My Dream", quoted to the right

Advertisements for the work spelled the title "Topsyturveydom", whereas the license copy of the libretto, filed with the Lord Chamberlain's office, and now held in the British Library, spells it "Topsyturvydom", and the opening night programme had "Topseyturveydom". Topsyturveydom is set in a quasi-utopia (reminiscent of Gilbert's earlier Happy Arcadia (1872), or even Jonathan Swift's Gulliver's Travels), where things are the opposite of the norm. Party politics is lampooned, much as it would be two decades later in Gilbert and Sullivan's Utopia, Limited. As in that work, the king is a "detested" monarch. Gilbert also renews the idea of party politics working in a backwards way in Iolanthe, where the House of Lords is threatened with obsolescence by having its members selected by competitive examination.

== Background ==
1874 was a busy year for both Gilbert and Cellier. Gilbert illustrated The Piccadilly Annual; supervised a revival of Pygmalion and Galatea; and, in addition to Topsyturveydom, wrote Charity, about the redemption of a fallen woman; Rosencrantz and Guildenstern, a parody of Hamlet; a dramatisation of Ought We to Visit Her? (a novel by Annie Edwardes), an adaptation from the French, Committed for Trial, another adaptation from the French called The Blue-Legged Lady; and a play, Sweethearts. He also wrote a Bab-illustrated story called "The Story of a Twelfth Cake" for the Graphic Christmas number. Cellier produced his most successful early work, a full-length comic opera called The Sultan of Mocha. Gilbert was either too busy to see his own show, or else, disappointed by its lack of success with audiences, he had put it out of his mind. In a letter to T. Edgar Pemberton, author of the 1903 book on the Criterion Theatre, Gilbert wrote:

I am sorry to say that in my mind is an absolute blank to the opening of The Criterion. I never saw Topseyturveydom. If you happen to have a copy of it and could lend it to me for a few hours it might suggest some reminiscences: as it is I don't even know what the piece was about!

The Athenaeum called the piece "clever, but rather remote... an exercise rather than an amusement."

From the mid-1860s through the early 1870s, W. S. Gilbert was extremely productive, writing a large quantity of comic verse, theatre reviews and other journalistic pieces, short stories, and dozens of plays and comic operas. His dramatic writing during this time was evolving from his early musical burlesques. Some of his work during this period exhibited a more restrained style, exemplified by a series of successful "fairy comedies", such as The Palace of Truth (1870). At the same time, he was developing his unique style of absurdist humour, described as "Topsy-Turvy", made up of "a combination of wit, irony, topsyturvydom, parody, observation, theatrical technique, and profound intelligence". Topsyturveydom dates from the end of this period, during which Gilbert tried a variety of different styles and was working towards the mature comic style of his later work, including the famous series of Gilbert and Sullivan operas.

== Roles ==
- Mr. Satis (M.P. For Ballotville) – J. Clarke
- King Patatra (Of Topsyturveydom) – F. Dewar
- Crapolee (His Prime Minister) – E. W. Garden
- Wilkins (A Footman) – Mr. Smith
- Quop – Miss Montgomery
- Crambo – Miss C. Brabant
- Serape (The King's Mother) – Miss Hughes (Mrs. Gaston Murray)
- Tipto (The King's Grandmother) (soprano) – Fanny Holland
- Tiddyickle (The King's Great-Grandmother) – Dolly Wood
- Topsyturvey Courtiers, Etc.

Note: although the libretto refers to Serape and Tipto as the Queen's mother and grandmother, they are actually the King's mother and grandmother. However, this may be another Topsyturvey element. Also, Tiddyickle is a baby, and so the stage name "Dolly Wood" may be a pun on 'wooden doll'.

== Synopsis ==
Gilbert illustration of the Bab Ballad

=== Scene 1: Home of Satis ===
The Prime Minister of Topsyturveydom arrives at the home of old Satis, a member of parliament. He describes his country as a land "where everything is conducted on principles the very reverse of those" in England. The people are born elderly and grow younger until they become infants. They start out wise and gradually forget everything, until at last their minds are a perfect blank. Folly is honoured, wisdom is despised, true beauty consists in making yourself ugly, and people walk on the ceiling with their heads on the floor. He has been comparing customs in the two countries and invites Satis to accompany him to Topsyturveydom. Satis readily agrees.

=== Scene 2: King's reception room in Topsyturvydom ===
From inside the King's reception room in Topsyturvydom, an inverted landscape is seen through the window. A chandelier sprouts from the middle of the floor, and chairs and tables hang upside-down. A ridiculous celebration has been planned, for the king is coming of age (having been born at 80, he is now to 59). The king is filled with pleasure when his courtiers express their hatred for him. They call him an ugly donkey and a detested monarch, which delights him. His mother comes to see him and says:

My son! I have always been a careless and injudicious mother to you, and I am about to propose a most imprudent step. You are now of age, and it's high time you began to think of taking a wife. Several old and hideous princesses who are enormously poor have proposed for your hand, and I think it high time you began to think of making one of them unhappy.

The king protests that he wants to "kick up his heels" for a few more years, and his mother replies, "Your sound common sense is simply disgusting." The king's grandmother, Tipto, who is so old that she is gaining "full possession of all her faculties" appears, and the king asks her to put down her childish science books, or he shall have to commit her to a "sane house". Tipto sings, "I always forget that I mustn't remember, But never remember I ought to forget."

Gilbert illustration of the Bab Ballad

Crapolee and Satis enter the reception room just as the courtiers sing the national anthem to the king, "Fiends dissect our Royal Master". They groan and hiss at him because they love him so. Satis says that he would like to see a session of Parliament. He learns that the legislators are all wealthy donkeys and that the seats in Parliament are bought and paid for. Satis states that in England, "Members are elected because they represent most faithfully the opinions of their constituents." The king's mother and grandmother enter holding a baby (the king's great-grandmother). Thinking that Satis looks 74, ask him where his nurse is. He replies that he's not so old at all, only 52. He tells the king's mother that she is pretty, and she leaves in a huff.

Satis notes that the king's grandmother, Tipto, is beautiful, and says that he likes beautiful girls. Tipto admits that she is beautiful and says that she is not insulted. But, she wonders, how can an ugly old fellow like Satis care to talk to a beautiful young girl like her? Tipto is Satis proposes marriage to her. They can go to England and grow older, then come back and grow younger. Tipto says, "But we love one another.... People in this country only marry those they hate, and wretchedness is the invariable result... but I'm such a strange girl that I prefer happiness... but the idea of marriage – oh, it's too dreadful." She sings to him about the horrors of marriage.

The king returns and says that Satis has insulted his mother. Satis admits it. The king is overjoyed and offers him his mother as a bride. Satis declares that he loves the king's grandmother. The king is very angry and says "prepare to die". But the prime minister suggests a more hideous punishment: "He loves your grandmother and your grandmother loves him – let him marry her and spend a lifetime of uninterrupted bliss!" The king dispenses the horrible punishment: "Take her, and may a grandson's heartfelt blessing pursue you wherever you go!"

== Musical numbers ==
1. Duet (Crapolee and Satis) – "True beauty we hate and despise"
2. Song (King) – "I do not prize a pauper's lot"
3. Ballad (Tipto) – "Oh, sad is her state and beyond all apologies"
4. Chorus – "Fiends dissect our Royal Master"
5. Ballad (Tipto) – "Grows the little brook in going"
6. Finale – "Monster, let this thought arrest you"
