= Prince's Theatre, Manchester =

Coordinates: 53°28′38″N 2°14′37″W

Prince's Theatre
- Interactive map of Prince's Theatre
- Address: Oxford Street; Manchester; England
- Capacity: 1,590, increased to 1,890 in 1869

Construction
- Opened: 1864
- Closed: 1940
- Architect: Edward Salomons

The Prince's Theatre in Oxford Street, Manchester, England, was built at a cost of £20,000 in 1864. Under the artistic and managerial leadership of Charles Calvert, "Manchester's most celebrated actor-manager", it soon became a great popular success. The theatre's first production, Shakespeare's The Tempest, took place on 15 October 1864; Calvert himself played Prospero and his wife took the role of Miranda. The Times newspaper of 18 October reported that the 1,590-seat theatre "was exceedingly well filled", and declared the evening "a brilliant success". The theatre subsequently became synonymous with Calvert's elaborate and historically accurate Shakespearian productions.

The theatre's interior was extensively rebuilt by Alfred Darbyshire in 1869. The work included the addition of 300 seats, and featured a frieze over the proscenium painted by Henry Stacy Marks showing Shakespeare flanked by muses and his principal characters. The Prince's was the first theatre to introduce tip-up seats and "early doors" tickets, which for a premium allowed patrons to enter the theatre early, to avoid the usual opening-time crush. In 1874 the theatre was the venue for the premiere of Alfred Cellier's comic opera The Sultan of Mocha.

The years after the First World War saw a decline in the theatre's fortunes, and by the 1930s the increasing competition from cinema was threatening its viability. The final performance took place in April 1940, after which the building was sold to the ABC cinema company, who intended to replace it with a large cinema complex. Although the theatre was demolished shortly afterwards, the intervention of the Second World War meant that the cinema was never built; the site is now occupied by Peter House, a large office complex completed in 1958.
