= B. C. Stephenson =

English dramatist, lyricist and librettist (1839–1906)

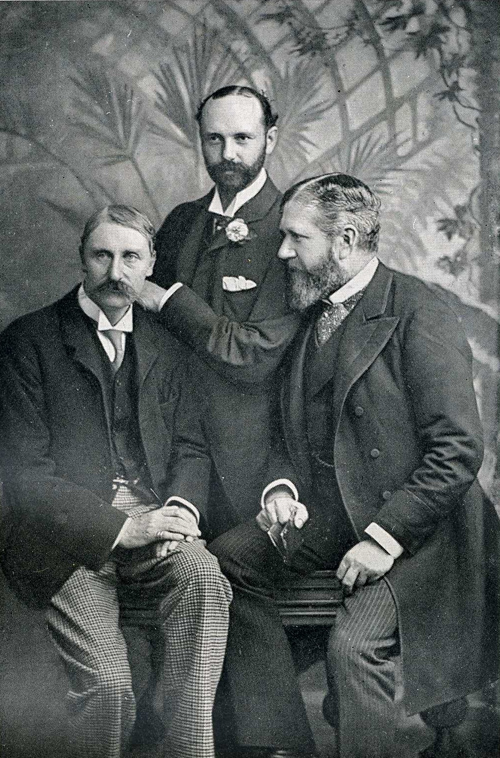
Alfred Cellier, H. J. Leslie and Stephenson, creators of Dorothy

Benjamin Charles Stephenson or B. C. Stephenson (1839 – 22 January 1906) was an English dramatist, lyricist and librettist. After beginning a career in the civil service, he started to write for the theatre, using the pen name "Bolton Rowe". He was author or co-author of several long-running shows of the Victorian theatre. His biggest hit was the comic opera Dorothy, which set records for the length of its original run.

His writing collaborators included Clement Scott and Brandon Thomas, and composers with whom he worked included Frederic Clay, Alfred Cellier and Arthur Sullivan with whom he wrote The Zoo, which continues to be revived today.

== Life and career ==
=== Early years ===
Stephenson, the son of Sir William Henry Stephenson, came from a family with a history of public service, both civil and military. His grandfather, also named Benjamin Charles Stephenson, was a major-general and later one of the Commissioners of Woods and Forests. Stephenson's father became a civil servant, rising to become chairman of the Board of Inland Revenue. The young Stephenson was commissioned into the Middlesex Militia and later entered the civil service.

While working as a civil servant, Stephenson began writing theatrical pieces. His grandfather, General B. C. Stephenson, had lived and died at a house in Bolton Row, Mayfair, and the young Stephenson adopted "Bolton Rowe" as his pen name. Stephenson's first works were collaborations with the composer Frederic Clay in three pieces played by amateurs, The Pirate's Isle, Out of Sight and The Bold Recruit (1868). The last of these was repeated at a benefit, produced by Thomas German Reed, at the Gallery of Illustration in 1870 as a companion piece to Clay and W.S. Gilbert's Ages Ago. Stephenson's first professional success came at the same venue, two years later, with a short operetta, written with the composer Alfred Cellier, Charity Begins at Home. The piece was in the company's repertory for most of 1872, and was played more than 200 times.

Stephenson was still using the pseudonym "Bolton Rowe" when he wrote the libretto for Arthur Sullivan's one-act comic opera The Zoo in 1875. This work is still played today with some frequency. He then began a writing partnership with Clement Scott, who adopted the matching pen name, "Saville Rowe" (after Savile Row, another Mayfair street). Together, for the Bancrofts at the Prince of Wales's Theatre, they wrote English versions of Victorien Sardou's plays, Nos intimes (as Peril) and Dora (1878 as Diplomacy). The latter was described by the theatrical paper The Era as "the great dramatic hit of the season". It also played with success at Wallack's Theatre in New York. Stephenson and Scott wrote an English version of Halévy and Meilhac's libretto for Lecocq's operette, Le Petit Duc. Their adaptation so pleased the composer that he volunteered to write some new music for the English production.

=== West End and Broadway success ===
In 1880, Stephenson's work again featured in New York. The reopened Broadway Opera House was inaugurated with a double bill of Ages Ago and Charity Begins at Home. Stephenson also supplied the libretto for a three-act grand opera version of Longfellow's The Masque of Pandora, composed by Alfred Cellier, and presented in Boston in 1881. The next year in London, Stephenson collaborated with Brandon Thomas on a "new and critical comedy", Comrades, for the Court Theatre, with a cast including Arthur Cecil, D. G. Boucicault and Marion Terry. Writing under his real name for the first time, Stephenson had a great success in 1882–83 with his play Impulse, based on La Maison du mari by Xavier de Montépin, which opened in December 1882 and ran through most of the next year. In 1886, he adapted Der Probepfeil by Oscar Blumenthal as A Woman of the World, which was staged at the Haymarket Theatre, starring Herbert Beerbohm Tree and Helen Barry.

In 1886 Stephenson had his greatest success. He and Cellier wrote the comic opera Dorothy. The piece opened at the Gaiety Theatre on 25 September 1886, receiving lukewarm notices. Much of Cellier's score was reused material from an earlier failure, and neither the music nor the libretto attracted critical praise. The Times wrote, "Gentility reigns supreme, and with it unfortunately also a good deal of the refined feebleness and the ineptitude which are the defects of that quality." Stephenson and Cellier revised the work, and it transferred in December to the Prince of Wales Theatre with new stars, including Marie Tempest. Dorothy became a great success at the box office and transferred in 1888 to the Lyric Theatre, where it ran until 1889. Its initial run of a total of 931 performances was the longest of any piece of musical theatre up to that time. Some critics reconsidered their earlier condemnation, the work became regarded as a classic Victorian piece, and the initially despised plot was traced seriously back to the Restoration playwrights David Garrick and Aphra Behn, and to Oliver Goldsmith and even Shakespeare. Stephenson and Cellier later collaborated on another comic opera, Doris (1888), which, without rivalling Dorothy, had a good run of more than 200 performances.

Stephenson's later work in musical theatre was less successful. For the Carl Rosa Opera Company he rewrote the libretto for The Golden Web, an opera bouffe by the composer Arthur Thomas, which was first heard in 1893. In spite of some positive critical attention, interest in the piece was short-lived. The same year, two short operettas with music by Edward Jakobowski, The Improvisatore and A Venetian Singer, made little impact. The Ranch, a musical farce with music by Edward Solomon, failed to find a theatre to stage it. A libretto for Charles Villiers Stanford, Christopher Patch, The Barber of Bath, was set by Stanford but has never been performed. A libretto for Sir Alexander Mackenzie remained, as McKenzie put it in 1898, "still in my desk".

=== Later years ===
In the non-musical theatre, Stephenson continued to prosper. By the 1890s he was sufficiently well known that his name as author of a play lent cachet. In 1892 one British newspaper protested that a new play, advertised as the work of Stephenson and Augustus Harris, was in fact the work of less-known writers. In the same year, Stephenson produced one of his more enduring works, Faithful James, a one act comedy. It supplanted Gilbert's Rosencrantz and Guildenstern in a triple bill running at the Court Theatre. The cast included Weedon Grossmith, Brandon Thomas, Ellaline Terriss and Sybil Grey. Among later revivals of the play was one in 1907 with Rutland Barrington in the title role of the bumbling butler. In 1894, Stephenson co-wrote a melodrama with Haddon Chambers, The Fatal Card, which was well received. Asked how he and his collaborator worked together, he said, "We divide the labour. I write all the vowels and Mr Chambers all the consonants."

Among revivals of Stephenson's works, during his life and after, were Dorothy (on several occasions, notably in 1908, when the critic of The Times called it "one of the most tuneful, most charming, and most shapely of English comic operas") and Diplomacy, which was given in command performances for Queen Victoria in 1893 and George V in 1914, and was revived again in 1924, starring Gladys Cooper.

Stephenson died in Taplow, Berkshire, at the age of 66.
