= Alfred Cellier =

19th-century English composer and conductor

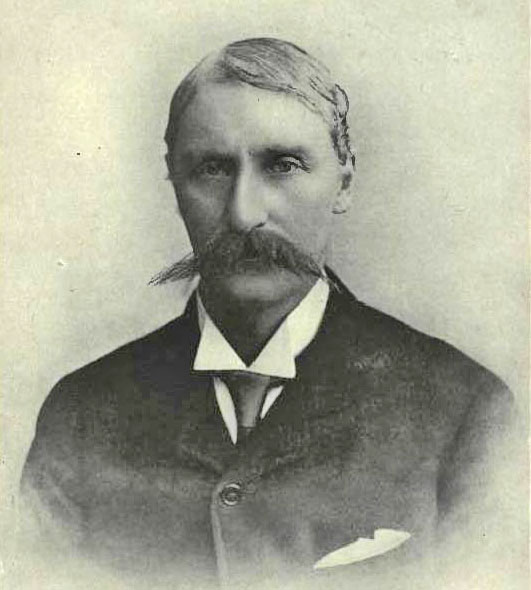
Cellier, c. 1880s

Alfred Cellier (1 December 1844 – 28 December 1891) was an English composer, orchestrator and conductor.

In addition to conducting and music directing the original productions of several of the most famous Gilbert and Sullivan works and writing the overtures to some of them, Cellier conducted at many theatres in London, New York and on tour in Britain, America and Australia. He composed over a dozen operas and other works for the theatre, as well as for orchestra, but his 1886 comic opera, Dorothy, was by far his most successful work. It became the longest-running piece of musical theatre in the nineteenth century.

== Biography ==
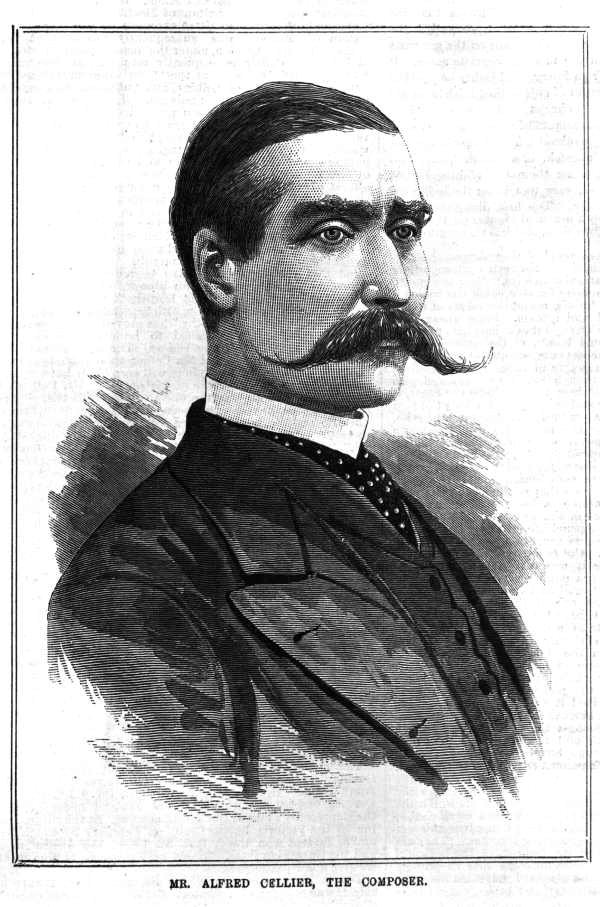
Woodblock engraving of Cellier, 1887

Cellier was born in South Hackney, London, the second child and eldest son of Arsène Cellier, a language teacher from France, and his wife Mary Ann Peterine, formerly Peacock, née Thomsett. He was educated at the grammar school in Hackney. In the 1850s he was a chorister at the Chapel Royal, St. James's, under the Rev. Thomas Helmore, where Arthur Sullivan was one of his schoolmates. Cellier later married Harriet Emily. Cellier's brother, François, also became a conductor.

=== Early career ===
Cellier's first appointments were as organist at All Saints' Church, Blackheath and as conductor of the Belfast Philharmonic Society (both in 1862). In 1866 he succeeded Dr. Chipp as organist and director of the Ulster Hall concerts, Belfast, at the same time acting as conductor of the Belfast Philharmonic Society. In 1868 he returned to London as organist of St Alban's Church, Holborn. In January 1871, Cellier became the first conductor and music director at the Royal Court Theatre in London. From 1871 to 1875 he was conductor and musical director at the Prince's Theatre in Manchester.

During this period he composed many comic operas and operettas, the first of which was Charity Begins at Home (1872 at the Gallery of Illustration), with the librettist B. C. Stephenson. (Note: Stephenson wrote under the pen name "Bolton Rowe".) The piece was a success and played more than 200 times. A reviewer in the London and Provincial Entr'Acte wrote that the music "is unexpectedly apropos and pretty ... and we have no hesitation in saying that Mr. Alfred Cellier's melodies will live even after the long life [of the production] shall have come to an end." He achieved a favourable outcome with The Sultan of Mocha, produced at Prince's Theatre, Manchester, in 1874 and revived in London in 1876 and 1887 (with a new libretto) and in New York in 1880, among others. Most of his early works for the theatre, including Dora's Dream (1873), Topsyturveydom (1874, with a libretto by W. S. Gilbert), The Tower of London (1875, Manchester), Nell Gwynne (1876), Two Foster Brothers (1877, St. George's Hall, with a libretto by Gilbert Arthur à Beckett), and Bella Donna (1878), had only modest success. Cellier also wrote numerous separate songs and composed for orchestra (including his Suite Symphonique (1978)) and the piano; his Danse pompadour achieved particular popularity.

=== D'Oyly Carte years ===
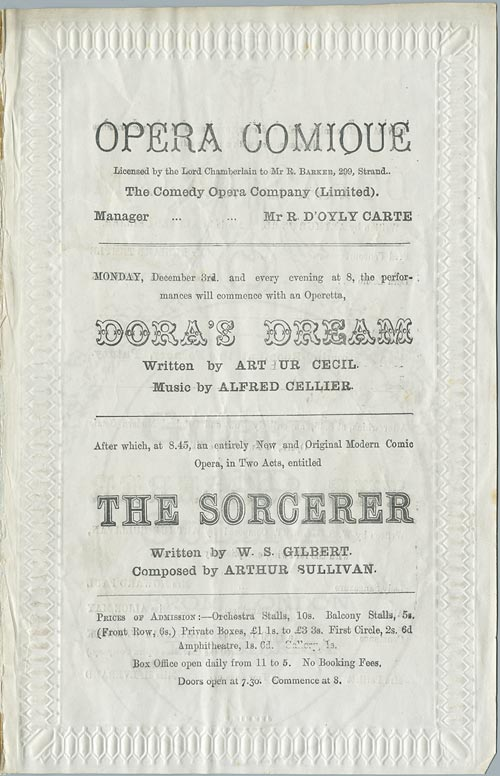
Programme for Dora's Dream and The Sorcerer from 1877

In December 1877 Cellier joined the D'Oyly Carte company as musical director at the Opera Comique in London. There he conducted The Sorcerer (1877), H.M.S. Pinafore (1878, for which he wrote the overture, based on themes from the opera), Trial by Jury (1878), George Grossmith's Cups and Saucers (1878–79), and three of his own one-act works: Dora's Dream (1877–78 revival), The Spectre Knight (1878), and After All! (1878–79). Cellier was conducting the performance of Pinafore during which the partners of The Comedy Opera Company attempted to repossess the set, and he was noted for his attempts to calm the audience during the fracas. His brother, François, succeeded him as musical director at the Opera Comique in 1879. Alfred Cellier was a conductor of a series of promenade concerts at the Queen's Theatre, Long Acre and, in 1878–1879 he was joint conductor, with Sullivan, of the Covent Garden Promenade Concerts.

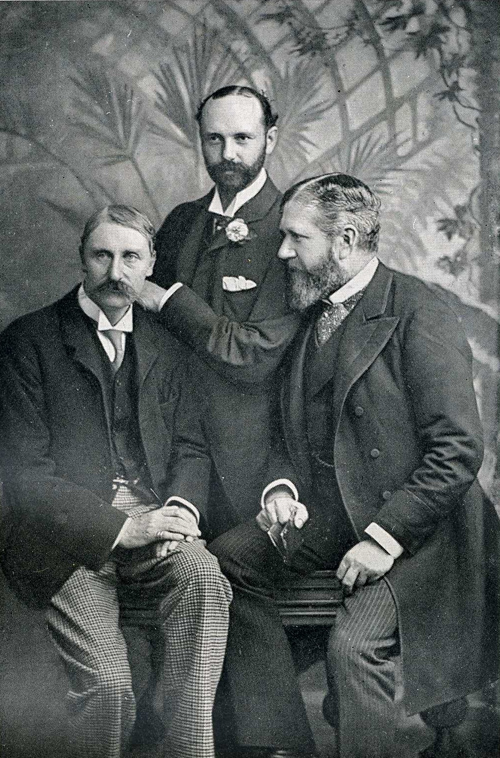
Cellier, H. J. Leslie and Stephenson

In 1879, he travelled with Gilbert, Sullivan, and Carte to America, where he acted as conductor for Pinafore and The Pirates of Penzance, with Carte's first American touring company. Cellier prepared the overture to Pirates using Sullivan's music from the rest of the score. Back in London in July 1880, he directed the music at the Opera Comique for Pirates and another of his own pieces with Desprez, In the Sulks. In April 1881, he left the D'Oyly Carte company, ceding the baton to his brother. Cellier composed a three-act grand opera, Pandora, a version of Longfellow's The Masque of Pandora (with a libretto by B. C. Stephenson) that was presented in Boston, Massachusetts, in 1881. Reviews of the premiere were mixed, praising the "gracefulness" of the music, but finding the opera lacking in dramatic intensity; it closed after two weeks. Cellier remained in America to conduct the Comly-Barton Opera Company on tour in the American West. Later that year he was music director of D'Oyly Carte's New York and touring productions of Billee Taylor (1882), Les Manteaux Noirs and Rip Van Winkle (both in the fall of 1882), and Iolanthe (1882–83), for the latter of which he prepared the New York overture.

In 1883, Cellier's setting of Gray's Elegy, in the form of a cantata, was produced at the Leeds music festival. In 1883, Cellier left the D'Oyly Carte company, but he was back for brief periods as music director with D'Oyly Carte's touring companies for Princess Ida (1884) and The Mikado (1885). In 1885, also, Cellier composed incidental music for a production of As You Like It. He composed two more companion pieces that had Savoy Theatre premieres, both with libretti by Desprez: The Carp (performed with The Mikado and Ruddigore in 1886–87), and Mrs. Jarramie's Genie (composed together with his brother François, which played together with several different operas at the Savoy between 1887 and 1889.

While in London, Cellier conducted at several London theatres, including the Criterion, the St James's, and the Savoy. Later, as a result of ill health, he resided mostly in America, where he was at times a representative for the D'Oyly Carte company, and Australia, where he conducted for the J. C. Williamson organization.

=== Dorothy and later pieces ===
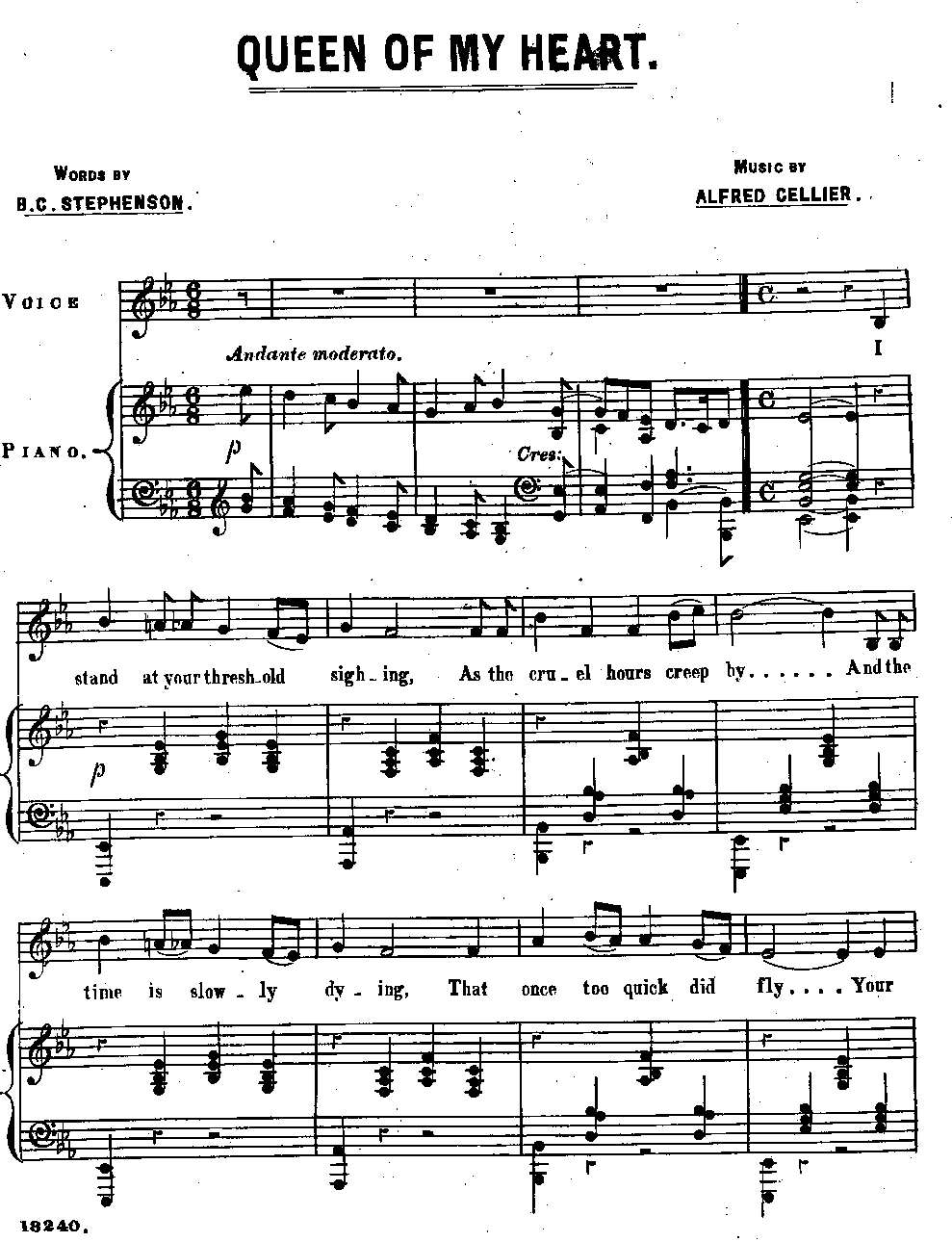
"Queen of my Heart", Dorothy's hit song, was very popular as a parlour ballad.

In 1885, Cellier composed a song, "There once was a time, my darling", for a piece produced by George Edwardes, Little Jack Sheppard (1885). Meanwhile he had composed what would become his greatest success, the comic opera Dorothy, with a libretto by B. C. Stephenson. To create the score, Cellier repurposed some of his music from his 1876 failure, Nell Gwynne, which had, nevertheless, received praise for its music. Dorothy had been announced for production at the Royalty Theatre in 1884, but ultimately Edwardes mounted it at his Gaiety Theatre on 25 September 1886. Cellier was in Australia from February 1886 to February 1887, conducting The Mikado and other Gilbert and Sullivan operas for J. C. Williamson and was absent from London during the productions of The Carp, at the Savoy, and Dorothy. Neither the music nor the libretto of Dorothy initially attracted critical praise. The Times wrote, "Gentility reigns supreme, and with it unfortunately also a good deal of the refined feebleness and the ineptitude which are the defects of that quality." Stephenson rewrote the lyrics of one of Cellier's old songs, "Old Dreams" as "Queen of My Heart"; this helped the work to find success after it transferred in December to the Prince of Wales Theatre. The following year H. J. Leslie took over the production from Edwardes and introduced new stars, including Marie Tempest and Ben Davies, who made Dorothy an even greater success at the box office. It transferred in December 1888 to the Lyric Theatre, built using the profits from the production, where it ran into 1889. Its initial run of a total of 931 performances was the longest of any piece of musical theatre up to that time, considerably longer than even The Mikado, a fact that caused consternation to Cellier's friend Arthur Sullivan. Some critics reconsidered their earlier condemnation, the work became regarded as a classic Victorian piece, and the initially despised plot was traced seriously back to the Restoration playwrights David Garrick and Aphra Behn, and to Oliver Goldsmith and even Shakespeare. Its success led to revivals of some of Cellier's earlier works.

Cellier returned to Australia in 1888 to conduct Dorothy and a revival of his earlier work, Charity Begins at Home, and made a final brief visit there for health reasons in early 1891, together with Stephenson. His last comic operas, Doris (1889, with Stephenson) and The Mountebanks (with Gilbert, produced in January 1892, a few days after the composer's death), were both modestly successful. Also after Cellier's death, Rutland Barrington used some of his music in his 1902 adaptation of Water Babies. Often in ill health throughout his life, Cellier was unable to finish The Mountebanks, and Ivan Caryll completed the score. A reviewer of the 2018 recording of The Mountebanks commented: "There is a free-flowing style to Cellier’s compositions, with fine lyrical detail and sumptuous orchestration with which he provides a wide variety of musical effects."

Cellier owed much to the influence of Sullivan. He was a fertile melodist and his writing exhibited elegance and refinement, although he was not able to infuse his music with humour in the way that Sullivan did.

=== Death ===
Cellier died at his home in Bloomsbury, London, aged 47. He was buried in West Norwood Cemetery. In 2026, a biography of Cellier by Daryl James Barclay, Alfred Cellier: In the Shadow of Sullivan, was published.

== Works ==
=== Operatic ===
Title	Acts	Premiered at	Premiered on	Librettist	Notes
Charity Begins at Home (a musical proverb)	1 act	Gallery of Illustration, London	7 February 1872	Bolton Rowe (a pen name of B.C. Stephenson)	
Dora's Dream (operetta)	1 act	Gallery of Illustration	3 July 1873	Arthur Cecil	
Topsyturveydom (musical extravanza)	2 scenes	Criterion Theatre, London	21 March 1874	W. S. Gilbert	
The Sultan of Mocha (comic opera)	3 acts	Prince's Theatre, Manchester	16 November 1874	Albert Jarret	
The Tower of London (comic opera)	3 acts	Prince's	4 October 1875	Anonymous	
Nell Gwynne (comic opera)	3 acts	Prince's	17 October 1876	H. B. Farnie after W. T. Moncrieff's Rochester (1818)	Revised as Dorothy, 1886
Two Foster Brothers (operetta)	1 act	St George's Hall, London	12 March 1877	Gilbert à Beckett	
The Spectre Knight (fanciful operetta)	1 act	Opera Comique, London	9 February 1878	James Albery	
Belladonna, or The Little Beauty and the Great Beast (comic opera)	3 acts	Prince's	27 April 1878	Alfred Thompson	
After All (vaudeville)	1 act	Opera Comique	23 December 1878	Frank Desprez	
In the Sulks	1 act	Opera Comique	21 February 1880	Frank Desprez	
The Masque of Pandora (grand opera)	3 acts	Boston Theatre, Boston, Massachusetts	10 January 1881	Bolton Rowe (Stephenson), after Longfellow	
The Carp (a whimsicality)	1 act	Savoy Theatre	13 February 1886	Frank Desprez	
Dorothy (comedy opera)	3 acts	Gaiety Theatre, London	25 September 1886	B. C. Stephenson	Revised version of Nell Gwynne
The Sultan of Mocha (revised version)	3 acts	Strand Theatre, London	21 September 1887	William Lestocq	
Mrs Jarramie's Genie (operetta)	1 act	Savoy	14 February 1888	Frank Desprez	Collaboration with François Cellier
Doris (comedy opera)	3 acts	Lyric Theatre, London	20 April 1889	B. C. Stephenson	Revised version of The Tower of London
The Mountebanks (comic opera)	2 acts	Lyric	4 January 1892	W. S. Gilbert	Music completed by Ivan Caryll

Source: Grove.

=== Incidental music ===
- Les Manteaux noirs, 1882
- Little Jack Sheppard, 1885
- The Water Babies, 1902 (Cellier's music posthumously adapted)

Source: Grove.

=== Other works ===
- Gray's Elegy, cantata for four solo voices and orchestra, Leeds Festival, 1883
- Suite symphonique for orchestra, Brighton Festival, 1878
- Barcarolle for flute and piano
- Songs.

Source: Grove.

== Notes, references and sources ==
=== Sources ===
- Adams, William Davenport. A Dictionary of the Drama, Chatto & Windus, 1904
- Ainger, Michael (2002). Gilbert and Sullivan, a Dual Biography. Oxford: Oxford University Press. ISBN 0-19-514769-3.
- Cellier, François; Cunningham Bridgeman (1914). Gilbert and Sullivan and Their Operas. Boston: Little, Brown and Company.
- Stedman, Jane W. (1996). W. S. Gilbert, A Classic Victorian & His Theatre. Oxford University Press. ISBN 0-19-816174-3.
