= Dorothy (opera) =

Comic opera by Alfred Cellier and B. C. Stephenson

- Comic opera by Alfred Cellier
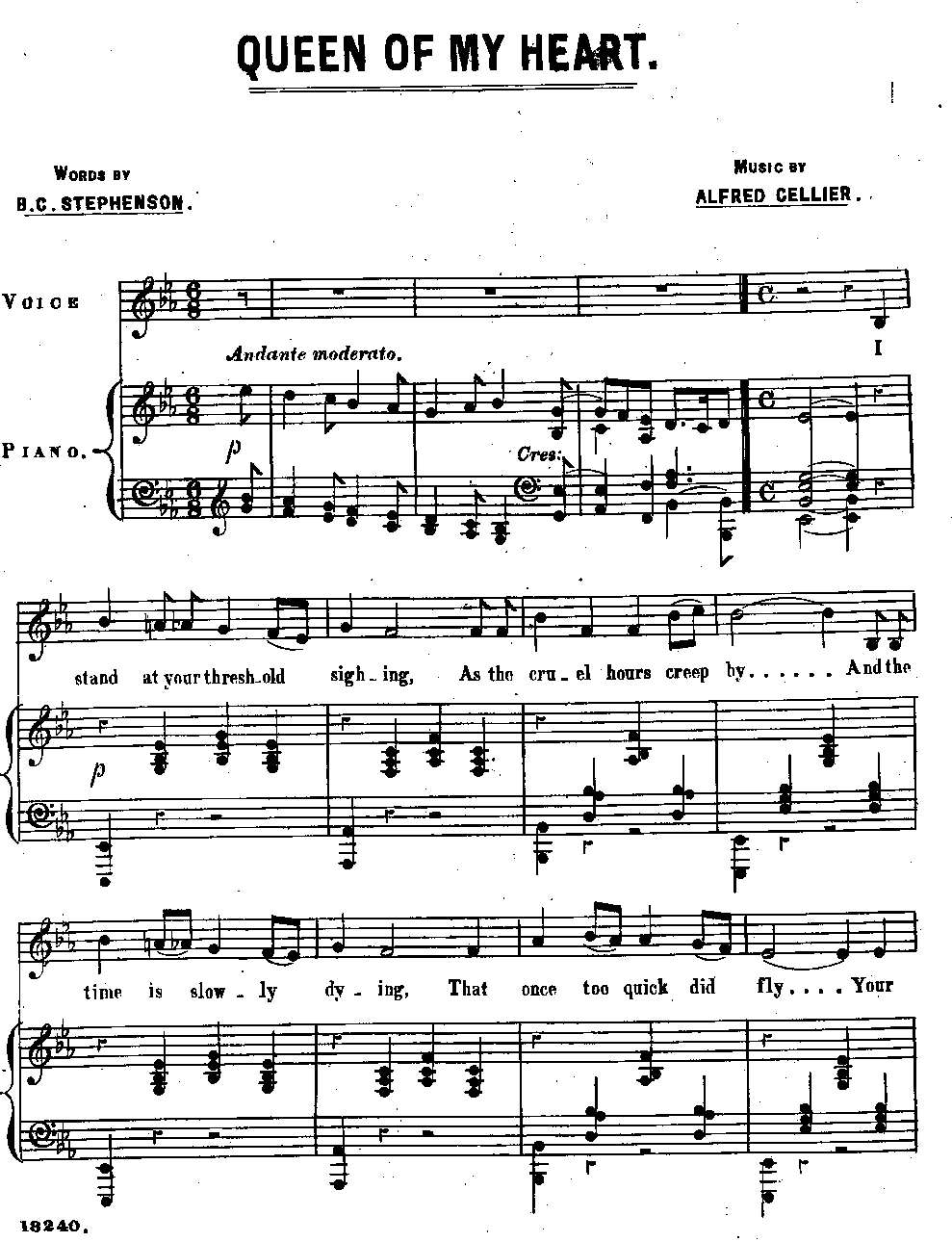
- "Queen of my Heart", Dorothy's hit song, was very popular as a parlour ballad.
- Librettist: B. C. Stephenson
- Language: English
- Premiere: 26 September 1886; Gaiety Theatre, London

Dorothy is a comic opera in three acts with music by Alfred Cellier and a libretto by B. C. Stephenson. The story involves a rake who falls in love with his disguised fiancée.

It was first produced at the Gaiety Theatre in London in 1886. After a rocky start, it was revised and transferred to the Prince of Wales Theatre later that year and then transferred to the Lyric Theatre in 1888, where it played until 1889. The piece had an initial run of 931 performances, breaking the record for the longest-running musical theatre production in history and holding this record until the run of the musical play A Chinese Honeymoon in the early 1900s.

Dorothy also toured in Britain, America and Australia and enjoyed numerous revivals until at least 1908. The piece was popular with amateur theatre groups, particularly in Britain, until World War II. The show's hit songs included the ballad "Queen of My Heart", "Be Wise In Time", "Hark For'ard!", "With A Welcome To All", and "The Time Has Come."

== Background ==
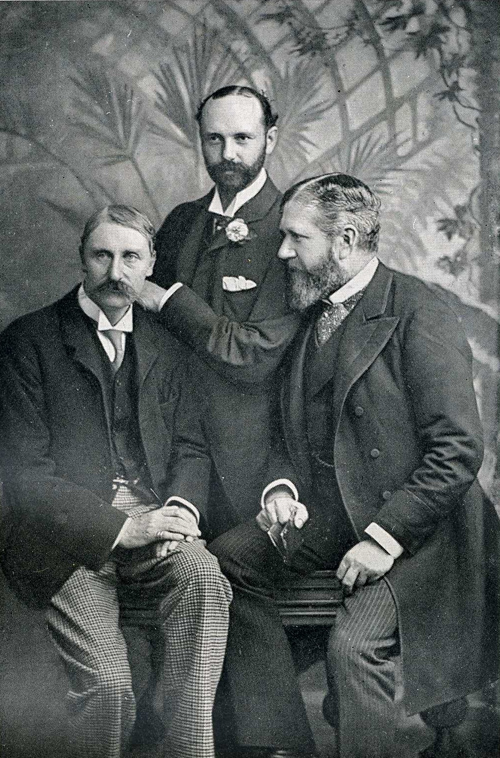
Cellier, Leslie and Stephenson

Although billed as a "comic opera" like the popular Gilbert and Sullivan operas on the London stage at the same time, Dorothy was a key forerunner of the Edwardian musical comedy, bearing many of the attributes of that genre. Its libretto is more farcical than W. S. Gilbert's satiric libretti, revolving around mistaken identities and topical humour instead of topsy-turvy plot absurdities. Dorothy anticipated George Edwardes's musical comedy hits of the 1890s and 1900s, and its remarkable success showed Edwardes and other theatre managers that audiences were ready for a shift towards the more topical pieces that soon dominated the musical theatre stage.

In 1885, Cellier had composed a song, "There once was a time, my darling", for a piece produced by Edwardes, Little Jack Sheppard (1885). Cellier, who had been a lieutenant of Arthur Sullivan, re-purposed much of the music for Dorothy from his unsuccessful comic opera of ten years earlier, Nell Gwynne, the music of which had been praised. Stephenson wrote new lyrics and a libretto to fit the music. He wrote a well-crafted play, with literary echoes of familiar themes reminiscent of Jane Austen's Emma, yet with a more modern style, suggesting its eighteenth-century setting lightly rather than with the archaic literary tone common in Victorian drama. The work was mounted in London in the absence of Cellier, who was then in Australia conducting Gilbert and Sullivan operas. In his absence it became clear that the opera needed a big romantic ballad, and Cellier's publisher Chappell suggested using one of his existing songs, "Old Dreams", which with new words as "Queen of my Heart" was interpolated into the piece and became a huge success. The sheet music sold over 40,000 copies, and the popularity of the song saved the opera from failure.

== Production and aftermath ==
The piece opened at the Gaiety Theatre on 25 September 1886. It starred Marion Hood in the title role opposite the popular Hayden Coffin, with comedians Arthur Williams, Furneaux Cook and John Le Hay. This was the first production at the Gaiety by new managing director (and later owner) of the theatre, George Edwardes, who misjudged his audience. The Gaiety was then known for burlesque, and its audiences were not looking for Gilbert and Sullivan style comic opera. The piece received lukewarm notices, and neither the music nor the libretto attracted critical praise. The Times wrote, "Gentility reigns supreme, and with it unfortunately also a good deal of the refined feebleness and the ineptitude which are the defects of that quality." After a few months, Edwardes sold the production to his accountant, Henry J. Leslie.

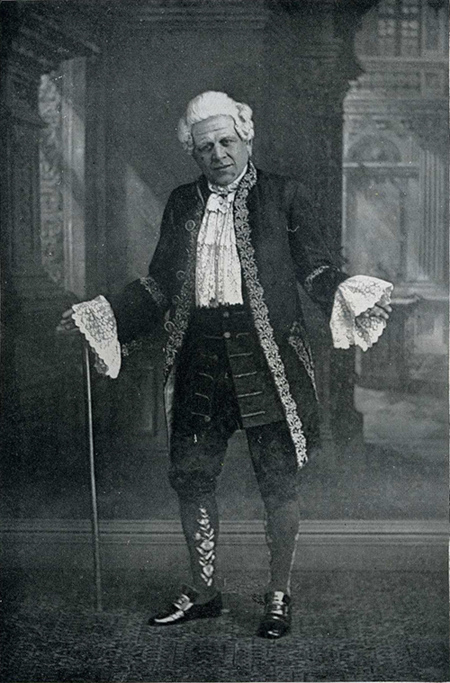
Furneaux Cook as Squire Bantam

Stephenson and Cellier revised the show, and Leslie added new stars, including Ben Davies and Marie Tempest, who took over the title role from the ailing Hood and became one of musical theatre's biggest stars. The piece reopened at the Prince of Wales's Theatre on 20 December 1886 and transferred to the Lyric Theatre on 17 December 1888, where it closed on 6 April 1889. Florence Perry made her London stage debut in 1887 in the role of Phyllis Tuppitt.

The revised Dorothy became a great success at the box office and had an initial run of 931 performances, breaking the record for the longest-running musical theatre production in history and holding this record until the run of the musical play A Chinese Honeymoon in the early 1900s. It was also the second longest known run for a stage production of any kind, after Our Boys, an 1875 vaudeville play, until both were surpassed by the run of Charley's Aunt in the 1890s. The show's hit songs included the ballad "Queen of My Heart", "Be Wise In Time", "Hark For'ard!", "With A Welcome To All", and "The Time Has Come." Henry Leslie made so much money from Dorothy that he was able to build the Lyric Theatre, where the show transferred in 1888. The success of the show also spurred revivals of some of Cellier's earlier works. Some critics reconsidered their earlier condemnation, the work became regarded as a classic Victorian piece, and the initially despised plot was traced seriously back to the Restoration playwrights David Garrick and Aphra Behn, and to Oliver Goldsmith and even Shakespeare.

Arthur Williams as William Lurcher, from The Sketch, 1894

Dorothy also toured and enjoyed numerous revivals in Britain until at least 1908, with four or five separate and simultaneous companies during the early years. Decima Moore played the title role in the 1892 revival. Courtice Pounds played Wilder on a 1900 provincial tour. There was also a New York run from 5 November 1887 to April 1888 starring Lillian Russell as the title character, and the show was revived in America until about 1900. A successful tour of Australia also began in 1887, with Leonora Braham making her Australian debut, followed by an 1888 production starring Nellie Stewart and more revivals into the 1890s. John D'Auban choreographed a West End revival in 1892 at the Trafalgar Square Theatre.

The story of Dorothy reflects touches of cynicism, early feminism, and utilises plenty of mistaken-identity and social-class-distinction comic situations. Elements of the story are derived from the 1847 opera Martha by Friedrich von Flotow, a tale of two wealthy young ladies who dress as peasants to go to the fair, fall in love with two young farmers and, after exploits, identity-confusion and ring-exchanges, are reunited with them.

== Roles and London cast ==
- Sir John Bantam, "The Squire" of Chanticleer Hall (baritone) – Furneaux Cook
- Geoffrey Wilder, Sir John Bantam's nephew and heir, a London Gallant (tenor) – Redfern Hollins; replaced by Ben Davies
- Harry Sherwood, Geoffrey Wilder's friend (baritone) – C. Hayden Coffin
- John Tuppitt, Landlord of the "Hop-Pole Inn" – Edward Griffin
- William Lurcher, A Sheriff's Officer (comic baritone) – Arthur Williams
- Tom Strutt (or Tom Grass), A Young Farmer – John Le Hay
- Dorothy Bantam, Sir John Bantam's Daughter (soprano) – Marion Hood; replaced for by Marie Tempest; Hood returned in 1887.
- Lydia Hawthorne, Her Cousin (mezzo-soprano) – Florence Dysart; replaced by Edith Chester and also Amy Augarde
- Phyllis Tuppitt, The Landlord's Daughter, in love with Tom Strutt (contralto) – F. Lambeth; replaced by Grace Huntly and then by Florence Perry
- Lady Betty, A Spinster – Jennie McNulty; replaced by Florence Neville
- Mrs. Privett, A Widow (non-singing) – Harriet Coveney
- Chorus of Hop-Pickers, Peasants, Guests, Bridesmaids, etc.

== Synopsis ==
=== Act I ===
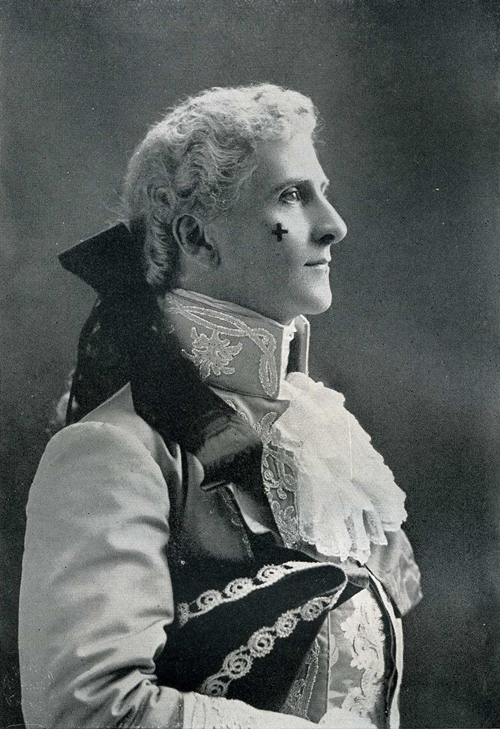
Coffin as Harry Sherwood

At old John Tuppitt's inn in rural Kent, the countryfolk of the neighbourhood of Chanticleer Hall, the property of Squire Bantam, are enjoying themselves on the morning of an autumn day in 1740. Dorothy Bantam, the Squire's daughter, and Lydia Hawthorne, his niece, take the opportunity to dress informally and join in the festivities. They find that Phyllis, Tuppitt's daughter, has promised to marry Tom Strutt, a local man. They try to dissuade her, believing that women should remain free from the fetters of matrimony. The Squire wants Dorothy to marry Geoffrey Wilder, his nephew and heir, whom she has never met and who has been leading a wild life in London.

Wilder, pursued by bailiffs, has fled London and is on his way to his uncle's house, driven by debt to comply with Squire Bantam's matrimonial plans for his daughter. Wilder and his friend Sherwood pull up at Tuppitt's inn for refreshment. Dorothy and Lydia pass themselves off as village girls, Dorcas and Abigail. Wilder and Sherwood are smitten, and Wilder rapidly gives up the idea of marrying his cousin even at the risk of arrest for debt. The principal bailiff, Lurcher, catches up with Wilder, but is prevented from arresting him because he has infuriated the villagers by serving a writ on an old woman of the village. Wilder saves him from a ducking and persuades him to help in a scheme to pay off all Wilder's debts.

Dorothy and Lydia, their insistence on permanent spinsterhood shaken by the attractions of Wilder and Sherwood, give the two men rings, making them promise never to part with them.

=== Act II ===
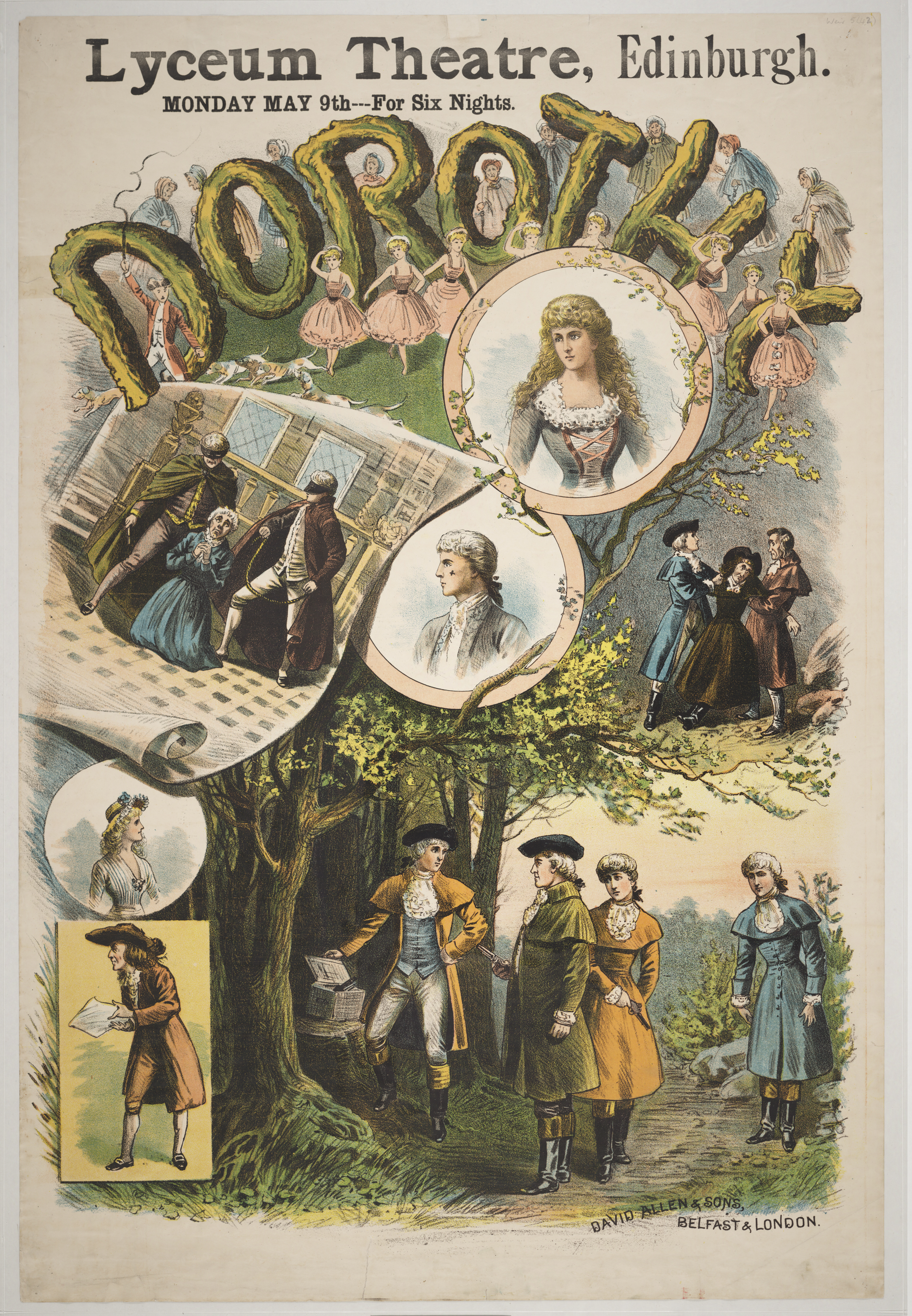
Poster for production at the Royal Lyceum Theatre, Edinburgh, 1887

Squire Bantam is entertaining guests when the arrival of a stranger is announced. This is Lurcher passing himself off as secretary to the Duke of Berkshire. He asks for hospitality for the duke and his friend, Lord Crinkletop, whose carriage has broken down. Wilder (posing as the "duke") and Sherwood (Crinkletop) are welcomed by Bantam. Dorothy and Lydia enter, but the two men do not recognise them as the rustics who enchanted them in Act I. The women play on the susceptibilities of the men. Wilder becomes beguiled by Lydia and Sherwood by Dorothy. Eventually the women succeed in persuading each man to give them the rings that "Abigail" and "Dorcas" gave the other at the inn.

The guests retire to rest, and in the dark, Wilder, Sherwood and Lurcher carry out Wilder's scheme. Cloaked and masked, they capture Squire Bantam and tie him up. At the same time, Sherwood binds Wilder. The house is soon roused by the cries; but when the guests reappear they find that the robbers have taken none of Bantam's money, but have, it seems, robbed the "duke" of a large amount (coincidentally equalling the sum of Wilder's debts). Feeling responsible for this misfortune under his roof, Bantam insists on making good the "duke"'s loss.

=== Act III ===
Dorothy and Lydia test the fidelity of their two admirers. The men have repented of their temporary infatuations of the previous night and have sent letters to Dorothy and Lydia affirming that they remain devoted to Dorcas and Abigail. By return the men receive challenges to duels, ostensibly from two young gentlemen outraged at their conduct to the two young ladies, but in fact written by Dorothy and Lydia.

The young women turn up disguised as men at the appointed site for the duel. They are pleased that Wilder and Sherwood are so dedicated to "Dorcas" and "Abigail" that they will risk their lives in a duel for the sake of their devotion. On the other hand, the ladies are anxious that the duels should not go ahead. Squire Bantam arrives, having learned of the burglary plot from Lurcher. He will forgive his errant nephew if he will consent to marry Dorothy. The ladies overlook the men's temporary wavering of the night before, and the couples are married.

== Musical numbers ==
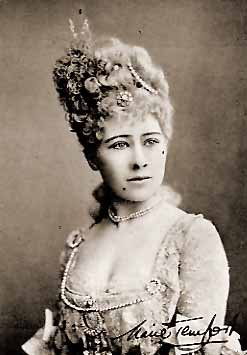
Tempest in the title role

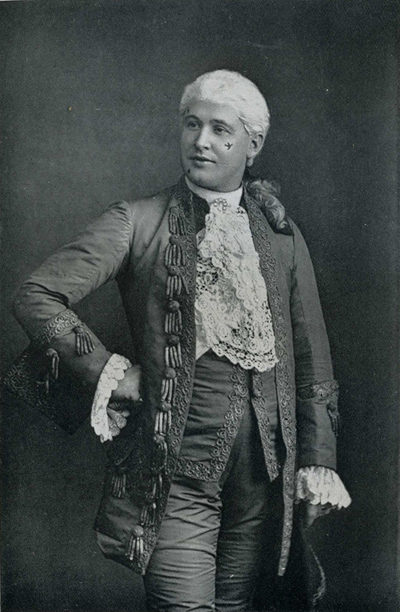
Davies as Geoffrey Wilder

Act I

- 1. Opening Chorus and Ballet – "Lads and lasses round about the hop-pole trip"
- 2. Song with Trio – "Be wise in time, Oh Phyllis mine" (Dorothy, Lydia, and Phyllis)
- 3. Quartet – "We're sorry to delay you" (Dorothy, Lydia, Wilder, and Sherwood)
- 4. Ballad – "With such a dainty dame none can compare" (Wilder)
- 5 Quintet – "A father's pride and joy they are" (Dorothy, Lydia, Wilder, Sherwood, and Tuppitt)
- 6. Song and Trio – "I am the Sheriff's faithful man" (Lurcher, Wilder, and Sherwood)
- 7. Quartet – "You swear to be good and true" (Dorothy, Lydia, Wilder, and Sherwood)
- 8. Chorus with Solo – "Under the pump" (Lurcher)
- 9. Act I Finale – "Now take your seats at table spread"

Act II

- 10. Act II Introduction and Country Dance
- 11. Song – "Though born a man of high degree" (Wilder and Chorus)
- 12. Music for the Entrance of Dorothy and Lydia
- 13. Graceful Dance
- 14. Song – "Contentment I give you and all that it brings" (Bantam)
- 15. Septet and Chorus – "Now let's to bed" (Dorothy, Lydia, Wilder, Sherwood, Lurcher, and Bantam)
- 16. Recit and Quartett – "One moment pray" (Dorothy, Lydia, Wilder, and Sherwood)
- 16a. Ballad – "I stand at your threshold sighing" ("Queen of my Heart") (Sherwood)
- 17. Trio – "Are you sure that they are all in bed?" (Wilder, Sherwood, and Bantam)
- 18. Chorus with Dorothy, Lydia, Wilder, Sherwood, Bantam, and Lurcher – "What noise was that"
- 19. Act II Finale – "Hark forward"

Act III

- 20. Act III – Ballet
- 21. Chorus – "Dancing is not what it used to be"
- 22. Ballad – "The time has come when I must yield" (Phyllis)
- 23. Septet and Chorus – "What joy untold to feel at last"
- 24. Act III Finale – "You swore to be good and true"

No. 16a became a successful ballad standard, "Queen of My Heart."

== Critical reception ==
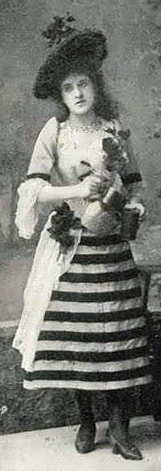
Decima Moore as Dorothy, 1892–93 revival

The press praised the music and the original production but had mixed reactions to the performances; they disliked the libretto. The Pall Mall Gazette said, "The story is curiously devoid of any interest, the dialogue is of the weakest, the lyrics have no point.... Mr Cellier's music is worthy a better fate." Other papers agreed: "To put it plainly, the libretto is not worthy of the music." Punch wrote, "The music is much better than the plot – not that this is saying much.... I fancy that Herr Meyer Lutz must have received instructions not to indulge in any of his old frivolous ways, but to conduct the music gravely and sedately – which he did. I was wondering whether he was awake all the time." Many of the critics complained that the libretto was derivative, primarily of She Stoops to Conquer.

Bernard Shaw, seeing the piece well into its long run, wrote of his pity for the cast: "Here are several young persons doomed to spend the flower of their years in mechanically repeating the silliest libretto in modern theatrical literature, set to music which, pretty as it is, must pall somewhat on the seven hundred and eighty-eighth performance.... I did not wait for the third act. My companion had all but fallen into the pit from sleep and heaviness of spirit combined.... It is a criminal waste of young lives and young talents." The Times wrote:

Not a trace of the loudness and vulgarity of the old Gaiety burlesque remains. Gentility reigns supreme, and with it unfortunately also a good deal of the refined feebleness and the ineptitude which are the defects of that quality. Neither Mr. Stephenson nor Mr. Cellier has quite met the requirements of the occasion. The former has provided a disjointed and uninteresting book and the latter a score which, although elegant, varied, and full of colour, consists almost entirely of concerted pieces, notwithstanding that there are some excellent singers in the cast.... As a desperate expedient in construction we have seen few situations to equal that at the close of the second act of Dorothy. The inmates of Chanticleer-hall (among whom the female element appears to be in an immense preponderance) are aroused from their slumbers in the middle of the night, and troop upon the stage in their night dresses. A climax to this scene, however, is needed, and Mr. Stephenson finds it in the advent of a troop of scarlet clad huntsmen, with whom the ladies, forgetful of their attire, go off to the chase—an incident that supplies the composer with opportunity for a fine hunting chorus. The music is throughout by far the best feature of the piece. Miss Marion Hood plays with much sprightliness and considerable vocal ability the part of Dorothy, and is well supported by Miss Florence Dysart as Lydia. Mr. Redfern Rollins, who has a voice but no acting capacity, is young Wilder, and Mr. Hayden Coffin, who can both sing and act, but who unfortunately is not provided with a single song, is Sherwood. In other respects the rest is as good as need be.

By the time of a 1908 revival, The Times had a more favourable view: "It is twenty-one years since Dorothy was produced.... Clearly, it is impossible to bring a cool mind to bear in judgment on Dorothy. It belongs to the golden past; it is enshrined in memory; to hear it is to grow young again. To analyse it or criticize it would be to question the beauty of the ladies with whom we were then in love.... And the pleasantest feeling of all is the conviction that Dorothy completely deserves the admiration we lavished on it. It is one of the most tuneful, most charming, and most shapely of English comic operas."

== Recording ==
In 2019, Victorian Opera Northwest released the first professional recording of the piece, conducted by Richard Bonynge with Majella Cullagh, Lucy Vallis, Stephanie Maitland, Matt Mears and the Royal Northern College of Music.

== Sources ==
- Herbert, Ian, ed. (1972). Who's Who in the Theatre (fifteenth ed.). London: Sir Isaac Pitman and Sons. ISBN 978-0-273-31528-5.
