= Jennie Lee (British actress) =

Victorian era English stage actress

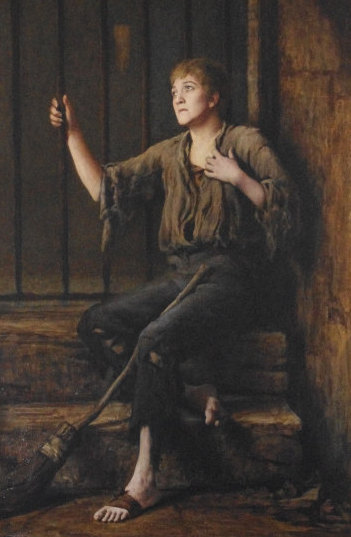
Jennie Lee by Henry Macbeth-Raeburn in 1886 as "Jo"

Jennie Lee (c. 1854 – 3 May 1930) was a Victorian-era English stage actress, singer and dancer whose career was largely entwined with the title role in Jo, a melodrama her husband, John Pringle Burnett, wove around a relatively minor character from the Charles Dickens novel Bleak House. She made her stage debut in London at an early age and found success in New York and San Francisco not long afterwards. Lee may have first starred in Jo around 1874 during her tenure at San Francisco's California Theatre, but her real success came with the play's London debut on 22 February 1876 at the Globe Theatre in Newcastle Street. Jo ran for many months at the Globe and other London venues before embarking for several seasons on tours of the British Isles, a return to North America, tours of Australia and New Zealand and later revivals in Britain. Reduced circumstances over her final years forced Lee to seek assistance from an actor's pension fund subsidised in part by proceeds from Royal Command Performances.

== Early life and career ==
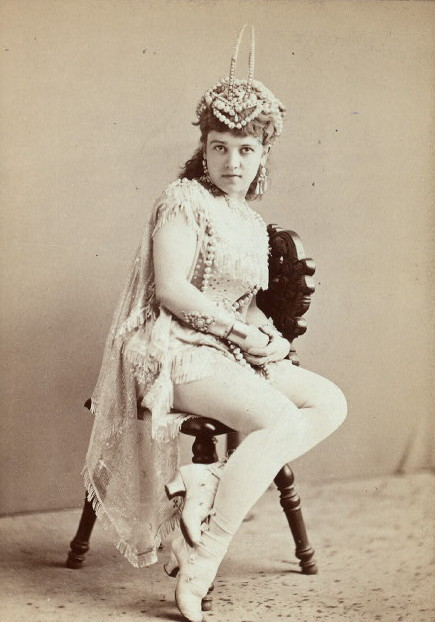
Jennie Lee, New York, c. 1872

Emily Lee was born in London, the daughter of Edwin George Lee, an artist of some note who worked in the mediums of watercolour and wood engraving. Her father counted among his friends the writer Charles Dickens and artist John Everett Millais. Lee would sometimes accompany her father to the latter's studio, where, on occasion, she would sit for the artist; as did her maternal aunt, Anne Ryan, the young woman depicted in his painting A Huguenot.

Lee was raised in a large household that included seven siblings and her father's younger brothers, whom she liked to call "her three wicked uncles". Lee once described her father as austere and that what fun she found as a child often occurred surreptitiously or while he was away on one of his frequent painting excursions. Often during these absences, she would sneak into her father's library to read books normally forbidden to her or organise family plays with the help of her three uncles.

In the fall of 1869, some eighteen months after her father's death, Lee made her stage debut at London's Lyceum Theatre as one of the twelve pages in Chilpéric, an opéra bouffe with libretto and music by Hervé. At the same venue later in 1870, Lee was a crossing sweeper in Hervé's operetta Le petit Faust, and in July 1870 at the Royal Strand Theatre she played Prince Ahmed in Henry James Byron's romance The Pilgrim of Love.

== New York ==
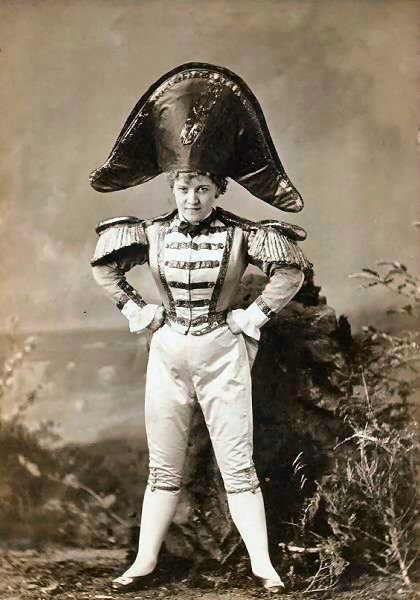
Jennie Lee, New York, c. 1872

Lee remained at the Strand Theatre through the season of 1870–71 and afterwards accepted an offer from E. A. Sothern to play Mary Meredith that fall at New York's Niblo's Garden in a revival of Our American Cousin. After Our American Cousin closed, Lee (As Jenny Lee) continued to play at Niblo's in such productions as the fairy operetta Queen Naiad, by Emile Pacardo and Charles. F. Gordon; and as Rosey Budd in Black Friday, Henry Harwood Leech's drama based on the murder of financier James Fisk Jr. Black Friday closed on 5 May 1872, just two days before a devastating fire destroyed Niblo's Garden.

The following month Lee joined the Vokes family at the Boston Theatre, Boston, Massachusetts, as Betsey Baker in a farce-comedy entitled The Wrong Man in the Right Place. Lee next appeared with the Vokes family in New York at the Union Square Theatre in the William Brough comedy Kind to a Fault, and the same venue in September 1872 she joined Agnes Ethel's company, which included J. P. Burnett, in Agnes, a play written specifically for Agnes Ethel by Victorien Sardou. After a serious illness, Lee returned to the Union Square Theatre on 31 December 1872 to play a principle part in J. P. Woolner's one-act playlette Orange Blossoms. She closed out 1872–73 season there playing Blanche in a comedy by M. Louis Leyroy entitled Cousin Jack. On 12 June 1873, the Union Square Theatre held a benefit performance on Lee's behalf with a production of Thomas William Robertson's Caste, with the British-born actor James Henry Stoddart in the role of Eccles. Afterwards Lee returned to England for a brief visit.

== San Francisco ==
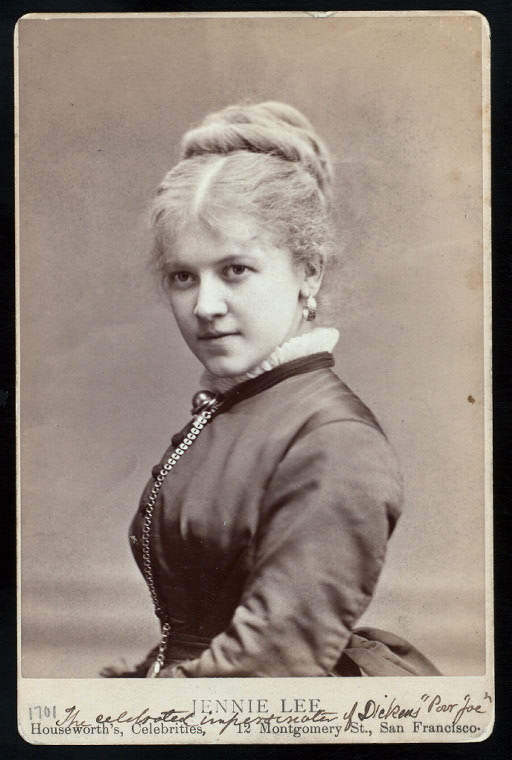
Jennie Lee, San Francisco, c. 1882

In August 1873, Lee and J. P. Burnett returned to New York aboard the Steamship Idaho and subsequently travelled by rail to San Francisco, where they joined up with Susan Galton to form the Susan Galton and Jennie Lee Opera Bouffe, Burlesque and Comedy Troupe. Their first engagements there came in early September to mid-October at the New Alhambra Theatre in productions of the comedies Thrice Married by Howard Paul (1830–1905) and Andrew Halliday's Checkmate; operettas Fanchette; The Flower Girls of Paris; Too Many Cooks; Charles Selby's three-act comedy Peggy Green; and an opera bouffe entitled Trom-Al-Ca-Zar.

By the third week of October, Lee's company had moved to Gray's Opera House, where they would remain until the end of February 1874. There she and Burnett played Mr. and Mrs. Honeyton in the comedietta The Perfect Pair; Fanny Curry and Mr. Dabster in the farce playlette Dabster Done; and in November Lee was Wanda, the peasant girl, to Galton's Grand Duchess in an adaptation of La Grande-Duchesse de Gérolstein and Fleurette to Galton's Boulotte in Offenbach's Barbe-bleue. The following month Lee reprised her role in productions of Kind to a Fault and later appeared with Burnett in the comedietta The Happy Pair. The year ended in productions of the chinoiserie extravaganza Ching-Chow-Hi, an adaptation of Offenbach's Ba-ta-clan.

Early in January 1874, Lee played Jelly, the chambermaid in an English farce entitled Beautiful Forever, and appeared in the H. J. Byron burlesque extravaganza Eily O'Conner, based on Boucicault's The Colleen Bawn. On 19 January, Lee and Burnett played Mrs. Julia Juniper and Mr. Singleton Sunbury in the Frederic Hay one-act farce Lodgers and Dodgers. A week later Lee was reported to have fallen seriously ill during an engagement in Sacramento.

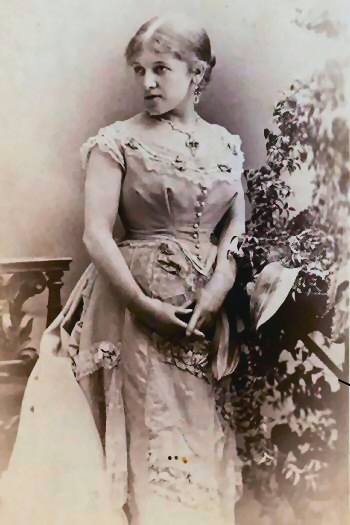
Jennie Lee c. 1870s or 1880s

By 31 March, Lee and Burnett had apparently parted from Galton's troupe and were now appearing together at San Francisco's California Theatre in Thomas Haynes Bayly's one-act farce The Maid of Munster. The two remained at the California and later Platt's Hall into the month of April appearing in the two-act English farce The Happy Pair and several benefit shows. On 23 May at San Francisco's Maguire's New Theatre Lee was the heroine Gilberte in Augustin Daly's adaptation of the Ludovic Halévy and Henri Meilhac five-act comedy, Frou-Frou.

Lee returned to the California Theatre in June 1874 for an engagement that would last into August of the following year. In June and July, she played Mary Meredith to Edward Sothern's Lord Dundreary in Our American Cousin; in July, Polly Eccles, in Thomas Robertson's comedy Home; in August, Zamora to Bella Pateman's Juliana, in John Tobin's comedy The Honeymoon; in October, Bob, the boot-black, to Frank Mayo's Badger, in Dion Boucicault's The Streets of New York; in November, Susan to William Florence's Captain Cuttle, in John Brougham's adaptation of Dickens's Dombey and Son; in December, Bridget Maguire to Florence's Bryan O'Farrell, in Edmund Falconer's Eileen Oge; in January 1875, reprised Polly Eccles for her benefit performance of Robertson's Home; and in February, Mrs. Wobbler in Henry J. Byron's drama Blow for Blow.

On 7 June 1875, Lee played for the first time Jo, the crossing-sweeper, in H. A. Rendle's stage adaptation of Dickens's Bleak House entitled Chesney Wold, with Fanny Janauschek in the dual roles of Lady Dedlock and Hortense. Later that month Lee was Lady Aubrey to H. J. Montague's Mannel, in an adaptation of Octave Feuillet's comedy Il Romanzo Di Un Giovane Povero (The Romance of a Poor Young Man), and in July, Moya, lover of Conn the Shaughraun Dion Boucicault in The Shaughraun.

== London ==
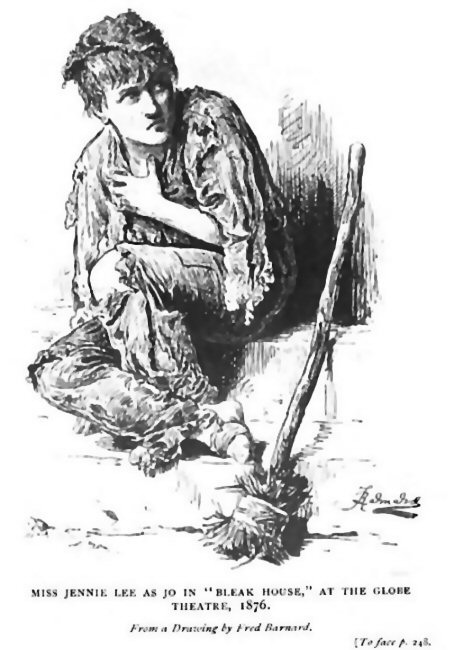
Jennie Lee as Jo, Globe Theatre, by Fred Barnard, 1876

On 4 August 1875, Lee was given a farewell benefit at the California Theatre not long before she and Burnett departed San Francisco by train to begin the first leg of their return trip back to England. On 8 November Lee first appeared on the English stage as Jo at the Prince of Wales's Theatre, Liverpool, before joining London's Surrey Theatre late that December for a near eight-week engagement playing Jack in Frank W. Green's Tom Thumb; or, Harlequin King Arthur and the Knights of the Round Table, a pantomime based on the children's story Jack the Giant Killer. On 21 February 1876 Lee began a long engagement with Burnett's adaption of Bleak House at the Globe Theatre.

The Athenaeum said that she acted the character with "a realism and a pathos difficult to surpass. A more striking revelation of talent has seldom been made. In get-up and in acting the character was thoroughly realized; and the hoarse voice, the slouching, dejected gait, and the movement as of some hunted animal, were admirably exhibited". Dickens and the Drama, 1910

In mid-April 1876, Jo left the Globe Theatre to make room for Ada Cavendish's new play, Miss Gwilt, a drama by Wilkie Collins. A short time later Burnett's play reappeared at London's new Royal Aquarium Theatre, where it closed out the 1875–76 season on 8 July with a benefit performance on Lee's behalf. On 11 September 1876, Lee returned with Jo for a near three-month engagement at the Globe Theatre that was followed by a short stay at the National Standard Theatre. On Boxing Day 1876, Lee was back at the Globe Theatre playing to positive reviews, Don Leander, the title role in James Planché's The Invisible Prince. Lee remained with the play until it closed in late February 1877 and afterwards, that June, returned to the Royal Standard to once again play Jo. Over the next several seasons Lee toured in Jo and on occasion returned to London to perform in brief revivals of the play.

Lee received positive reviews in early January 1880 for her portrayal of the title character in Midge, a comedy by Burnett and R. J. Martin which was produced at the Royalty Theatre and co-starred Burnett as John Gastern and Richard Mansell as Mr. Malony. Midge had a run of five or six weeks before being replaced by more productions of Jo. Although Midge had been fairly well received on the road, it found limited success in London. Some years later Lee told a New Zealand newspaper interviewer that in essence her success as Jo had made it difficult for her to be accepted in other roles.

== Later career ==
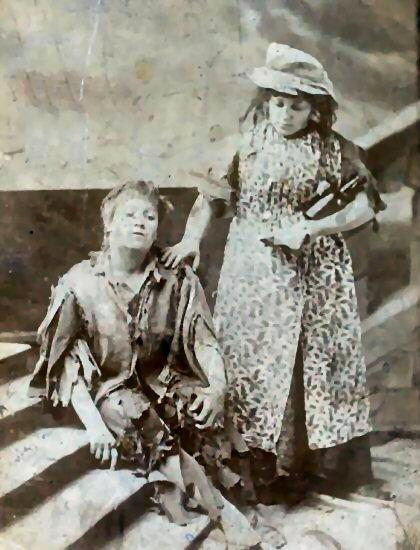
Jennie Lee (L) as Jo Melbourne, c. 1882–1908

Lee brought Jo to New York in August 1881 for an engagement at the Fourteenth Street Theatre and later to San Francisco, where she opened at Baldwin's Theatre on 7 November of that year. At the same venue a fortnight later Lee and Burnett played Mrs. Blythe and Colonel Wood in a production of F. C. Burnand's comedy The Colonel. On 6 December at Platt Hall, Lee served as celebrity auctioneer at a function tasked with raising money for the construction of a home for veterans. Over Christmas week at the Bush Street Theatre Lee played the title role in Planché's musical extravaganza Fortunio and His Seven Gifted Servants. Fortunio closed early on 9 January 1882, and after a farewell benefit show a month later at Baldwin's Theatre, Lee and Burnett sailed for Australia.

Lee opened with Jo on 29 April 1882 at the Princess Theatre, Melbourne, and was an immediate success, with a near record run of five months that was followed by three months at the Theatre Royal, Sydney. Performing Jo, The Grasshopper, adapted by Burnett from La Cigale by Halévy and Meilhac, and other productions, Lee went on to play at venues at Hobart, Dunedin, Christchurch, Invercargill, Wellington and Auckland. She eventually returned to Sydney for an engagement at the Opera House before making additional stops at Adelaide, Hobart and Melbourne. Lee would return to Australia on at least three occasions between 1887 and 1908 and would continue to appear in revivals of Jo in Britain and elsewhere for many years. Lee eventually chose to retire around 1911.

== Personal life ==
Lee's long-time husband was John Pringle Burnett, an actor and playwright born in Midlothian, Scotland, around 1846. In their productions of Jo, Burnett was usually seen in the role of Inspector Bucket. The couple had a daughter and son born in London in 1878 and 1880, respectively. Joan, their first child, was a promising young actress with a gift of mimicry. She died, a victim of tuberculosis, in March 1908 not long after arriving in Australia to play Peter Pan. Lee's second child John was killed during the First World War; possibly the John Burnett who fell on 12 October 1916 during a skirmish near the French-Belgium border. Lee's husband died the following year.

Sometime after the loss of her family, Lee fell into financial difficulties and spent her final years receiving support from the newly established King George's Pension Fund for Actors. On 7 February 1921, Lee briefly emerged from retirement to perform a scene from Jo at a fund raising event at the Lyric Theatre, London, that benefited the Charles Dickens Memorial House. In 1925 erroneous reports of Lee's death surfaced when some news agencies confused her with Jennie Lee, an American actress. Emily Lee Burnett died in London five years later.
