= The Merry Zingara =

Opera burlesque by W. S. Gilbert

Arrest of Arline: drawing of a scene from Balfe's original Bohemian Girl

The Merry Zingara; Or, The Tipsy Gipsy & The Pipsy Wipsy was the third of W. S. Gilbert's five burlesques of opera. Described by the author as "A Whimsical Parody on The Bohemian Girl", by Michael Balfe, it was produced at the Royalty Theatre, London, on 21 March 1868.

As in his four other operatic parodies written early in his career, Gilbert selected operatic and popular tunes from a variety of sources, and fitted new words to them. Although he used only one tune from Balfe's original, The Merry Zingara is the burlesque in which Gilbert's libretto stays closest to the original work. The cast of characters is nearly the same, as is the plot. In his lyrics, too, Gilbert paid great attention to the speech-patterns of his originals.

Although, as contemporary critics repeatedly remarked, the libretti of Gilbert's burlesques were more literate and intelligent than those of most of the genre, he nonetheless followed the conventional formula of rhyming couplets and tortuous puns, together with plenty of young actresses in tights or short dresses, which were the mainstays of Victorian burlesque.

== Background ==
The Merry Zingara was the third of a series of five operatic burlesques written early in Gilbert's career, between 1866 and 1869. The first was Dulcamara, or the Little Duck and the Great Quack, a musical spoof of Donizetti's L'elisir d'amore (1866). Next was La Vivandière; or, True to the Corps!, a parody of Donizetti's La fille du régiment (1867). After The Merry Zingara came Robert the Devil (1868), parodying Meyerbeer's romantic opera Robert le diable, and The Pretty Druidess; or, the Mother, the Maid, and the Mistletoe Bough (1869), a burlesque of Bellini's Norma.

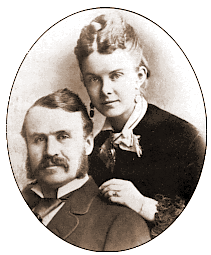
Gilbert and his wife, Lucy, in 1867

The Merry Zingara premiered as the centrepiece in a triple bill. It was preceded by a "domestic melodrama", entitled Daddy Gray, and followed by a farce called A Quiet Family. The libretto is set in rhyming couplets of ten syllables each, as are all the Gilbert burlesques. The Merry Zingara, the only one of Gilbert's burlesques to parody a work in English, stays closest to the original work, The Bohemian Girl. The plot and cast of characters are essentially identical, except for the ending, where, in lieu of the accidental death of the Gypsy Queen, Gilbert turns her into Count Arnheim's long-lost wife.

In his lyrics, too, Gilbert paid great attention to the speech-patterns of his originals, for example parodying "Voici le sabre de mon père" as "Tea in the arbour I'll prepare", and "Sound now the trumpet fearlessly" as "Brown now the crumpet fearlessly." In The Bohemian Girl, when Thaddeus reveals to Count Arnheim that he is a Polish nobleman rather than a gypsy, he shows a parchment to prove the fact. The original libretto includes this couplet: "My birth is noble, unstained my crest/ As is thine own, let this attest". In Gilbert's version, Thaddeus produces a schedule of tax assessments, singing: "My men in livery, my horses, my crest/ Which is my own, were thus assess't" (Scene V).

The success of Dulcamara and La Vivandière had shown that Gilbert could write entertainingly in this form, peppered with the dreadful puns traditional in burlesques of the period. The libretti also, at times, show signs of the satire that would later be a defining part of his work. They led to Gilbert's more mature "fairy comedies", such as The Palace of Truth (1870) and Pygmalion and Galatea (1871), and Gilbert's six German Reed Entertainments which, in turn, led to the famous Gilbert and Sullivan operas. Although Gilbert gave up direct parodies of opera within a couple of years of The Merry Zingara, his parodic pokes at grand opera continued to be seen in the Savoy operas.

=== Roles and original cast ===
- Count Arnheim – F. Dewar
- Florestein (his nephew) – Emily Fowler
- Thaddeus – Annie Collinson
- Max (his valet) – Bella Goodall
- Devilshoof – Edward Danvers
- Rudolph – Jessie Bourke
- Arline (the Count's daughter) – Martha Oliver
- Gipsy Queen – Charlotte Saunders
- Buda (Arline's nurse) – Miss Conway
- Gipsies, soldiers, citizens, nobles, &c., &c

== Musical numbers ==
- Chorus – "Brown now the crumpet fearlessly!" (Bellini, I puritani, "Sound now the trumpet fearlessly" ("Suoni la tromba"))
- Thaddeus, Devilshoof, Max and chorus – "We're much obliged to you, I'm sure" (Hervé, L'œil crevé, "La langouste atmosphérique")
- Count, Florestein, Max, Devilshoof and chorus – "Oh, what a great, what a horrible affliction" (Trad., "Toi qui connais les hussards de la garde")
- Thaddeus, Arline and Devilshoof – "Oh listen while I tell you" (G. W. Moore, "Ada with the golden hair")
- Devilshoof, Queen, Thaddeus and Arline – "Picky wicky, picky wicky, gay, gay, gay" (Offenbach, Robinson Crusoé, "Chanson du pot au feu")
- Count Arnheim and chorus – "Tea in the arbour I'll prepare" (Offenbach, La Grande-Duchesse de Gérolstein, "Voici le sabre de mon père")
- Count, Arline and Florestein – "Perhaps you're aware I'm a Zingara fair" (Trad., "Come, lasses and lads")
- Arline, Thaddeus, Queen, Devilshoof and Florestein – Oh, please; oh, please to let me go (Verdi, arr. Louis Antoine Jullien, Ernani Quadrilles, p. 4)
- Count, Thaddeus, Arline and Devilshoof – "The very self same tipsy gipsy" (Trad., "Il était un petit navire")
- Thaddeus – "When to share land in Poland allowed" (Balfe, The Bohemian Girl, "Fair land of Poland")
- Finale – "Don't go away; one moment stay" (Hervé, L'œil crevé, "Allons gaies chasseurs")

== Synopsis ==
Scene I. Exterior of Count Arnheim's Castle.

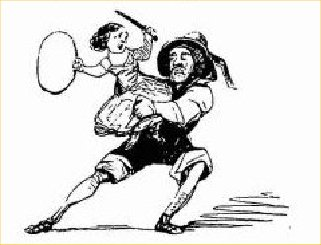
Abduction of Arline: caricature of the original Bohemian Girl in 1844

The waiting crowds cheer Count Arnheim, who makes a patriotic speech expressing his loyalty to Austria. He and the crowd go off hunting; he takes with him his beloved infant daughter, Arline. Max and Thaddeus arrive in haste. They are Polish patriots pursued by the Austrian authorities. Devilshoof agrees to help them, and having disguised them, somewhat clumsily, he sends the pursuing Austrian soldiers in the wrong direction.

Thaddeus saves the young Arline from a savage wild boar. Her father is overjoyed, and he makes much of Thaddeus until the latter refuses to drink the health of the Austrian emperor, declaring himself a Polish patriot. Just as Thaddeus and Max are in danger from the angry crowd, Devilshoof stages a diversion by carrying off Arline. Thaddeus and Max dash after him in pursuit.

Scene II. A street in Presburgh. Twelve years later. Night.

Max and Devilshoof meet the Gypsy Queen. Florestein, Arnheim's nephew, is drinking in the inn behind them. They plan to take advantage of his tipsiness to get some money or valuables off him. He staggers away, and they follow him.

Thaddeus and Arline enter. They have adopted the gypsy lifestyle. He is worried that their humble life is too dull for her. She assures him that it is not. Devilshoof attempts to persuade her to marry him, but she finds him repellent and spurns him. Thaddeus reveals to her not only the story of her childhood, but also his love for her. Arline warns him that the Gypsy Queen loves him and will be dangerous if thwarted. The Queen is secretly enraged that Thaddeus prefers Arline, but pretends not to mind, and blesses their union while planning revenge. She gives Arline a medallion that she has just stolen from the drunken Florestein.

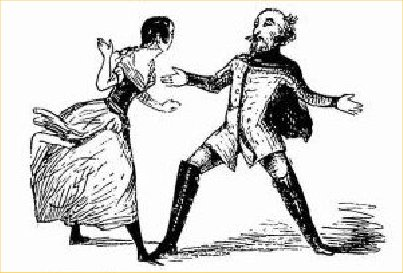
Arnheim reclaims his lost daughter: caricature of the original Bohemian Girl in 1844

Scene III. Market-place at Presburgh, with fair going on.

Count Arnheim and his suite arrive. He is still ostentatiously lamenting the abduction of his beloved Arline, but invites everyone to a tea party. Florestein sees on Arline his stolen medallion. Arline says truthfully that the Gypsy Queen gave it to her, but the Queen denies it. Thaddeus intervenes, but he too is compromised by a watch, also stolen from Florestein and given to him by Devilshoof. Arline and Thaddeus are taken into custody.

Scene IV. Interior of Hall of Justice.

The Count is the presiding judge. His practice is to convict the ugly and acquit the pretty. The first case before him is Arline's. He has already made up his mind to dismiss the case, despite his nephew's protestations, when he recognises her as his lost daughter, and reclaims her. The next to appear before him are Thaddeus, Max and Devilshoof, whom he threatens with hanging. Devilshoof plans his escape.

Scene V. Grand Saloon in Count Arnheim's house during a fancy dress ball.

Arline laments her forthcoming betrothal to Florestein. Thaddeus enters in disguise. He, the Queen and Devilshoof beg Arline to return with them to the gypsy life. Discovered by Count Arnheim, Thaddeus proves his noble birth and is acceptable as a son-in-law. The Gypsy Queen turns out to be the Count's long-lost wife, and all ends happily.

== Reception ==
The reviews of The Merry Zingara were similar to those for the earlier two opera parodies. The Morning Post wrote of Gilbert's libretto: "Travesty is no doubt his peculiar province, but he has a method of travestying which bespeaks higher art and a more refined invention than the works of some other writers … a freshness of fun and a richness of comic fancy." The staging and performances were also praised: "Richly dressed and brilliantly illustrated, the piece has every advantage that skilful and spirited performance can bestow. It is well acted and well danced, and the music, consisting for the most part of selections from Offenbach's latest compositions, with a slight admixture of modern English airs, is graceful and vivacious." The Times wrote, "Mr. W. S. Gilbert, however, shows in his last work, as in La Vivandière, which is still attractive at the new Queen's Theatre, that he is fastidious on the score of music, and consequently anxious to make the theatre, even when employed for the purposes of burlesque, as little as possible the reflex of the music-hall. ... But altogether the endeavour of the author to stop short of an extreme popularity, and to give to burlesque something like a tone of distinction, is evident throughout. His writing is at once made remarkable by the polish of the verse and the ingenuity of the puns."

The critics noted that the mandatory quotient of pretty actresses in short skirts, or playing men's roles in tights was duly delivered: although the hero was always a woman in these types of pieces, in this case, of the nine members of the cast, four were actresses playing roles en travesti. Gilbert renounced this practice as soon as he was in a professional position to do so. The critic of The Sporting Times wrote, "My friend, a stern and powerful man, held me down in my stall when Miss Bella Goodall appeared … Miss Annie Bourke, too, was something which could not be looked upon without the deepest emotion." The piece ran for 120 nights, but Gilbert later said, "It suffered from comparison with Mr. F. C. Burnand's Black-Eyed Susan, which it immediately followed [at the Royalty], and which had achieved the most remarkable success recorded in the annals of burlesque."
