= The Pretty Druidess =

Opera burlesque by W. S. Gilbert

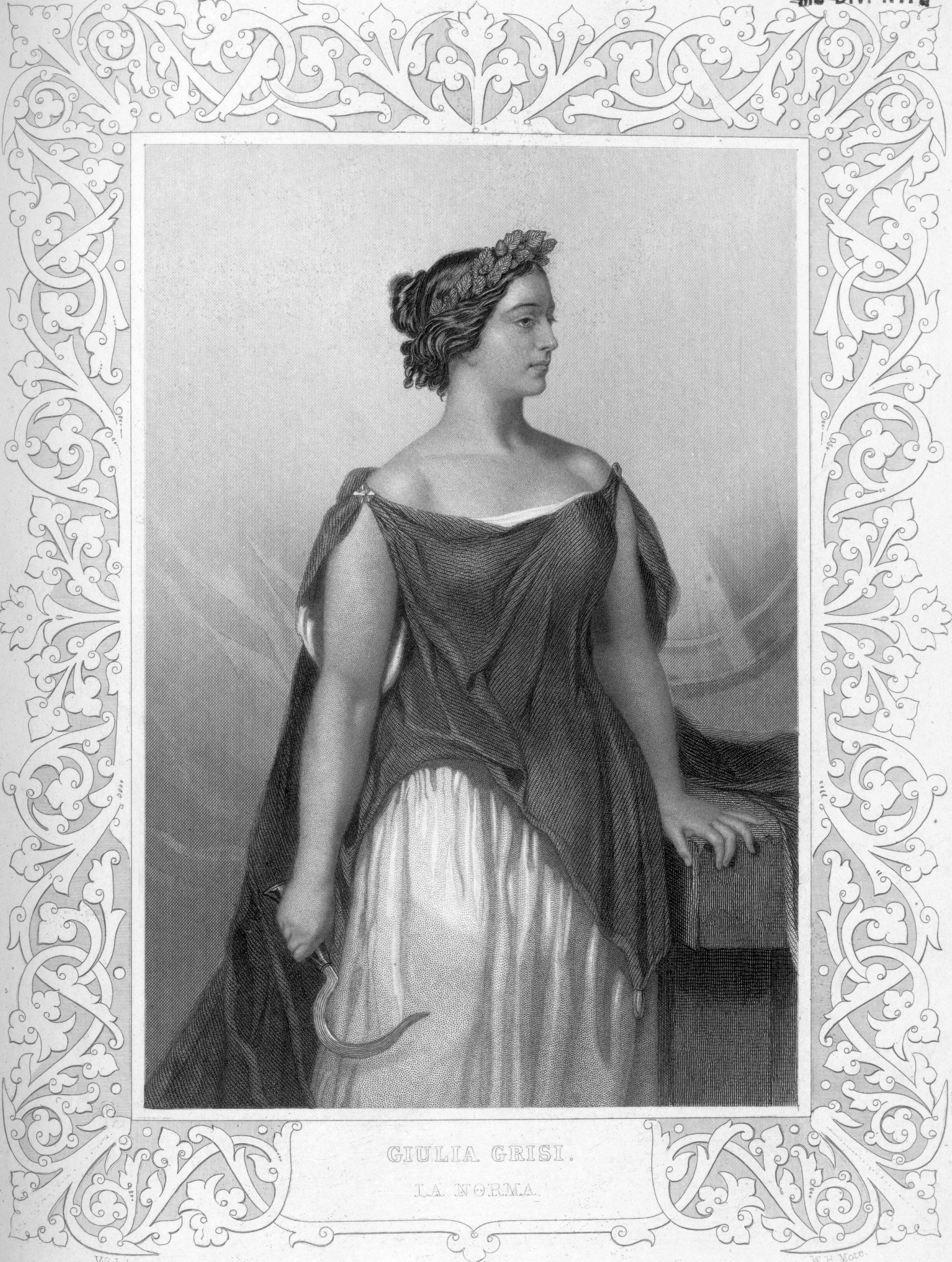
Bellini's Norma, burlesqued by Gilbert

The Pretty Druidess; or, The Mother, The Maid, and The Mistletoe Bough is an opera burlesque by W. S. Gilbert. It was produced at the opening of the new Charing Cross Theatre on 19 June 1869 and ran until September of that year.

The work was the last of five such burlesques that Gilbert wrote in the late 1860s. As in his other operatic burlesques, he chose a selection of operatic and popular tunes and wrote new words to fit them. The plot of the piece was loosely based on Vincenzo Bellini's 1831 opera Norma, with dialogue in rhyming couplets full of complicated word-play and dreadful puns.

Burlesques of this period featured actresses en travesti in tights or in dresses as short as possible without provoking the legal authorities. Gilbert later turned against this practice, and in his Savoy Operas no characters were played by members of the opposite sex.

== History ==
Gilbert's four earlier operatic burlesques, Dulcamara, or the Little Duck and the Great Quack (1866), La Vivandière; or, True to the Corps! (1867), The Merry Zingara; or, the Tipsy Gipsy and the Pipsy Wipsy (1868) and Robert the Devil, or The Nun, the Dun, and the Son of a Gun (1868) had parodied comic or romantic operas. The critic of The Morning Post had asserted that parodying comic opera was a much more difficult undertaking than parodying tragic opera, and instanced Norma as "an eminently tragic work", far easier to burlesque.

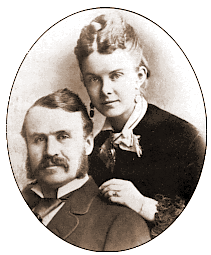
Gilbert and his wife, Lucy, in 1867

The work was written for the opening of the new Charing Cross Theatre. It was the last of three pieces on the bill, following a short operetta, Coming of Age, and the main item of the evening, a three-act drama, Edendale, about families split by the American Civil War. The part of Norma was taken by Mary Frances Hughes, well known on the London stage since her debut in November 1853. The hero, Pollio (a tenor in Bellini's original), was played as a breeches role by Cecily Nott, another favourite, who had made her debut in 1851, aged 18 or 19, a protégée of Louis Antoine Jullien. The ingénue role of the novice Adalgisa was played by Kathleen Irwin, who had made her London debut earlier the same evening, in Edendale.

On the opening night, 19 June 1869, the performance started late because of noisy protests from patrons in the cheap standing area, the pit, about the lack of programmes. Gilbert's burlesque did not begin until after 11:00 p.m. The theatrical paper The Era reported, "Although it was nearly half an hour after midnight before the curtain fell, the jokes rattled rapidly off through continuous laughter, and Mr. Gilbert was summoned at the end to receive the congratulations of the house."

The Pretty Druidess was the last of a series of about a dozen early comic stage works by Gilbert, including operatic burlesques, pantomimes and farces. These were full of awful puns and jokes as was traditional in similar pieces of the period. Nevertheless, Gilbert's burlesques were considered unusually tasteful compared to the others on the London stage. Gilbert's early pokes at grand opera show signs of the satire that would later be a defining part of his work. He would depart even further from the burlesque style from about 1869 with plays containing original plots and fewer puns. The success of these 1860s pieces encouraged Gilbert in his playwriting and led to his next phase, which included more mature "fairy comedies", such as The Palace of Truth (1870) and Pygmalion and Galatea (1871), and his German Reed Entertainments, which in turn led to the famous Gilbert and Sullivan operas.

== Cast ==
As printed in the published libretto:

- Norma (Mother Superior of the Pretty Druidess) – Miss Hughes
- Pollio (a Roman Pro-Consul) – Cicely Nott
- Adalgisa (a Novice) – Kathleen Irwin
- Oroveso (Druidic High Priest – father of Norma) – Mr. R. Barker
- Flavius (a Roman Centurion) – Miss Cruise
- Armina (Pretty Druidess) – Miss E. Mayne
- Clotilda (Pretty Druidess) – Miss Stembridge
- Ingonda (Pretty Druidess) – Miss Maxse
- Bellina (Pretty Druidess) – Edith Lynd
- Small Priestess – Miss Barrier
- 1st Soldier – Mr. Barrier
- 2nd Soldier – Mr. Lloyd

== Synopsis ==
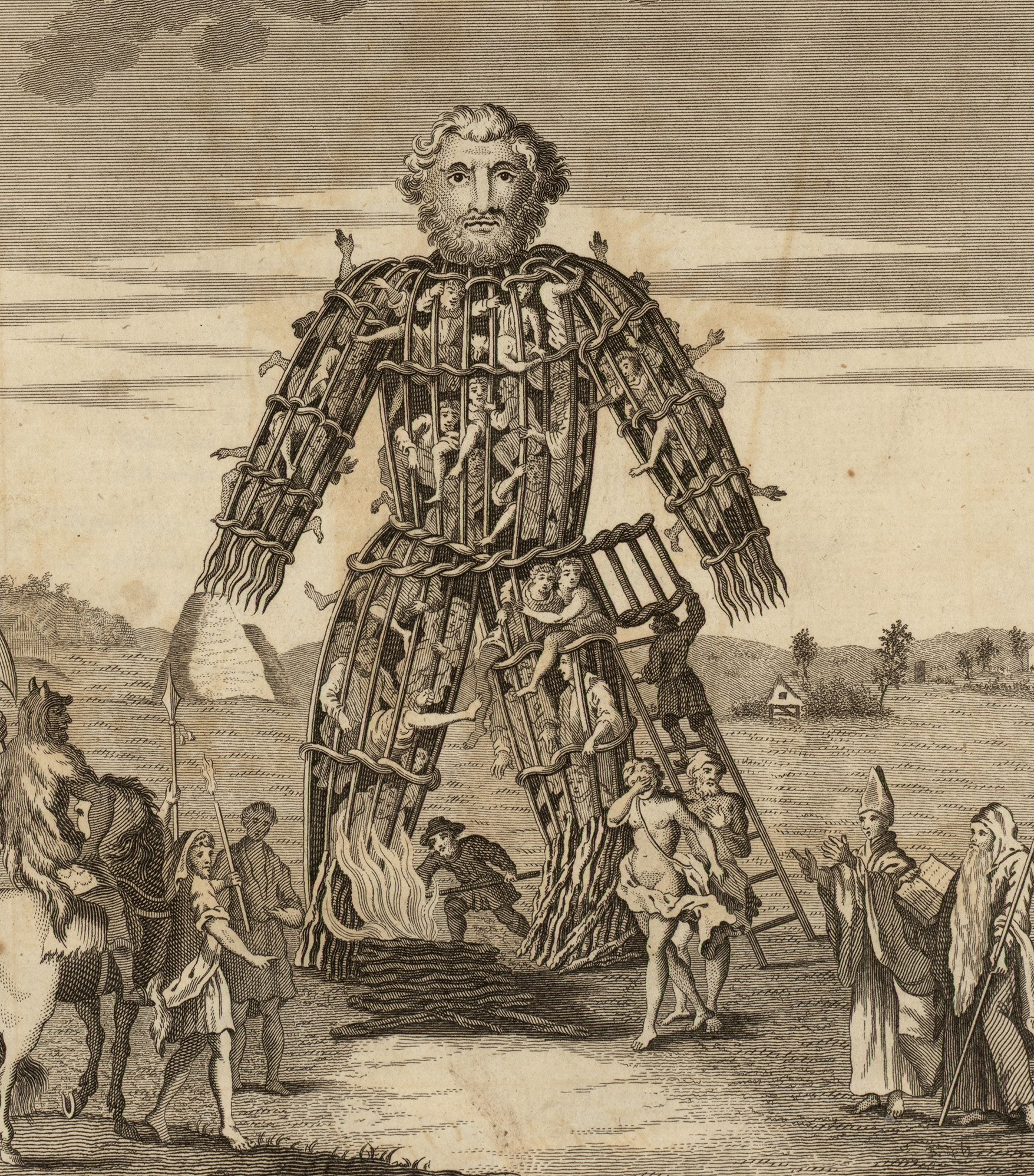
An 18th century illustration of a wicker man, the form of fiery execution that Caesar alleged the druids used for human sacrifice

Scene I – The Druidesses' Retreat (Moonlight)
The druidesses are doing needlework, creating work to be sold at fund-raising events in aid of the campaign to drive the Romans out of Gaul. The younger druidesses are not keen to see the dashing and handsome Romans driven out, but their Mother Superior, Norma, is adamant. Orovesto reproaches them for their indulgence and holds Pollio up as an example of how irritating the Romans can be. Norma enters and further encourages anti-Roman sentiments, while privately lamenting that driving them out would deprive her of her husband, Pollio, whom she has secretly married. Everyone leaves.

Pollio and Flavius enter surreptitiously, planning to spy on the druidess's secret rites. Pollio, though married to Norma, is smitten by Adalgisa. Hearing Norma's procession about to enter, Pollio cries out for help and alleges that Flavius has profaned the sanctum by embracing Adalgisa. Norma condemns Flavius to death.

Scene II – Norma's Home
Oroveso reflects that he has adopted so many personas over the years that he now longer knows who he really is. Norma and Pollio meet, and she discovers that he no longer loves her. Adalgisa begs Norma to release her from her vows because she is in love with a Roman. When Norma realises that the Roman in question is Pollio both she and Adalgisa turn on him and berate him as he attempts to defend himself.

Scene III – The Temple of Irminsul, prepared for a Fancy Fair
The fund-raising event is in full swing. The junior druidesses make rude remarks about each other's contributions. Oroveso tries to raffle fake autographs, which he has forged, of celebrities of various anachronistic eras, up to the nineteenth century.

Flavius is led out to be burnt at the stake. Norma announces that she too has sinned, by marrying Pollio, and must also be executed. Oroveso is outraged that she has married a Roman and clamours for her immediate death. The other druidesses at once confess that they have all married Romans secretly. Oroveso's lost visiting-card case is found, and he discovers that he is, in fact, Julius Caesar. He decrees that although the druid law prescribes fire as the punishment for all the druidesses and their spouses, "red fire" – a theatrical lighting effect – will suffice. The red lighting is shone on the cast and all ends happily. Norma addresses the audience with a plea for indulgence:

So for burlesque I plead. Forgive our rhymes;
Forgive the jokes you've heard five thousand times;
Forgive each breakdown, cellar-flap, and clog,
Our low-bred songs – our slangy dialogue;
And, above all – oh, ye with double barrel –
Forgive the scantiness of our apparel!

== Musical numbers ==
The numbers printed in the libretto are:

- Adalgisa, Arminia, Ingonda and Chorus – "We're all tatting" ("We're all nodding.")
- Chorus of Priestesses – "Norma's drums are loudly beating" (Bellini, "Norma viene", followed by German Reed, "Babbletyboobledore.")
- Chorus of Priestesses – "Norma now retreat is beating" (Bellini "Norma viene")
- Pollio and Adalgisa – "Pity, pity, take on me" (Trad. "The Bells of Aberdovey")
- Chorus, Norma, Pollio, Adalgisa, Flavius and Oroveso – "Oh, my. Never did I" ("Hot Corn" followed by Offenbach Ba-ta-clan arr. German Reed as Ching Chow Hi, "Boolabang")
- Norma and Pollio – "Oh, vile deceiver" (Donizetti, L'elisir d'amore,"Egli gallo della checca")
- Norma, Pollio, Adalgisa – "See Norma bounding" (Weber, air from Euryanthe)
- Norma and Pollio – "Oh farewell, oh farewell all the friends" (Gounod, La reine de Saba, "Berceuse.")
- Finale – "Please you, sirs" (Ching Chow Hi, "Boolabang.")

Reporting on the first night, The Era mentioned a parody on "Rise Gentle Moon", sung by Pollio "with good effect".

== Critical reception ==
The notices were generally good. The Gilbert scholar Jane Stedman comments that the magazine Judy had embarked on an anti-Gilbert campaign (Gilbert wrote for Judy's rival, Fun magazine), and denigrated Gilbert's unusually refined libretto by praising a contemporary one by F. C. Burnand at its expense. By contrast, The Era wrote:

The story is perverted with great ingenuity, the lines are as remarkable for correctness of rhythm as for their abundance of puns, and the parodies are written with unusual care to some of the prettiest melodies in the operatic and lyrical repertory. Miss Hughes, who sings with admirable skill and taste a grand scena, is excellent as the High Priestess Norma; and Miss Kathleen Irwin completed her triumph of the night by revealing herself as an accomplished vocalist no less than a pleasing actress as the fair Adalgisa. … Mr R. Barker as the mysterious Oroveso, who, on the restoration of his long-missing card-case, discovers himself to be Julius Caesar, largely contributed to the mirth of the audience.

The Times concurred with The Era: "Mr. W. S. Gilbert ... by his abstinence from the more vulgar jokes, and the polish of his verse, has gained for himself a position apart from that of the ordinary writers of extravaganza." The Morning Post praised the piece highly and added, "as usually happens in burlesques from the pen of Mr. Gilbert, the writing is of a higher order than in the generality of productions in this irreverent department of dramatic literature." Despite Norma's apology for "the scantiness of our apparel", the critic added the reservation that it was not scant enough: "the long dresses in which the female personages are for the most part attired detract from the smartness of the action and the picturesqueness of the general effect."
