= Carlotta Addison =

English actress (1849–1914)

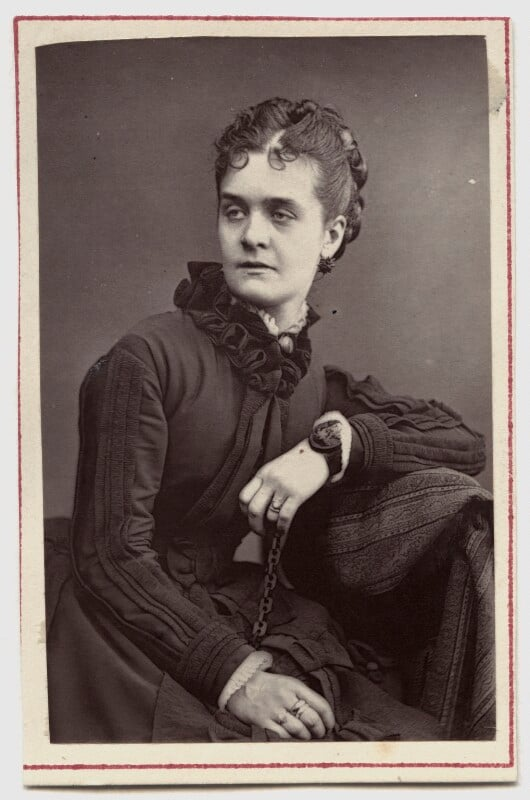
Addison in the 1870s

Carlotta Addison (9 July 1849 – 13 June 1914) was an English actress. Stage appearances included leading roles in original productions of plays by T. W. Robertson, W. S. Gilbert, H. J. Byron, Arthur Wing Pinero and Bernard Shaw.

== Life ==
Addison was born in Liverpool in 1849, the younger daughter of Edward Phillips Addison, a comedian; the actress Fanny Addison was her sister. She first appeared on stage at the Liverpool Amphitheatre. On 13 May 1865 she appeared with her father at the New Theatre Royal, Bath in a special benefit performance under the patronage of the Bath and County Club. Her London debut was in October 1866 at the St James's Theatre, as Lady Frances Touchwood in The Belle's Stratagem by Hannah Cowley. Later that year she created the role of Adina in the musical burlesque Dulcamara, or the Little Duck and the Great Quack, by W. S. Gilbert, at the St James's Theatre. She later joined the company of the New Royalty Theatre, and in February 1868 appeared in Daddy Grey by Andrew Halliday, as Jessie Bell, the central figure of the play.

=== The Prince of Wales's Theatre ===
Programme for the original production of the play M. P., with Carlotta Addison in the cast

Later the same year she joined the company of Squire Bancroft and his wife Marie Wilton at the Prince of Wales's Theatre and appeared in a revival of Society, by T. W. Robertson, as Maud Hetherington. In January 1869 at the same theatre she played Bella in the first production of Robertson's School. A reviewer in The Daily Telegraph (25 January 1869) wrote that Addison "in showing the good qualities of the pupil-teacher revealed some rare excellencies. ... There was not the slightest exaggeration in the display of her emotion, and the exquisite love scene in the third act, so full of purity and tenderness, owed much of its effect to the discreetly subdued style in which it was acted by Miss Addison and Mr. H. J. Montague."

In April 1870 she appeared at the same theatre in the first production of Robertson's M. P. as Ruth Daybrooke.

=== The Globe Theatre and later ===
In October 1871, at the Globe Theatre, she appeared in a leading role in the first production of Partners for Life by H. J. Byron. Further appearances at the same theatre were in 1872 in the first production of Forgiven by James Albery; in a revival of Cyril's Success by H. J. Byron; and in February 1873 in the first production of Oriana by James Albery.

Addison was associated more with contemporary plays than with the classics, but in 1875 she played Nerissa to the Portia of Ellen Terry in The Merchant of Venice. In October 1875, at the Haymarket Theatre, she took the role of Ethel Grainger in Married in Haste by H. J. Byron. A reviewer in The Athenaeum (9 October 1875) wrote: "So concentrated and intense was the manner in which she displayed feeling, without going outside the bounds of social custom, that a high position might reasonably be predicted for her as an exponent of realistic drama."

She married in September 1876 Charles A. La Trobe. In the following years her stage appearances were fewer. At the Prince of Wales's Theatre in 1877 she was in a revival of London Assurance by Dion Boucicault, as Grace Harkaway; at the Haymarket Theatre in 1878 she was in Sheridan's The Rivals, as Julia. In 1881 she played Minnie Simperson in Engaged, by W. S. Gilbert, at the Royal Court Theatre. From 1888 she played Ruth Rolt in two long runs of Sweet Lavender by Arthur Wing Pinero at Terry's Theatre.

In 1910 she appeared in the film The Blue Bird (based on the play by Maurice Maeterlinck) as the Fairy Bérylune, a role she had played on stage during a long-running production.

Addison died on 13 June 1914, aged 64, during the run of Bernard Shaw's Pygmalion in which she was playing Mrs Eynsford-Hill.

== Sources ==
- Clark, Barrett H. (1915). The British and American Drama of Today. New York: Henry Holt.
- Gaye, Freda, ed. (1967). Who's Who in the Theatre (fourteenth ed.). London: Sir Isaac Pitman and Sons. OCLC 5997224.
- Gifford, Denis (2017). The British Film Catalogue (Third ed.). Abingdon: Routledge. ISBN 978-1-57958-199-2.
