= Bella Goodall =

English soubrette of the Victorian theatre (1851–1884)

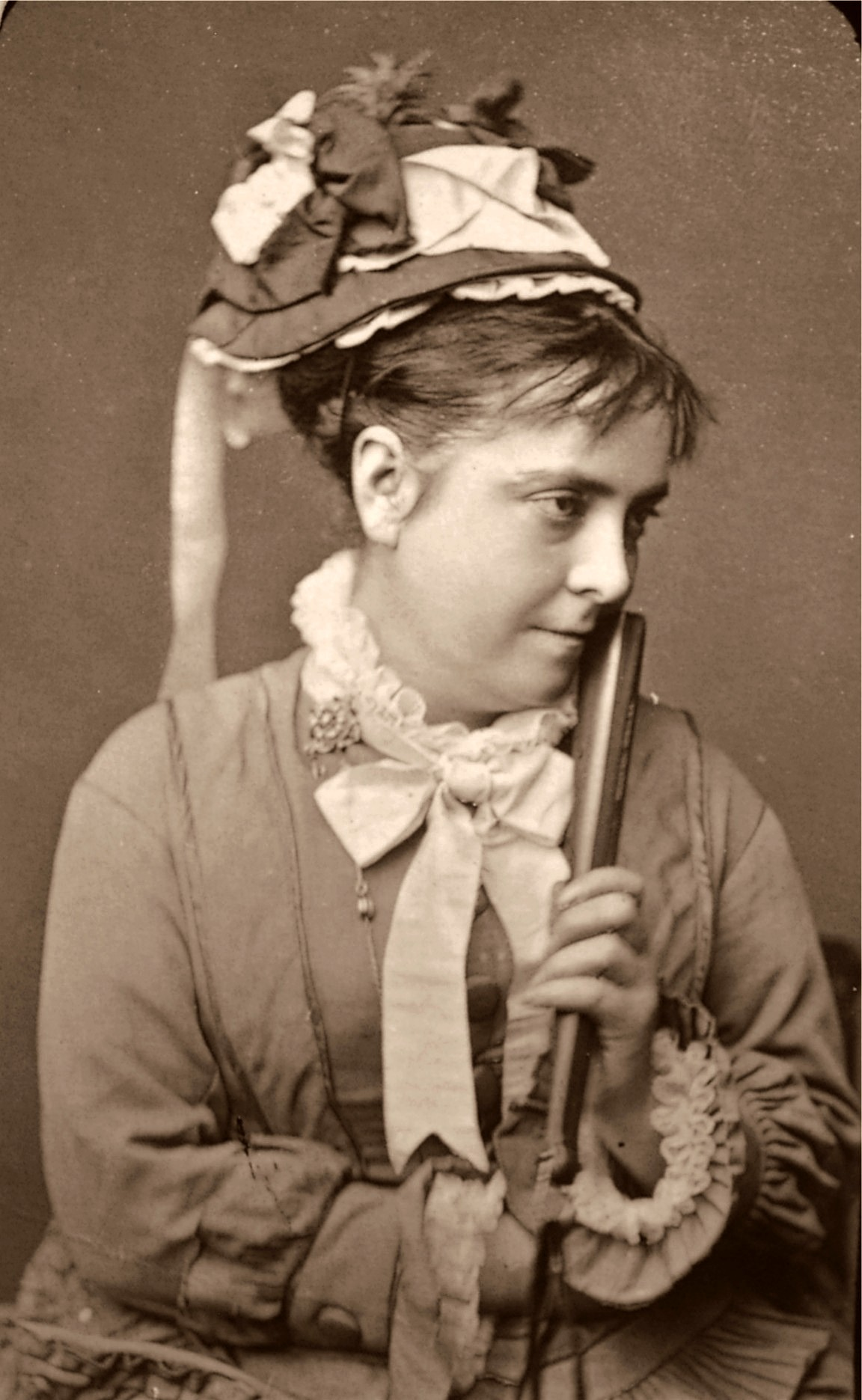
Bella Goodall

Isabella Goodall (10 August 1851 – 2 February 1884) was an English soubrette of the Victorian theatre. She made her name on the stage in her native city, Liverpool, and later became a star of the London theatre, both in burlesque and comic plays.

== Biography ==
Goodall was born in Liverpool. By 1865, she was a star at the city's Theatre Royal, Williamson Square. In February 1865 she was granted a benefit performance in which she acted and sang. Works played on that occasion included Dion Boucicault's burletta A Lover by Proxy. She also starred in productions in other Liverpool theatres at about this time. The author and journalist William Henry Rideing reminisced in 1912 about his boyhood in Liverpool, where he remembered Goodall as the reigning soubrette: "Then the orchestra would tune up and Miss Goodall, smiling and bowing, would open the most beautiful mouth in the world .... It bowled me over."

She made her London debut in April 1865 at the Prince of Wales's Theatre in J P Wooler's The Winning Hazard, attracting favourable reviews from The Era, London's leading theatre journal, and The Daily News. In July of the same year, also at the Prince of Wales's, she made a success as a comic Lancastrian housemaid in a new farce, The Mudborough Election. In December 1865 she was cast in pantomime in King Chess at the New Surrey Theatre.

Over the next two years she continued to establish herself as a leading West End player in comic plays and burlesques. In 1866 she was cast as one of two "squabbling schoolgirls intent on marriage" in H. J. Byron's One Hundred Thousand Pounds. Her subsequent performances in this period included Byron's classical burlesque, Pandora's Box, Magic Toys at the Prince of Wales's with Marie Wilton, La Vivandière by W. S. Gilbert and the farces, Mr and Mrs White and The Rendezvous. In pantomime she was "a very dashing and prepossessing Princess Eglantine" in a version of Valentine and Orson for the 1867 Christmas season, and she successfully took a travesti (male) role in Boucicault's The Flying Scud at the Holborn Theatre, playing Lord Woodbie, followed by another trousers role, the valet Max, in Gilbert's burlesque, The Merry Zingara, a parody of The Bohemian Girl.

In 1868 she joined the company of the Strand Theatre in the burlesque The Field of the Cloth of Gold and appeared with the company mainly in London but also on tour during the next four years. In 1870 she appeared as "a spirited St Patrick" in F. C. Burnand's Sir George and a Dragon, in which her dancing was "a marvellous tour de force – perhaps more vigorous than graceful, but her Irish jig is decidedly one of the most attractive features in the burlesque." During her time with the Strand company the repertoire mixed burlesques and straight plays, including comedies such as Up in the World, by Arthur Sketchley, in which she appeared in 1871 as a riotous page-boy.

She was evidently not only a practitioner of the theatre but also a teacher. In November 1868, The Era reported, "Miss Ada Arnold, a pupil of Miss Bella Goodall, made a successful debut at the Holborn Theatre on Saturday last in the burlesque of Lucrezia Borgia."

She died at Pentonville Road and was buried at West Norwood Cemetery.
