= Dulcamara =

Dulcamara means "bittersweet" (literally "sweet-bitter"). It can refer to:

- Solanum dulcamara, a plant
- Dulcamara, a synonym and proposed section of the genus Solanum
- Dulcamara, or the Little Duck and the Great Quack, an 1866 play by W. S. Gilbert
- Dr. Dulcamara, a character in L'elisir d'amore, an opera by Gaetano Donizetti
