= The Princess (Gilbert play) =

Farce by W. S. Gilbert in blank verse

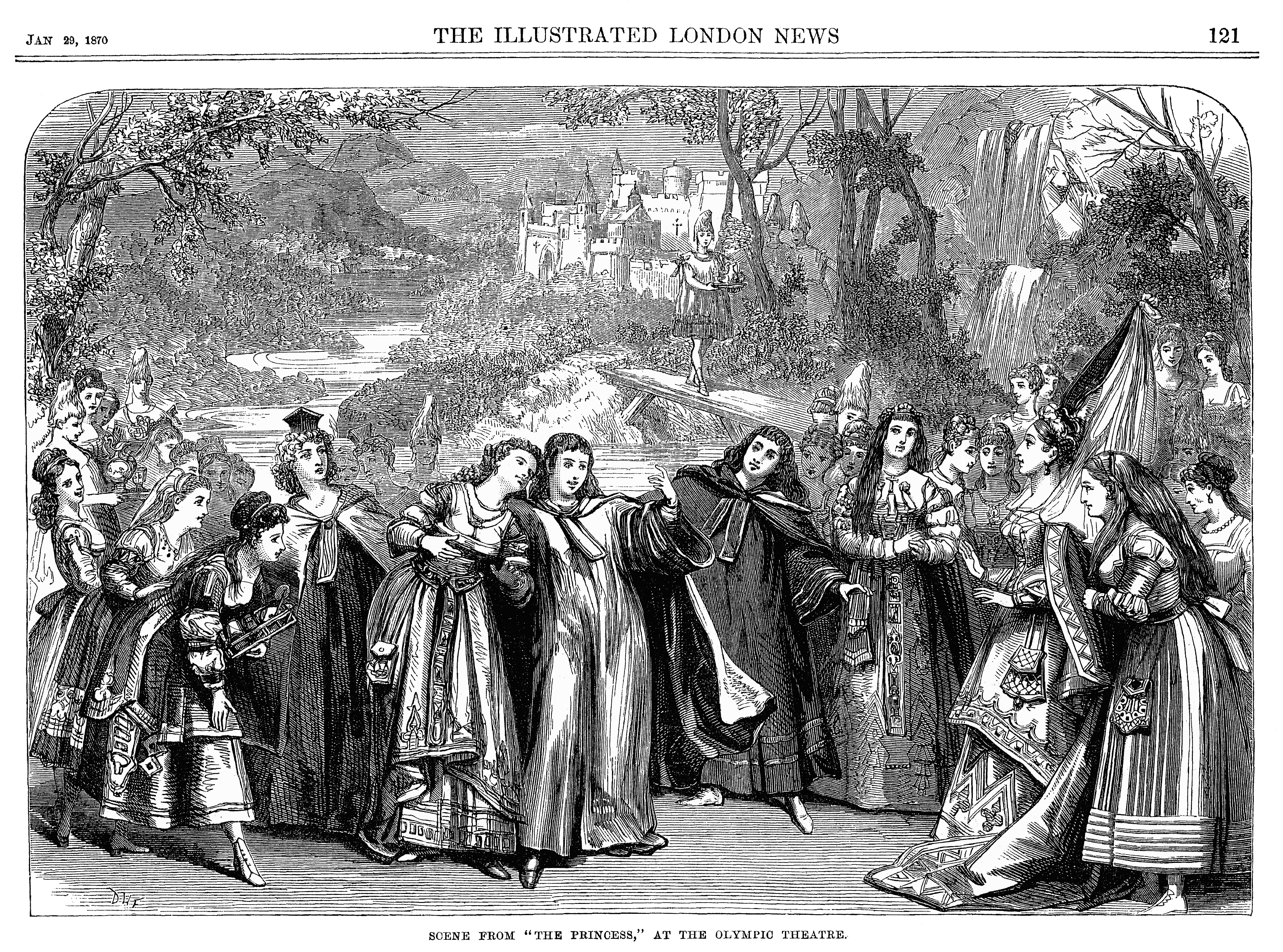
Drawing by D. H. Friston from The Illustrated London News

The Princess is a blank verse farcical play, in five scenes with music, by W. S. Gilbert which adapts and parodies Alfred, Lord Tennyson's humorous 1847 narrative poem, The Princess. It was first produced at the Olympic Theatre in London on 8 January 1870.

Gilbert called the piece "a whimsical allegory ... a respectful operatic per-version" of Tennyson's poem. The play was a modest success, playing for about 82 performances through April and enjoying a provincial tour. Gilbert liked the theme so much that he adapted the play as the libretto to Princess Ida (1884), one of his Savoy Operas with Arthur Sullivan. The Princess is a satire of women's education, a controversial subject in 1847, when Queen's College first opened in London, and in 1870 (Girton opened in 1869), but less so by 1884.

== Background ==
The Princess came fairly early in Gilbert's playwriting career, after his very successful one-act comic opera, Ages Ago (1869) and before Our Island Home (1870, another such piece). The play was Gilbert's first of the 1870s, a decade during which he wrote more than thirty-five plays, encompassing most genres of comedy and drama, including his series of blank verse "fairy comedies", beginning with The Palace of Truth later in 1870 and his first operas with Arthur Sullivan. In 1870, Gilbert was establishing his "topsy-turvy" style and proving that his capabilities extended well beyond his early burlesques and extravaganzas. The Princess is one of several Gilbert plays, including The Wicked World, Broken Hearts, and the later operas, Iolanthe, Princess Ida, and Fallen Fairies, where the introduction of males into a tranquil world of women brings "mortal love" that wreaks havoc with the status quo. Stedman calls this a "Gilbertian invasion plot".

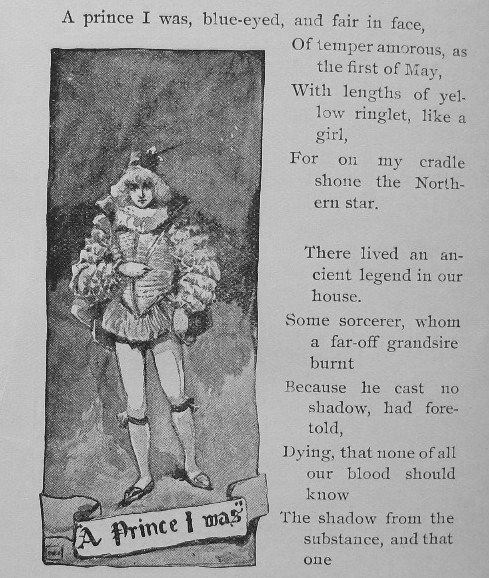
An illustration for the 1890 edition of Tennyson's poem

The play is a farcical burlesque of Tennyson's 1847 narrative blank-verse poem, The Princess. Gilbert's play is also written in blank verse and retains Tennyson's basic serio-comic story line about a heroic princess who runs a women's college and about the prince who loves her. He and his two friends infiltrate the college disguised as female students. Gilbert returned to his play in 1883, adapting it as one of his operas with Arthur Sullivan, entitled Princess Ida. When Tennyson published his poem, women's higher education was a novel, even radical concept. When Gilbert wrote The Princess in 1870, women's higher education was still an innovative idea. Girton College, the first university-level women's college in Britain, had been established at the University of Cambridge in 1869. However, by the time Gilbert and Sullivan collaborated on Princess Ida in 1883, a women's college was a well-established concept. Westfield College, London's first women's college, had opened in 1882 and is cited as a model for Castle Adamant, the women's college in Princess Ida.

The lyrics to the songs in The Princess were set to popular tunes from popular operetta and grand opera of the time, including works by Hervé and Jacques Offenbach. The three young men are played by women, so that, during a large part of the play, women are playing men disguised as women. Gilbert had been eager to try a "blank verse burlesque in which a picturesque story should be told in a strain of mock-heroic seriousness." The satire in the piece is of a higher intellectual order than the pun-filled burlesques playing in London at the time, and the publicity for the play touted this. The dialogue in Princess Ida is little changed from that in The Princess.

== Roles and original cast ==
- King Hildebrand – David Fisher
- Prince Hilarion, his Son – Maria Simpson (Mrs. W. H. Liston)
- Cyril and Florian, his friends, Noblemen of King Hildebrand's Court – Augusta Thompson and Miss Montgomery
- King Gama – Mr. Elliot
- Prince Arac, Prince Guron, and Prince Scynthius, his Sons – Jessie Earle, Miss Harrington and Miss Ewell
- Atho, King Hildebrand's Chamberlain – Mr. Franks
- First Officer and Second Officer – Arthur Brown and Mr. Davis
- Gobbo a Porter – Mr. St. Maur
- Princess Ida, Daughter of King Gama and Principal of the Ladies' University – Mattie Reinhardt
- Lady Psyche, Professor of Experimental Science – Fanny Addison
- Lady Blanche, Professor of Abstract Philosophy – Mrs. Poynter
- Melissa, her Daughter – Patti Josephs
- Bertha, Ada, Chloe, Sacharissa, Sylvia, Phoebe, Amarinthe, and Laura – Misses Joy, Clyfoard, Moore, Alma, Everard, Fitzjames, Corinne, Graham and Clara
- Lady Undergraduates

== Scenes and story ==
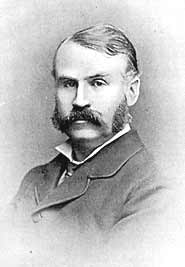
W.S. Gilbert in about 1870

The play is divided into five scenes:

- Scene First – Court in King Hildebrand's Palace.
- Scene Second – The Gates of Castle Adamant.
- Scene Third – Grounds of Castle Adamant.
- Scene Fourth – Hildebrand's Camp before Ida's Castle.
- Scene Fifth – Inner Gate of Castle Adamant.

The plot is essentially the same as the later opera: Ida's misshapen father, King Gama, and his three hulking sons (played as breeches roles in The Princess) arrive at the court of King Hildebrand. They bring news that the beautiful Princess Ida, to whom Hildebrand's son, Prince Hilarion, was betrothed in infancy, will not honour her marriage vows. She rules a women's university and excludes all men from entering. Hilarion and two companions (also played by women) disguise themselves as female students and sneak inside the walls, but they are soon discovered, eventually causing chaos and panic, during which the prince has occasion to save Ida's life. Hildebrand agrees to give Ida a chance: The outcome of a tournament pitting her three brothers against Hilarion and his two friends will decide whether she must marry the Prince. In the battle, the Prince and his friends wound Ida's brothers, after which she accepts the Prince as her husband, admitting that she loves him (in Tennyson's poem, the Prince is defeated, but Ida, nursing him to health, comes to love him).

== See also ==
- Princess Ida
