= Talfourd =

Talfourd is a surname. Notable people with the surname include:

- Francis Talfourd (1828–1862), English lawyer and dramatist, son of Thomas
- Sir Thomas Noon Talfourd (1795–1854), English judge, politician, and writer
