= Martha Cranmer Oliver =

British actress

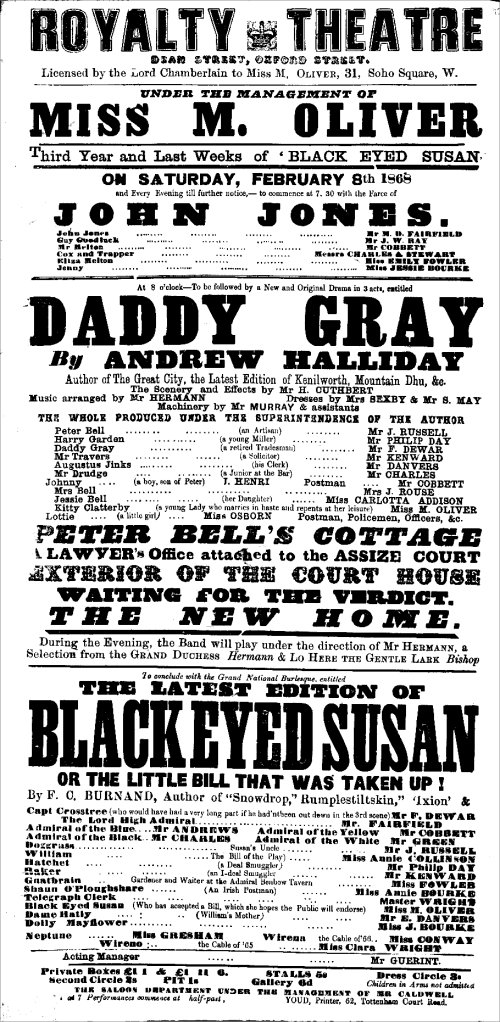
Black Eyed Susan by F. C. Burnand, Oliver's greatest success

Martha Cranmer Oliver (1834 – 20 December 1880), also known as Pattie Oliver or M. Oliver, was an English actress and theatre manager.

Beginning as a child actor near her home in Salisbury, Oliver was performing in London by age 13. She played in major theatre companies in the West End, including those of Madame Vestris and J. B. Buckstone. She was the leading comic actress at the Strand Theatre for several seasons in the late 1850s. She also played Mary Meredith in the hit play Our American Cousin at the Haymarket Theatre, among other engagements.

In March 1866, Oliver became manager of the New Royalty Theatre, often taking leading roles. In November 1866, she produced F. C. Burnand's burlesque on Black-eyed Susan. The piece was an enormous hit, playing for nearly 500 nights at the theatre, with Oliver starring in the title role. She was also known for helping members of her profession. She gave up management in 1870, acting in New York for a time with Lydia Thompson's troupe, but soon retired from the stage.

== Early life and career ==
Oliver was born at Salisbury, the daughter of Ann Oliver and John Cranmer Penson, an actor manager in Salisbury. Her sister was Frances Cranmer Oliver who married the actor Frederick Hastings Bullen. She first appeared on stage in Salisbury when only six years old. Here and at Southampton her performances of children's parts attracted attention, until in 1847 she made her London début at the Marylebone Theatre.

Her early success gained her an engagement with Madame Vestris at the Lyceum Theatre, London, which lasted from 1849 to 1855. In 1855 she went to Drury Lane, where she soon played Matilda in Married for Money, and, in 1856, Celia in As You Like It. In the same year, her performance of Helen in the Hunchback won such praise from the critics that J. B. Buckstone offered her an engagement at the Haymarket Theatre. There she was seen in Francis Talfourd's burlesque of Atalanta in 1857.

Accepting an offer from Miss Swanborough, she became the leading actress in comedy and burlesque at the Strand Theatre for several seasons. in 1858 she acted Amy Robsart in the burlesque of Ye Queen, ye Earl, and ye Maiden; in 1859 she was Pauline in H. J. Byron's burlesque, the Lady of Lyons and Lisetta in Talfourd's burlesque Tell and the Strike of the Cantons; and in 1860, she played the Prince in Byron's burlesque of Cinderella. At the Haymarket, in 1861, she was Mary Meredith in Our American Cousin, on Edward Askew Sothern's first appearance as Lord Dundreary in London. In 1863 she was at the Princess's Theatre, where she took the title rôle in Byron's burlesque, Beautiful Haidee.

== Royalty Theatre and later years ==
On 31 March 1866, she became manager of the New Royalty Theatre and opened with a revival of The Ticket-of-Leave Man, and Robert Reece's burlesque, Ulf the Minstrel. In a clever and successful piece by H. T. Craven, entitled Meg's Diversion, later that year, she acted the title part, the author played Jasper Pidgeon, and F. Dewar played Roland. On 29 November 1866 she put on the stage F. C. Burnand's burlesque, The Latest Edition of Black-eyed Susan, or, the Little Bill that was taken up. The piece, although it failed to please the critics, had an unprecedented run, and on its performance at the Royalty on 23 September 1868, it was said that Miss Oliver had repeated the song Pretty See-usan, don't say no, no less than 1775 times. During the run of this burlesque she produced as a first piece Andrew Halliday's drama, Daddy Gray, February 1868, and, later that year, a serio-comic drama by the same author, entitled The Loving Cup. Among other pieces, W. S. Gilbert's one-act farce, Highly Improbable played in 1867, and his burlesque, The Merry Zingara, played in 1869. The last night of Miss Oliver's lesseeship was 30 April 1870, when a revival of Black-eyed Susan was given for the 490th time. The Era reported that, soon thereafter, Oliver was in New York with Lydia Thompson's troupe, along with Marie Wilton.

After this period, however, she was seldom seen on the stage. She was a very pleasing actress and singer, and a general favourite with the public. The Era described the "refined vivacity and sparkling brightness" of her portrayals, her kindness, and her popularity among members of the theatrical profession. She generously advised young, and supported aged and unfortunate, actors. Oliver married, by license at the registry office, Marylebone, on 26 December 1876, William Charles Phillips, auctioneer, aged 31, son of William Phillips, auctioneer, of Bond Street, London.

== Death ==
Oliver died of cancer at St. John's Wood, London, in 1880, aged 46.
