= Talfourd Ely =

British archaeologist

Talfourd Ely FSA (1838–1923) was a British archaeologist, classicist, and author of several books, notably A Manual of Archaeology and Roman Hayling.

== Career ==
Talfourd Ely contributed many articles on archaeology to learned journals and taught Latin and other classical languages at University College London.

During the greater part of his life he was closely connected with University School and College, London. He was vice-principal and classical tutor at University Hall, classical master at University College School, and secretary of the College. This last post he resigned in order to study archaeology at Berlin, where he worked with Ernst Curtius, Kirchhoff, Robert, Furtwängler, and Wattenbach, and became acquainted with other leading scholars. He travelled largely in Europe, and had an exciting adventure at Olympia with brigands whom he routed. In his later years he was connected with many learned societies—the Antiquaries, Hellenic, Royal Archaeological, and others.

== Family and friends ==
Talfourd Ely was a nephew of Francis (Frank) Talfourd, the dramatist, and a great-nephew of Sir Thomas Talfourd, author of Ion In 1863 he married Sarah Ada Dawson, a daughter of John Dawson, Esq., Berrymead Priory, Acton. In the 1860s Henry Crabb Robinson was a lodger in the house of Mr. and Mrs. Ely in London at 30 Russell Square and was a family friend. Talfourd Ely was a grandson of John Towill Rutt, who was an early friend of Crabb Robinson.

== Selected works ==
=== Articles ===
- Ely, Talfourd (1888). "Theseus and Skiron". The Journal of Hellenic Studies. 9: 272–281. doi:10.2307/623676. JSTOR 623676. S2CID 163325712.
- Ely, Talfourd (1896). "Pompeian Paintings and Their Relation to Hellenic Masterpieces, with Special Reference to Recent Discoveries". The Journal of Hellenic Studies. 16: 143–157. doi:10.2307/623943. JSTOR 623943. S2CID 163753516.
- Ely, Talfourd (1896). "V.—The Vases of Magna Graecia". Archaeologia. 55 (1): 113–124. doi:10.1017/S0261340900014284.
- Ely, Talfourd (1896). "A Cyprian Terra-Cotta" (PDF). The Archaeological Journal. 53 (1): 115–125. doi:10.1080/00665983.1896.10852703.
- Ely, Talfourd (1898). "The Antiquities of Hayling Island" (PDF). The Archaeological Journal. 55: 286–295. doi:10.1080/00665983.1898.10852774.

=== Books ===
- A manual of archaeology. 1890.
- Olympos: tales of the gods of Greece and Rome. G.P. Putnam's sons; H. Grevel & co. 1891; based upon the German of Hans Dütschke
- as translator: Pompeii by Richard Engelmann. Famous art cities; no. 1. H. Grevel; Scribner. 1904.
- Roman Hayling: a contribution to the history of Roman Britain. Taylor & Francis. 1904. (See Hayling Island.)
