= Fanny Addison Pitt =

Fanny Addison
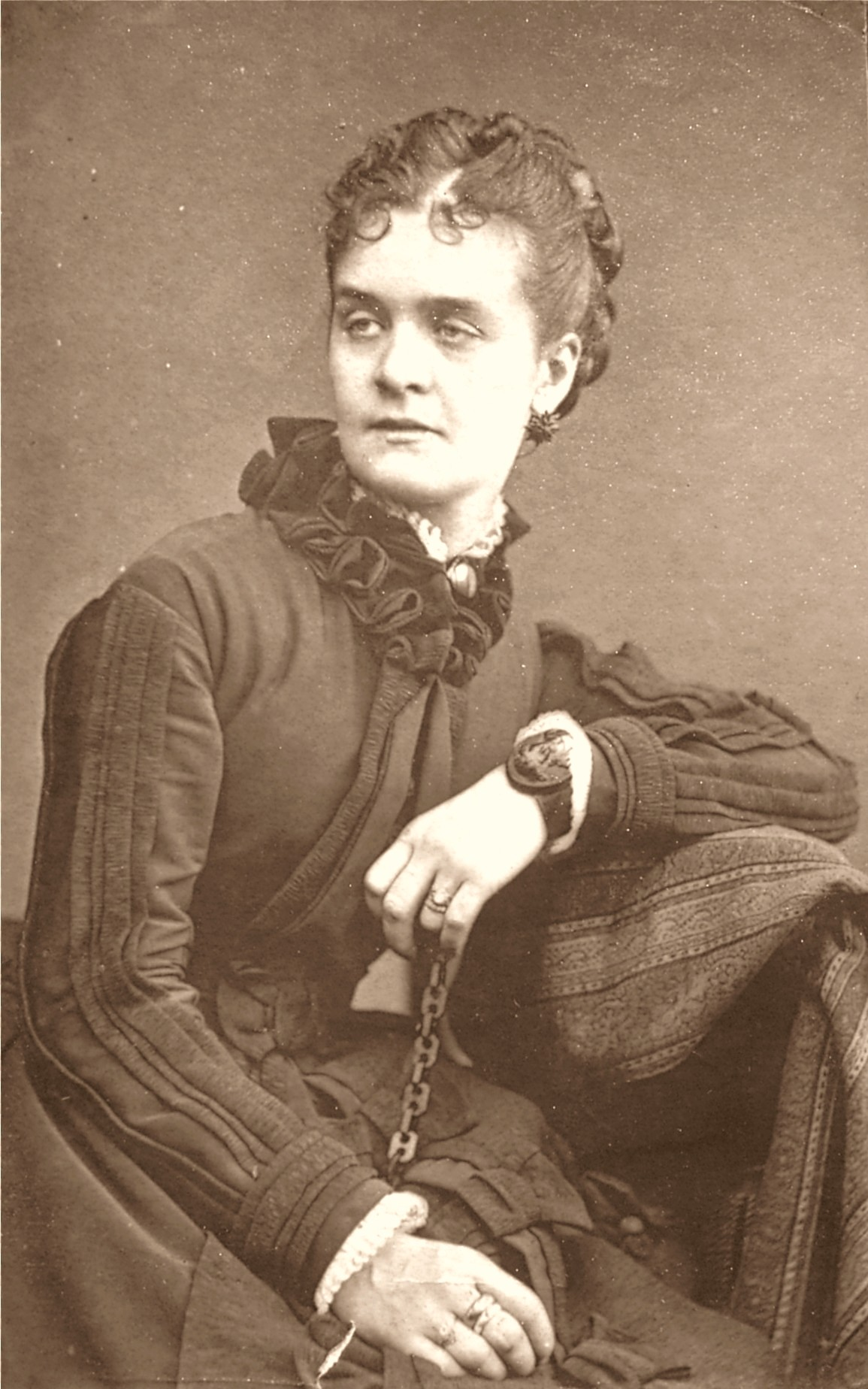
- Fanny Addison
- Born: December 1847; Birmingham, England
- Died: 7 January 1937 (aged 90)
- Spouse: Henry Mader Pitt

Fanny Addison Pitt (née Addison; December 1847 – 7 January 1937), also known as Mrs. Henry Mader Pitt, was an English actress.

== Life ==
Born in December 1847, in Birmingham, England, Fanny was the eldest daughter of comedian Edward Phillips Addison and sister of actress Carlotta Addison.

She appeared in 1867 in the Adelphi Theatre in London. The next year, she was at the Queen's Theatre, Long Acre in La Vivandière by W. S. Gilbert. In 1870, she played Lady Psyche in Gilbert's The Princess. In 1881, she performed in New York.

She died on 7 January 1937.
