= Checkmate (play) =

Checkmate is a two-act farcical play by Andrew Halliday first performed in 1869, and was one of his more successful plays.

== Productions ==
The play debuted at the Royalty Theatre in London on 15 July 1869. The 1869 cast included Martha Cranmer Oliver as Charlotte Russe, F. Dewar as Sir Everton Toffee, Miss C. Saunders as Martha Bun (Charlotte's maid), and E. Danvers as Sam Winkle (Sir Everton's groom).

The play was also revived at the Royalty in 1878 with Lin Rayne as Sir Egerton, C. Groves as Winkle, F. Leslie as Parsley, Miss R. Roberts at Charlotte, and Miss H. Coveney as Martha.

== Plot ==
Sir Everton and his cousin Charlotte have been arranged to be married, but have not seen each other since they were young. Each switches places with a servant to secretly view their betrothed before meeting them. The plot is similar to The Game of Love and Chance a French play by Marivaux first performed in 1730.
