= La Vivandière (Gilbert) =

Opera burlesque by W. S. Gilbert

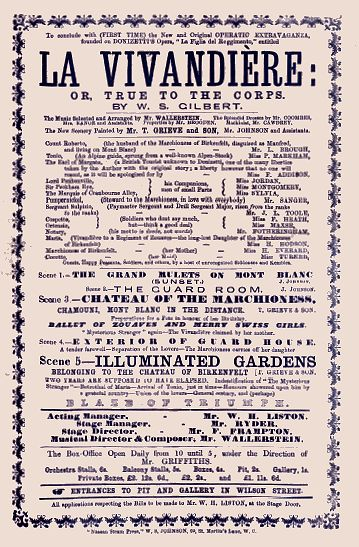
Programme for the 1868 London production

La Vivandière; or, True to the Corps! is a burlesque by W. S. Gilbert, described by the author as "An Operatic Extravaganza Founded on Donizetti's opera, La figlia del regimento." In the French or other continental armies a vivandière was a woman who supplied food and drink to troops in the field.

The piece was first produced at St. James's Hall, Liverpool, on 15 June 1867. It was then presented in London, with a mostly new cast, at the Queen's Theatre, Long Acre, opening on 22 January 1868. It was part of a series of operatic burlesques and other broad comic pieces that Gilbert wrote in the late 1860s near the beginning of his playwriting career. It was modestly successful and introduced some themes and satiric techniques that Gilbert would later employ in his famous Savoy operas.

== Background and analysis ==
Gilbert's first operatic burlesque, Dulcamara, or the Little Duck and the Great Quack, had been successful enough to encourage him to write another. It had run for 120 nights, from Christmas 1866 to Easter 1867, a good run for the London theatre of that time. As with Dulcamara, Gilbert based La Vivandière on a comic opera by Donizetti, using the composer's tunes, and those of other composers, and fitting new words to them.

Advertisement for the Liverpool premiere

The work was premiered in Liverpool, by Maria Simpson's Opera Company, billed as "The new, original, and brilliant Operatic Extravaganza ... from the pen of W. S. Gilbert, Esq." The Gilbert scholar Jane Stedman writes that the subtitle was a topical allusion to a popular melodrama, True to the Core; A Story of the Armada. In the Victorian era theatre managers normally bought or licensed plays from authors, and the authors had nothing to do with the staging of the works. Like his mentor Tom Robertson, however, Gilbert was not content to be merely the author, but sought to influence the staging of his works as much as a playwright was allowed to do. The press announcements for the Liverpool production stated that the piece was being staged under the author's "immediate superintendence". Once established, Gilbert would stage direct nearly all of his own shows. It is not clear how much the Liverpool and London productions differed. Stedman notes that Gilbert made a number of changes to the libretto for the London production. The staging of the two productions was in wholly different hands: W. H. Montgomery and George Vinning, respectively musical director and scene painter in Liverpool, were replaced by Mr. Wallerstein and T. Grieve in London, and an almost completely new cast was selected.

Gilbert generally followed the plot originally written for Donizetti by his librettists, Jules-Henri Vernoy de Saint-Georges and Jean-François Bayard, but allowed himself some variations. In the opera, the Marchioness's husband does not appear, but Gilbert presented him as a glum figure played by Charles Wyndham in Liverpool and Lionel Brough in London. The hero, Tonio, is not an Alpine guide in the original, and, as Gilbert made plain in the libretto, Lord Margate, the noisome English tourist, was a character "unknown to Donizetti, one of the many liberties taken by the Author with the original story." One reviewer noted that "the story ... acquires a new aspect from the circumstance that all the soldiers are converted into gorgeously attired Zouaves, and all the peasants into picturesque mountaineers.

Among the stock devices of Victorian burlesque, such as rhymed couplets, contrived puns and other word-play, mistaken identities, and women playing male roles en travesti, La Vivandière contains the first example of what was to become one of Gilbert's trademarks: the ageing woman whose looks, if any, are fading. Gilbert later renounced breeches roles and revealing dresses on his actresses, and made publicly known his disapproval of them. In his choice of music, Gilbert ranged less widely than he had done with Dulcamara, which drew not only on music by operatic composers including Bellini, Flotow and Offenbach, but also on a great number of music hall and other popular songs, such as "Champagne Charlie" and "The Frog in Yellow." For La Vivandière, he drew almost entirely on the music of Donizetti's original or Offenbach's similarly military operetta, La Grande-Duchesse de Gérolstein.

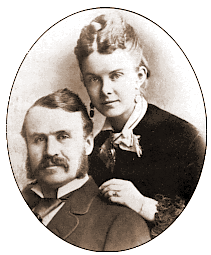
Gilbert and his wife, Lucy, in 1867

Gilbert married in 1867 amid one of his most productive periods. In addition to his other writing activities during the late 1860s, Dulcamara and La Vivandière were part of a series of about a dozen early comic stage works, including opera burlesques, pantomimes and farces. These were full of awful puns and jokes as was traditional in similar pieces of the period. For instance, in La Vivandière Gilbert included this joke on a Darwinian theme:

That men were monkeys once – to that I bow;
(looking at Lord Margate) I know one who's less man than monkey, now;
That monkeys once were men, peers, statesmen, flunkies –
That's rather hard on unoffending monkeys!

Nevertheless, Gilbert's burlesques were considered unusually tasteful compared to the others on the London stage. The Times wrote: "The chief care of Mr. Gilbert has been to make his dialogue as perfect a specimen as possible of smooth verse, and to stud it profusely with elaborate puns of unquestionable originality. ... Mr. Gilbert shows a power of detecting phonetic affinities ... in which perhaps he excels all his contemporaries. ... [S]eldom have mere verbal pleasantries provoked such frequent laughter and applause as those in La Vivandière ... an extravaganza more elegant in its tone than the generality of burlesques" The new piece ran for a total of 120 performances.

Gilbert's early pokes at grand opera show signs of the satire that would later be a defining part of his work. He would depart even further from the burlesque style from about 1869 with plays containing original plots and fewer puns. The most successful of Gilbert's opera parodies, Robert the Devil, opened in December 1868. These 1860s pieces led to Gilbert's more mature "fairy comedies", such as The Palace of Truth (1870) and Pygmalion and Galatea (1871), and to his German Reed Entertainments, which in turn led to the famous Gilbert and Sullivan operas.

== Casts ==
The original Liverpool and London casts were as follows:

Role	Description	Liverpool	London
Count Roberto	Husband of the Marchioness of Birkenfelt, disguised as Manfred, and living on Mont Blanc.	Charles Wyndham	Lionel Brough
Tonio	An Alpine guide, sprung from a well-known Alpen-stock	Miss M. Brennan	Miss P. Markham
The Earl of Margate	A British tourist unknown to Donizetti	Bella Goodall	Fanny Addison
Lord Pentonville	His companion, man of small Parts.	Miss Deane	Miss Jordan
Sir Peckham Rye	His companion, man of small Parts.	Miss Armstrong	Miss Montgomery
The Marquis of Cranbourne Alley	His companion, man of small Parts.	Miss Vining	Miss Sylvia
Pumpernickel	Steward to the Marchioness, in love with everybody.	E. Newbound	Mr. Sanger
Sergeant Sulpizio	Paymaster sergeant, risen from the ranks to the ranks	J. D. Stoyle	J. L. Toole
Cospetto	Soldier	Miss Chester	Miss F. Heath
Ortensio	Soldier	Miss J. Gunniss	Miss Maxse
Notary	His motto is deeds, not words	A. Brown	Mr. Fotheringham
Maria	Supposedly the child of the Regiment; in reality, Roberto's daughter	Maria Simpson	Henrietta Hodson
Marchioness of Birkenfelt	Her Mother	Harriet Everard	Harriet Everard
Cocotte	Her Maid	Miss E. Seymour	Miss Turner
Guests, Happy Peasants, Soldiers, and others, by a host of unrecognised Siddonses and Kembles

== Synopsis ==
Scene I – Grands Mulets on Mont Blanc. Sunset.

Lord Margate and his five companions are discovered at luncheon. They compliment themselves on their rudeness to foreigners and their contempt for any but English culture. Intrigued by a stranger, Roberto, and his unkempt appearance, they demand to know his name and history. He tells them that he has become a hermit to escape his domineering wife. He was mistakenly reported killed in battle and has remained officially dead ever since. Margate correctly deduces that Roberto must be the husband of the Marchioness of Birkenfelt; he maliciously plans to reunite the couple. He and his friends invite Roberto to abandon the hermitage and join their party. Roberto, tired of his austere existence, accepts. They meet Maria and demand a kiss. She fends them off and calls for help from Tonio, who rushes in to rescue her. The English party, unabashed, sing a snobbish song in their own praise.

Scene II – Interior of Guardroom.

The soldiers Cospetto and Ortensio discuss their sergeant's concern about Maria. She is the adopted daughter of the whole regiment, and all the soldiers care about her. The sergeant, Sulpizio, joins them and frets about Maria's absence on the mountains. She enters and reassures him that she is safe and well. He reveals to her that although she is adopted by the regiment, she is the daughter of its former captain, who, mortally wounded, gave her as a baby, wrapped in his favourite handkerchief, to Sulpizio to look after. They leave her alone, and Tonio comes in. Maria tells him that he will need the regiment's consent before he can marry her. Sulpizio, entering suddenly, finds them embracing and tells them that the regiment will consent to their marriage only if Tonio becomes a soldier. He agrees to do so.

Scene III – Exterior of Marchioness of Birkenfelt's Chateau, in Chamouni.

Festivities are under way for the Marchioness's twenty-first birthday. Margate scoffingly tells his cronies that she is at least 47. When the Marchioness appears, Margate indulges in cryptic insults about her age and appearance, which she does not seem to notice. She goes into the house, and Roberto joins Margate and the rest. He expresses his dislike of parties and socialising. They leave. The soldiers come in, lamenting their forthcoming loss of their beloved Maria. The Marchioness re-enters to reproach them for being sorrowful on her birthday, and they dry their tears. The Marchioness recognises Sulpizio's handkerchief as one belonging to her late husband. She recalls how he refused to be parted from their daughter and took her into battle with him, where they were both killed. Sulpizio tells her that though the father was killed, the baby was not, and introduces her to Maria. Margate acidly observes that the supposedly 21-year-old Marchioness must have become a mother at the age of two. The Marchioness reclaims Maria as her daughter, to the desolation of the soldiers.

Scene IV – Interior of Guard Room

Tonio, now a soldier, learns from Maria of her changed status in life, and that she cannot marry him. Sulpizio joins them in a song about her grand new lifestyle. The Marchioness arrives and takes Maria away, to the despair of Tonio and his comrades.

Scene V. – Gardens attached to the Marchioness's house

Cocotte tells Pumpernickel that Maria is to marry Lord Margate. He is distressed, as he too, loves her, though he admits that he also loves both the Marchioness and Cocotte. At the betrothal ceremony the Marchioness and Roberto come face to face and recognise each other. She reclaims him as her husband, to his dismay. Maria refuses to enter into the engagement with Margate without her father's consent. Tonio demands entry and claims her. Sulpizio disproves Margate's title to the earldom because he has several "strawberry" birthmarks, and "no peer of Margate, young, old, short, or tall, / Had ever any strawberry marks at all." Tonio exclaims, "I have no strawberry marks," and is hailed as the true Earl of Margate. He is, in addition, instantly appointed to a large number of important local posts and titles. The Marchioness consents to his marriage to Maria.

== Musical numbers ==
The following is the list of musical numbers printed in the Liverpool libretto, followed by the name of the original number pastiched. The lyrics were evidently revised for the London libretto. As none of the music was original, no vocal score was published.

- "Thoughts of care away we fling" – Chorus (Galop from Offenbach's Orphée aux enfers)
- "The fumes of wine obstruct my view" – Chorus, Roberto and Margate ("For a few days")
- "Whoever can you be, not to know" – Lord Margate, Tonio, Maria, and Companions ("The Galloping Snob of Rotten Row")
- "The playthings that you bought me, always cost a sum immense" – Sulpizio and Maria ("Mazeppa's History")
- "Sweeter lollipop" – Tonio and Maria (Offenbach, "Dites, la jeune belle", from Les voix mystérieuses)
- "Tonio devoted ne'er will we part" – Sulpizio, Maria, and Tonio (Donizetti, "Ciascun lo dice" from La fille du régiment)
- [Lyric lost] – Lord Margate ("Oh, how delightful")
- "Oh, of all men I have been the most unfortunate" – Roberto, Lord Margate and Sulpizio (Payne's Cap Dance in Cinderella)
- "Most unhappy we are, losing our Maria" – Chorus ("Oh Mary, oh Mary")
- "Your thoughts when you have left our band" – Tonio, Maria and Sulpizio ("Tootle on the Cornet")
- "Din, din, din, din, There's the hour" – Marchioness, Maria, Tonio, Sulpizio, and Pumpernickel ("Din, din, din, din, minuit sonne")
- "Oh, upon my word and honour" – Marchioness, Roberto, Lord Margate and Sulpizio ("Market Gardener")
- Finale – "And now our fun to earth is run" – Company ("Eclipse Galop")

== Critical reception ==
The Liverpool press was no more than moderately impressed by the piece, judging it "no better and no worse" than other burlesques staged locally. The London critics were much more favourable. The consensus was that Gilbert had avoided the vulgarity of most burlesques, choosing good music and writing ingenious and literate words. The Pall Mall Gazette complimented Gilbert on his good taste which was "deserving of compliment and imitation." The Standard agreed, praising Gilbert's verbal dexterity: "Up to the present, Mr. H. J. Byron has been unsurpassed in the humorous extravagance of his verbal jokes, but in True to the Corps Mr. Gilbert fairly out-Byrons Byron." The reviewer wondered if some of Gilbert's plays on words were too clever for the audience. The Morning Post began a long review thus:

The so-called "operatic extravaganza" produced last night under the title "La Vivandière; or, True to the Corps," does not, as one might at first suppose, belong to the same class of works as Mr. Sullivan's burlesque operas "Cox and Box" and the "Contrabandista." In "La Vivandière", the descriptive title, "operatic extravaganza," is justified only by the fact that the work is based on the libretto of an opera. It was a daring thing to attempt to make fun of "La Fille du Régiment," for the simple reason that the piece is of a serio-comic nature in its original form ... we should have thought it about as hopeful an enterprise as to parody a comic song. However, we must judge by results. Mr. W. S. Gilbert has already shown, in "Dulcamara," that he could produce an effective travesty of a comic opera, and he has given us a fresh and still more brilliant proof of that power in his happily named "True to the Corps."
