= Francis Talfourd =

English barrister and dramatist

Francis Talfourd (also Frank) (1828–1862) was an English barrister, better known as a dramatist.

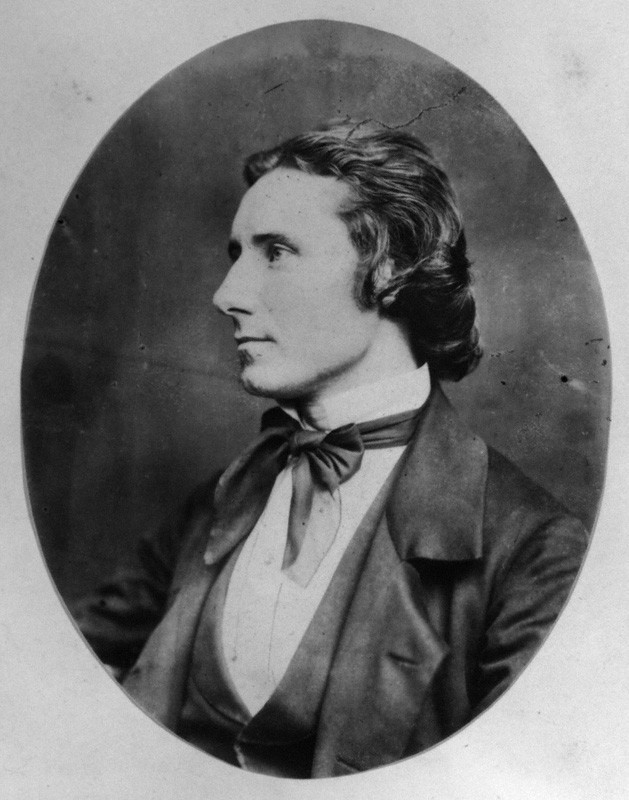
Francis Talfourd

== Life ==
He was the eldest son of Thomas Noon Talfourd, by his wife Rachel, eldest daughter of John Towill Rutt. He was educated at Eton College from 1841 to 1845, on 15 May in which year he matriculated from Christ Church, Oxford. At Oxford he, along with William Kirkpatrick Riland Bedford and several others, founded the Oxford Dramatic Amateurs. Talfourd was called to the bar at the Middle Temple on 17 November 1852, and occasionally went on the circuit.

Talfourd died at Mentone on 9 March 1862, in his thirty-fourth year.

== Works ==
Talfourd was known as the writer of a series of burlesques and extravaganzas. His first piece, Macbeth Travestie, was originally produced during the Henley Regatta on 17 June 1847, and then went to the Strand Theatre on 10 January 1848, and the Olympic Theatre on 25 April 1853. His light, ephemeral pieces were popular. They included:

- Alcestis, the original Strong-minded Woman, a burlesque brought out on 4 July 1850;
- The Rule of Three, a comedietta, 20 December 1858;
- Tell and the Strike of the Cantons, 26 December 1859, an extravaganza, in which Marie Wilton played Albert, and Patty Oliver was Lisetta.

These were at the Strand Theatre. At the Olympic he brought out Ganem, the Slave of Love, on 31 May 1852, and Shylock, or the Merchant of Venice preserved, on 4 July 1853, with Thomas Frederick Robson giving a tragi-comic representation of Shylock. For the Haymarket Theatre he wrote Pluto and Proserpine on 5 April 1858, and Electra, in a new Electric Light, on 25 April 1859, in which Maria Ternan was seen as Orestes. On 26 December 1854 he brought out at the St. James's Abou Hassan, or the Hunt after Happiness, in which John Laurence Toole made one of his early appearances. With Henry James Byron he collaborated in bringing out his last piece, The Miller and his Men, at the Strand Theatre on 9 April 1860.

== Family ==
Talfourd married, on 5 November 1861, Frances Louisa Morgan, second daughter of Josiah Towne, a solicitor of Margate. Talfourd was an uncle of the archaeologist Talfourd Ely (1838–1923).

== Notes ==
Attribution

This article incorporates text from a publication now in the public domain: Lee, Sidney, ed. (1898). "Talfourd, Francis". Dictionary of National Biography. Vol. 55. London: Smith, Elder & Co.
