= William Henry Rideing =

American author

William Henry Rideing (17 February 1853, Liverpool – 1918) was an American author with strong connections to England.

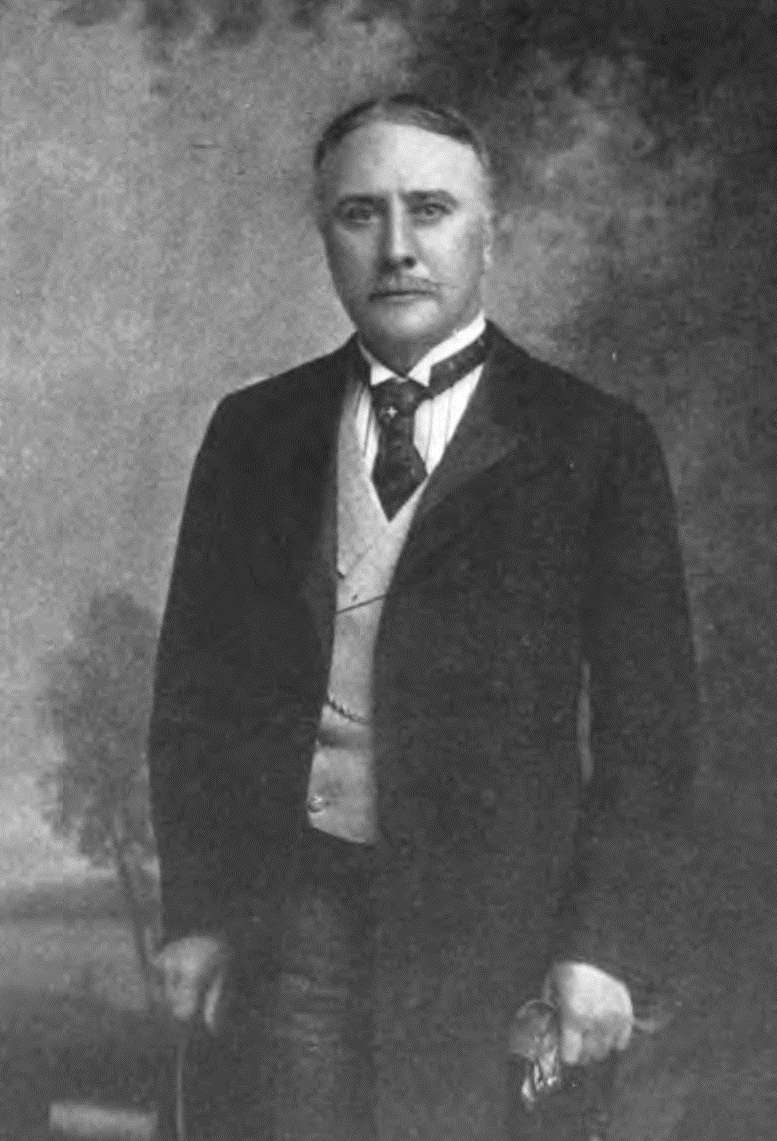
WIlliam Henry Rideing

== Biography ==
Rideing's father was an officer in the service of the Cunard Line. After the death of his mother, Rideing went to Chicago, Illinois, where he remained until 1870.

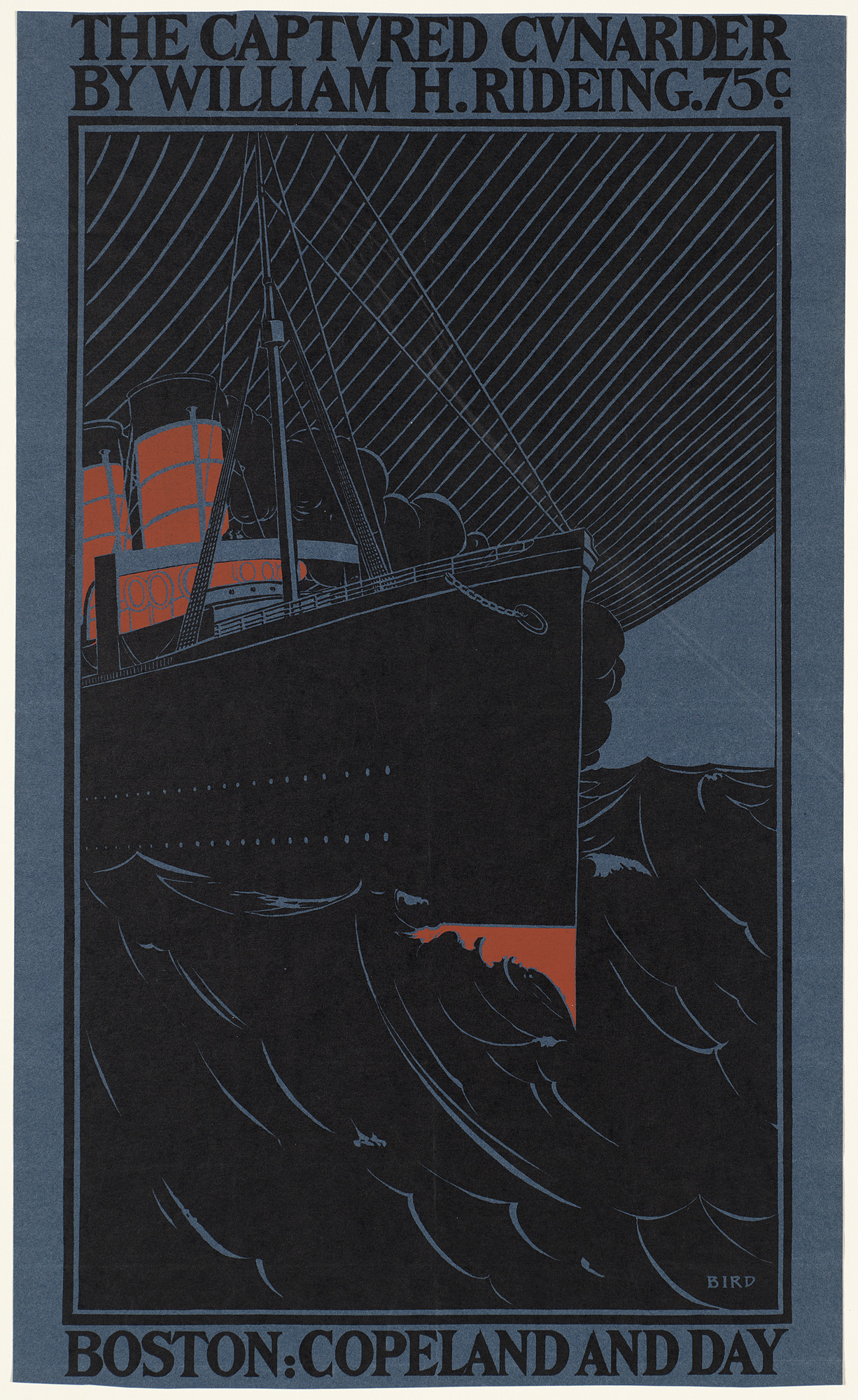
The Captured Cunarder (1896)

He early began writing for the press, and soon became connected with several journals. In 1874, he gave up newspaper work to devote himself entirely to literature and magazine writing. He made several trips to Europe and elsewhere with different artists to obtain material on special subjects. In 1878, he served as special correspondent with the Wheeler Survey expedition in Colorado, New Mexico, Nevada, California, and Arizona. From 1881 to 1883, Rideing edited Dramatic Notes in London, England. On his return to America he again entered journalism in Boston.

== Selected works ==
- Pacific Railways Illustrated (New York, 1878)
- A-Saddle in the Wild West (London, 1879)
- A Trail in the Far Southwest (1876)
- The White Mountains (1877)
- Scenery of the Pacific railways, and Colorado (1878)
- A floating city of the Atlantic : a reminiscence of travel (1879)
- Stray Moments with Thackeray (New York, 1880)
- The Alpenstock : a book about the Alps and Alpine adventure (1880)
- Dramatic notes : an illustrated year-book of the London stage (1881)
- Boys in the Mountains (1882)
- Boys Coastwise (1884)
- Thackeray's London (London, 1885)
- Young Folks' History of London (Boston, 1885)
- A Little Upstart (1885)
- The Boyhood of Living Authors (1887)
- The Captured Cunarder (1896)
- At Hawarden with Mr. Gladstone and other transatlantic experiences (1896)
- Literary Life in London (1898)
- Stray Moments with Thackeray (1902)
- How Tyson Came Home (1904)
- Many Celebrities and a Few Others (1912)
- George Washington (1919)
