= Andrew Halliday (journalist) =

Scottish journalist and dramatist

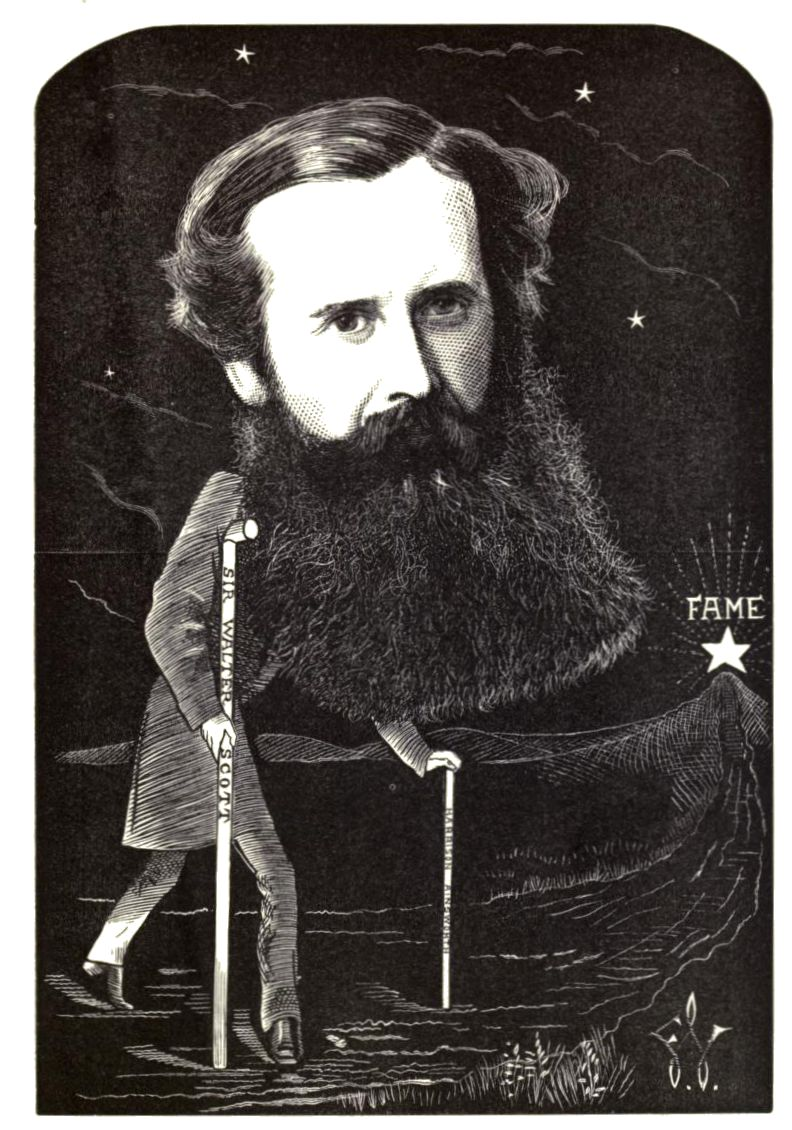
Andrew Halliday by Frederick Waddy (1872)

Andrew Halliday (born Andrew Halliday Duff; 1830 – 10 April 1877) was a Scottish journalist and dramatist.

== Biography ==
Andrew Halliday Duff was born at the Grange, Marnoch (near Huntly), Banffshire, early in 1830, was son of the Rev. William Duff, M.A., minister, of Grange, Banffshire, 1821–44, who died 23 September 1844, aged 53, by his wife Mary Steinson. Andrew was educated at the Marischal College and the University of Aberdeen.

=== Journalism ===
On moving to London in 1849 he was for some time connected with the Morning Chronicle, the Leader, the People's Journal, and other periodicals. He soon became known as a writer, and discarded the name of Duff. In 1851 he wrote the article Beggars in Henry Mayhew's London Labour and the London Poor. His work having attracted the notice of Thackeray, he was invited to write for the Cornhill Magazine, and was a constant contributor to All the Year Round. To the latter periodical he furnished a series of essays from 1861 onwards, which were afterwards collected into volumes entitled Everyday Papers, Sunnyside Papers, and Town and Country. His article in All the Year Round called My Account with Her Majesty was reprinted by order of the postmaster-general, and more than half a million copies circulated.

=== Drama ===
As one of the founders and president of the Savage Club in 1857, he was active in dramatic writing, and on Boxing night 1858, in conjunction with Frederick Lawrence, produced at the Strand Theatre a burlesque entitled Kenilworth, which ran upwards of one hundred nights, and was followed by a travesty of Romeo and Juliet. In partnership with William Brough he then wrote the Pretty Horsebreaker, the Census, the Area Belle, and several other farces.

In domestic drama he was the author of Daddy Gray, the Loving Cup, Checkmate, and Love's Dream, pieces produced with much success by Miss Oliver at the Royalty Theatre. The Great City, a piece put on the stage at Drury Lane on 22 April 1867, although not remarkable for the plot or dialogue, hit the public taste and ran 102 nights. The opening piece at the new Vaudeville Theatre, London, 16 April 1870, For Love or Money, was written by Halliday. He also was the writer of a series of dramas adapted from the works of well-known authors. These pieces were: Little Em'ly, Olympic Theatre, 9 October 1869, which ran two hundred nights; Amy Robsart, Drury Lane, 24 September 1870; Nell, Olympic Theatre, 19 November; Notre Dame, Adelphi Theatre, 10 April 1871; Rebecca, Drury Lane, 23 September; Hilda, Adelphi, 1 April 1872; The Lady of the Lake, Drury Lane, 21 September; and Heart's Delight, founded on Dickens Dombey and Son, Globe Theatre, 17 December 1873. After visiting Australia James Robertson Anderson appeared in 1874 at Drury Lane as Richard I in Halliday's adaption of Sir Walter Scott's novel The Talisman.

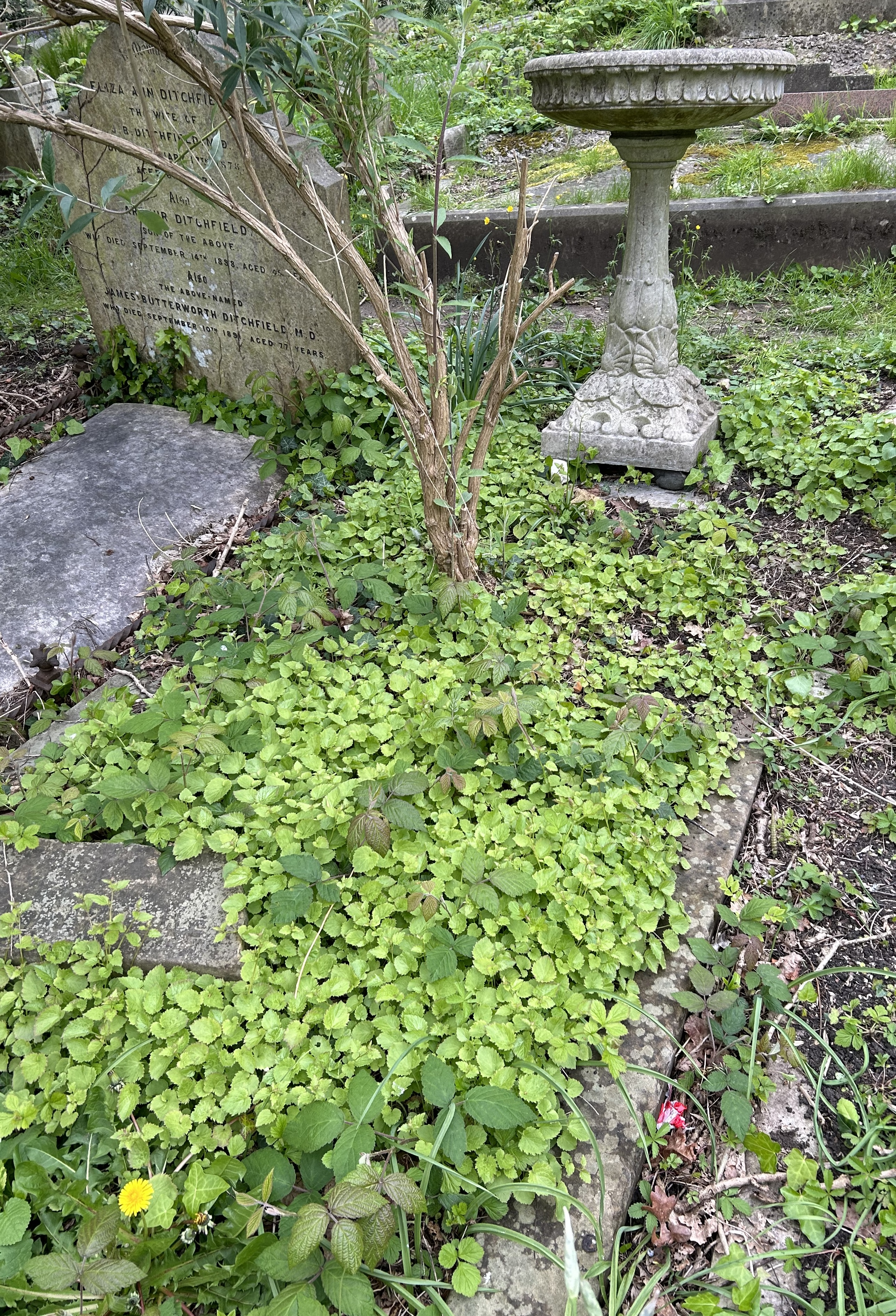
Grave of Andrew Halliday in Highgate Cemetery

He possessed a remarkable talent for bringing out the salient points of a novel, and his adaptations were successful where others failed. Charles Dickens warmly approved the construction of Little Em'ly. From 1873 Halliday suffered from softening of the brain.

He died at 74 St. Augustine's Road, Camden Town, London, 10 April 1877, and was buried in Highgate cemetery on 14 April.

== Printed works ==
His works include

1. The Adventures of Mr. Wilderspin in his Journey through Life, 1860.
2. Everyday Papers, 1864, 2 vols.
3. Sunnyside Papers, 1866.
4. Town and Country Sketches, 1866.
5. The Great City, a novel, 1867.
6. The Savage Club Papers, 1867 and 1868, edited by A. Halliday, 2 vols.
7. Shakespeare's tragedy of Antony and Cleopatra, arranged by A. Halliday, 1873.

In Lacy's Acting Edition of Plays, the following pieces were printed: in vol. xliii. Romeo and Juliet travestie, and in vol. lxxxv. Checkmate, a farce. The farces by William Brough and A. Halliday were: In vol. l. the Census, in vol. li. the Pretty Horsebreaker, in vol. lv. A Shilling Day at the Great Exhibition and the Colleen Bawn settled at last, in vol. lvii. A Valentine, in vol. lx. My Heart's in the Highlands, in vol. lxii. the Area Belle, in vol. lxiii. the Actor's Retreat, in vol. lxiv. Doing Banting, in vol. lxv. Going to the Dogs, in vol. lxvi. Upstairs and Downstairs, in vol. lxvii. Mudborough Election. Kenilworth, a comic extravaganza, by A. Halliday and F. Lawrence, and Checkmate, a comedy, were also printed. In a publication called Mixed Sweets, 1867, Halliday wrote About Pantomimes, pp. 43–54.
