= Dulcamara, or the Little Duck and the Great Quack =

Opera burlesque by W.S. Gilbert

Belcore woos Adina: illustration of Donizetti's L'Elisir d'Amore burlesqued by Gilbert in 1866

Dulcamara, or the Little Duck and the Great Quack, is one of the earliest plays written by W.S. Gilbert, his first solo stage success. The work is a musical burlesque of Donizetti's L'Elisir d'Amore, and the music was arranged by Mr. Van Hamme. It opened at the St James's Theatre on 29 December 1866, the last item in a long evening, following a farce and Dion Boucicault's new play Hunted Down. Dulcamara ran for a successful 120 nights.

The popularity of the piece encouraged further commissions for opera burlesques from Gilbert, who wrote four more between 1867 and 1869. Dulcamara and its successors all comply with the burlesque traditions of the day, with dialogue in rhyming couplets, convoluted puns throughout, and an array of attractive actresses in tights or short skirts, playing male roles, a practice Gilbert renounced as soon as he was sufficiently influential in the theatre.

== Background and production ==
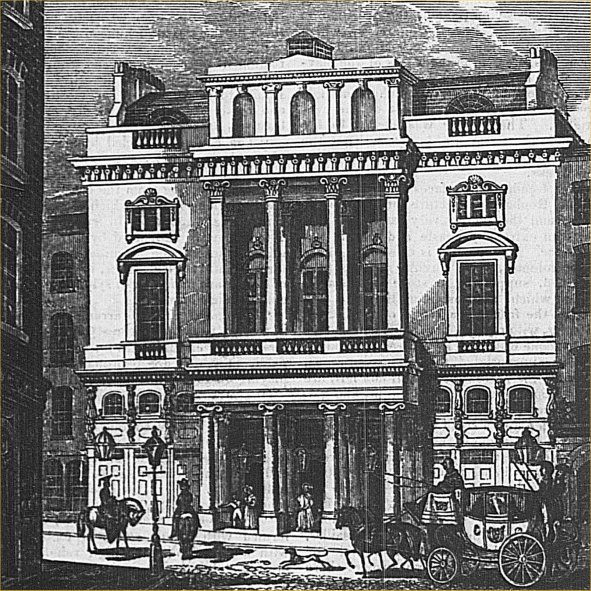
St. James's Theatre, where Dulcamara was premiered

In 1865–66, Gilbert collaborated with Charles Millward on several pantomimes, including one called Hush-a-Bye, Baby, On the Tree Top, or, Harlequin Fortunia, King Frog of Frog Island, and the Magic Toys of Lowther Arcade (1866). Gilbert's first solo success, however, came a few days after Hush-a-Bye Baby premiered. Ruth Herbert, the manager of London's St James's Theatre asked Tom Robertson to supply her with a new work for Christmas, 1866. Robertson was unable to produce the work in the two weeks allotted but suggested that Gilbert could do it.

The choice of the subject and the musical numbers was Gilbert's. He had been familiar with Donizetti operas from his boyhood; his father's translation of Lucia di Lammermoor had been presented in London, and there had long been parodies staged of that opera and of Linda di Chamounix and Lucrezia Borgia. In burlesquing L'elisir d'amore, Gilbert retained the characters of the original, inventing only one new principal character, Beppo, assistant (and, as it turns out, long-lost mother) to Dulcamara. Nor did Gilbert stray far from the plot of the original, although Donizetti's elixir of love – cheap claret – is changed to "Madame Rachel's 'Beautiful for Ever'" face cream.

The work was written and rehearsed in ten days, and the roles were filled by the stars of the theatre, including Ellen McDonnell (Nemorino), Frank Matthews (Dulcamara), Carlotta Addison (Adina) and Gaston Murray (Tomaso), with a Mr. Van Hamme as musical director. The young Henry Irving was the stage director. It was presented as an afterpiece to Boucicault's play Hunted Down and a one-act farce by John Maddison Morton called Newington Butts! Dulcamara ran for approximately 120 performances. Gilbert later wrote:

The piece ... met with more success than it deserved, owing, mainly, to the late Mr. Frank Matthews' excellent impersonation of the title role. In the hurry of production there had been no time to discuss terms, but after it had been successfully launched, Mr. Emden (Miss Herbert's acting manager) asked me how much I wanted for the piece. I modestly hoped that, as the piece was a success, thirty pounds would not be considered an excessive price for the London right. Mr. Emden looked rather surprised, and, as I thought, disappointed. However, he wrote a cheque, asked for a receipt, and when he had got it, said, "Now, take a bit of advice from an old stager who knows what he is talking about: never sell so good a piece as this for thirty pounds again." And I never have.

The libretto is set in rhyming couplets, as are the other Gilbert burlesques. The character Tomaso explains this odd convention near the close of Scene 1:

You're in a village during harvest time,
Where all the humblest peasants talk in rhyme,
And sing about their pleasures and cares
In parodies on all the well-known airs.
They earn their bread by going in a crowd,
To sing their humble sentiments aloud,
In choruses of striking unanimity –
(aside) The only rhyme I know to that, is dimity.
(aloud) They never wear umbrellas – so they get
Their dresses of watered silk – or else well wet.
Their dresses of drawing rooms is emblematic
Although their mode of life is upper-attic!

This scene is based on one in Gilbert's short story, "The Adventures of Wheeler J. Calamity", which he had written for the Fun Christmas Number in 1865, with the song following this speech, "If you intend to stay with us, before you've been a day with us", appearing in both.

== Reception and impact ==
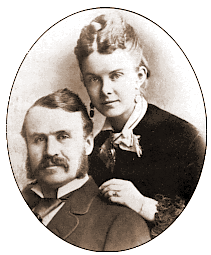
Gilbert and his wife, Lucy, in 1867

Dulcamara was not widely reviewed, but Fun magazine – to which Gilbert was a regular contributor – gave it a long and favourable notice, declaring that "Mr W. S. Gilbert at once takes rank for both neatness of construction and brilliancy of dialogue beside Mr. Byron. The position is an enviable one, and many have striven for years to achieve what Mr. Gilbert has done with his first burlesque." The London Review also praised Gilbert's work, noted that one number received a double encore, and commented on Gilbert's musical discrimination (something he was wont to disclaim in his later years): "The music is selected with a keen ear for lively and taking melodies." The Daily News wrote: "It is rare to find the first work of an author new to dramatic literature well constructed, free from redundancy, short, sharp, and to the point, clearly telling what little story it has to tell, and giving fair opportunities for the display of varied comic acting. Mr. Gilbert's burlesque ... possesses all these merits, and is remarkable for the wit and brilliance of its dialogue."

Dulcamara's success showed that Gilbert could write entertainingly in the burlesque form and quickly led to commissions to write four additional opera burlesques (the most successful of which was Robert the Devil in 1868) and a half dozen pantomimes and farces. These early burlesques, full of "ingenious but excruciating" puns (traditional in burlesques of the period), show signs of the satire that would later be a defining part of Gilbert's work. His parodic pokes at grand opera continued to be seen in the Savoy operas. Gilbert's early burlesques were considered unusually tasteful, compared with the others on the London stage, and he would depart even further from the burlesque style after 1869, with plays containing original plots and fewer puns. These included his "fairy comedies", such as The Palace of Truth (1870) and Pygmalion and Galatea (1871), and his German Reed Entertainments, which led to the famous Gilbert and Sullivan operas. Gilbert further developed the Dulcamara tale in The Sorcerer (1877) and The Mountebanks (1892), which draws heavily on the idea of a magic substance that transforms people.

The songs were probably available only in sheet music form, and because they pastiched popular or well-known songs, no vocal score reflecting the show was ever published. Dulcamara was revived twice in the nineteenth century but was absent from the stage for the entire twentieth century. It was adapted in 2005, with additional lyrics by John Spartan and new music by Scott Farrell, and their version is the only available performing edition. The chorus "If you intend to stay with us" was performed in 2005, and the "Fantasia on Themes from Dulcamara" (an orchestral piece) was performed in 2006, both at Rock Valley College in Rockford, Illinois. Musical selections from this version of the score were performed on 17 and 18 October 2008 in concert performances by the Rockford Operetta Party.

== Roles and original cast ==
- Nemorino, a Neapolitan peasant, of whom you will hear more peasantly – Miss E. McDonnell
- Belcore, a sergeant of the Infantry, who is "cut out" for a good soldier by nature – and by Nemorino – F. Charles
- Dr. Dulcamara, a travelling Quack Lecturer, who drives his own trap, and therefore is less of Mary Walker than a Chariotte-Ann Rider – Frank Matthews
- Beppo, his "Jack-pudding" – a mystery, whose real nature is concealed by a mysterious "Pike-crust" – J. D. Stoyle
- Tomaso, a Notary, keeping company with Gianetta: "Tomaso, and Tomaso, and Tomaso, creeps with his pretty pay-sanne" – Shakespeare – Gaston Murray
- Adina, the little Duck, who, it is hoped, will nevertheless be found to be very long in the bill – Carlotta Addison
- Gianetta, the pretty paysanne, to whom Tomaso "pays an" overwhelming amount of attention – Eleanor Bufton
- Catarina, an exquisite villager – Miss Marion
- Maria, another – Miss Gunness
- Soldiers, Male and Female Peasants, Fisher Girls, etc.

== Synopsis ==
Scene One opens on the exterior of Adina's farm. All the village girls are gathered around Tomaso, who is relating some gossip and village scandal. Tomaso reveals that Adina has made spiteful remarks about the other girls, much to their indignation. Adina promptly appears and sends the girls away. She is quickly pursued by Nemorino, who vainly presses his suit for her, but she will have none of it. Drums and trumpets are heard as Belcore and his regiment enter the village. The corps has come on holiday leave, and Belcore quickly catches Adina's eye, much to Nemorino's annoyance.

Scene Two is set in the interior of Nemorino's home. Belcore is presently Nemorino's lodger, while the soldiers are in town, and Nemorino has done all sorts of misdeeds to irritate his unwelcome houseguest. Belcore has become engaged to Adina in the past week, and Nemorino schemes to be rid of the soldier.

Scene Three opens as Doctor Dulcamara rides into town. Assisted by Beppo, he endeavours to sell his many wares to the public. Nemorino and the men ask the doctor for his help in winning back their sweethearts, since all the girls in town are attracted to the soldiers. Dulcamara sells his far-famed Elixir, titled "Madame Rachel's Beautiful For Ever", and gives the men instructions on its application. When everyone has gone, Beppo reveals that he has a secret and is not the drivelling idiot he pretends to be. Later, Nemorino is caught singing by Adina and Belcore, who continue to chastise him. Nemorino swears that he will reclaim her.

Scene Four begins with Beppo trying to reveal his secret, but Nemorino interrupts him. Nemorino needs more money to buy the potion again, so he asks Beppo for a loan. Beppo lets the mask fall and tells Nemorino he has a secret to tell, but is interrupted yet again when others arrive. Adina and Belcore are on their way to the wedding banquet, and Tomaso hopes to be fed before they sign the papers, though the free meal won't count toward his fee. In a last attempt, Nemorino asks Belcore for a loan and ends up enlisting for the Queen's shilling.

Scene Five begins with the girls bemoaning that their men have all enlisted in the soldiery. The girls would go to them but they are afraid of rejection. The men spend their enlistment money on Dulcamara's potion, which they apply to their faces. Adina enters and wonders if she made the wrong choice in accepting Belcore's engagement. When she sees Nemorino, she attempts to console him, and he (at last) wins her heart. Belcore catches them together, but now it's Nemorino's turn to send the other man away. The potion has worked quite well for everyone, as Dulcamara reveals his potion to everyone. It is eventually discovered that Adina is Dulcamara's daughter and Nemorino's cousin, Belcore is Tomaso's son, Gianetta is Tomaso's granddaughter, and she is Belcore's lost daughter. Beppo finally reveals his secret – he is Dulcamara's long lost mother! They all agree to live together, and the comedy ends happily.

== Musical numbers ==
1. Duet (Nemorino and Adina) – "Do, do, Pity me" (to the tune of "Hot Corn")
2. Chorus of Villagers and Soldiers – "Belcore comes marching home again" (to the tune of "When Johnny Comes Marching Home")
3. Song (Belcore) – "For this welcome, unrivalled in story" (to the tune of "La tremenda ultrice spada" From I Capuleti e i Montecchi by Vincenzo Bellini)
4. Quintette and Chorus (Nemorino, Gianetta, Adina, Tomaso, and Belcore) – "If you intend to stay with us, before you've been a day with us" (to the tune of "The Sugar Shop")
5. Trio (Adina, Belcore, Nemorino) – "Marry me, carry me, off we go, my hand Belcore take!" (to the tune of "Harum-Scarum Galop")
6. Song (Dulcamara and Chorus) – "Dulcamara's come to town!" (to the tune of "Hunkey Dorum")
7. Song (Dulcamara and Chorus) – "Buy my goods, as I'm advising" (to the tune of "Io son ricco" from L'Elisir d'Amore)
8. Duet (Nemorino, Dulcamara, and Chorus – "Our lovers all desert us for these military swells" (to the tune of "Champagne Charley is my name")
9. Song and Chorus (Nemorino) – "Oh, happiness is in our reach" (to the tune of March trio from Ching-Chow-Hi (Ba-ta-clan) by Jacques Offenbach)
10. Trio (Nemorino, Belcore, and Adina) – "Right away I'll tod-tod-tod-tod-toddle" (to the tune of "Esulti per la barbara" from L'Elisir d'Amore)
11. Concerted Quartette (Adina, Nemorino, Beppo, and Belcore – The four Airs to be sung together) – "She'll wed today I plainly see" (to the tunes of "Alpen Horn", "Gentil Hussard", "Polly Hopkins", and "Buy–a Broom")
12. Duet (Nemorino and Beppo) – "My woeful tale will make you quail" (to the tune of "The Nerves")
13. Quintette (Adina, Belcore, Tomaso, Gianetta, and Dr. Dulcamara) – "We are all to be married today" (to the tune of "I vowed that I never would leave her")
14. Duet (Belcore and Nemorino) – "Well, thanks to you I've got the tin" (to the tune of "Jog along Boys")
15. Trio (Tomaso, Gianetta, and Catarina) – "Now maidens all, these youngsters tall" (to the tune of "Lin and Tin")
16. Quartette (Dulcamara, Nemorino, Beppo, and Tomaso) – "Such a change was never known" (to the tune of "Old Sarah Walker")
17. Trio (Adina, Belcore, Nemorino) – "Don't it occur that you rather intrude?" (to the tune of "The Mousetrap Man" by R. Hughes)
18. Duet (Beppo and Dulcamara) – "I've a secret for to whisper" (to the tune of "The Frog in Yellow")
19. Finale – "Any man a girl may fix, sir" (to the tune of the Bell Chorus from Alessandro Stradella, an 1837 opera by Friedrich von Flotow)
