= Victorian burlesque =

Theatrical genre

Souvenir programme

Victorian burlesque, sometimes known as travesty or extravaganza, is a genre of theatrical entertainment that was popular in Victorian England and in the New York theatre of the mid-19th century. It is a form of parody in which a well-known opera or piece of classical theatre or ballet is adapted into a broad comic play, usually a musical play, usually risqué in style, mocking the theatrical and musical conventions and styles of the original work, and often quoting or pastiching text or music from the original work. Victorian burlesque is one of several forms of burlesque.

Like ballad opera, burlesques featured musical scores drawing on a wide range of music, from popular contemporary songs to operatic arias, although later burlesques, from the 1880s, sometimes featured original scores. Dance played an important part, and great attention was paid to the staging, costumes and other spectacular elements of stagecraft, as many of the pieces were staged as extravaganzas. Many of the male roles were played by actresses as breeches roles, to show off women's legs in tights, and some of the older female roles were taken by male actors.

Originally short, one-act pieces, burlesques were later full-length shows, occupying most or all of an evening's programme. Authors who wrote burlesques included J. R. Planché, H. J. Byron, G. R. Sims, F. C. Burnand, W. S. Gilbert and Fred Leslie.

== History ==
Burlesque theatre became popular around the beginning of the Victorian era. The word "burlesque" is derived from the Italian burla, which means "ridicule or mockery". According to the Grove Dictionary of Music and Musicians, Victorian burlesque was "related to and in part derived from pantomime and may be considered an extension of the introductory section of pantomime with the addition of gags and 'turns'." Another antecedent was ballad opera, in which new words were fitted to existing tunes.

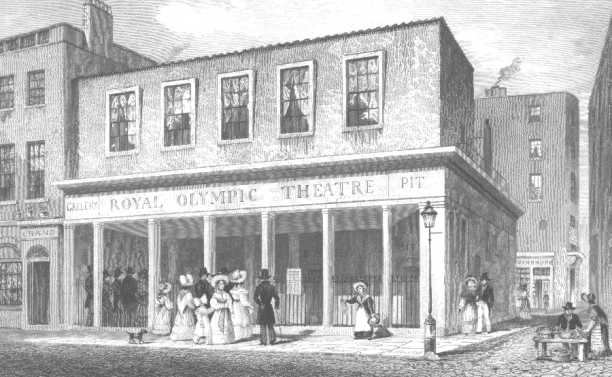
The Olympic Theatre, for which Planché wrote Olympic Revels

Madame Vestris produced burlesques at the Olympic Theatre beginning in 1831 with Olympic Revels by J. R. Planché. In these pieces, comedy stemmed from the incongruity and absurdity of the grand classical subjects, with realistic historical dress and settings, being juxtaposed with the everyday modern activities portrayed by the actors. For example, Olympic Revels opens with the gods of Olympus in classical Greek dress playing whist. In the early burlesques, the words of the songs were written to popular music, as had been done earlier in The Beggar's Opera. Later in the Victorian era, burlesque mixed operetta, music hall and revue, and some of the large-scale burlesque spectacles were known as extravaganzas. The English style of burlesque was successfully launched in New York in the 1840s by the manager and comedian William Mitchell, who had opened his Olympic Theatre in December 1839. Like the London prototypes, his burlesques included characters with nonsensical names such as Wunsuponatyme and The King of Neverminditsnamia, and made fun of all kinds of music currently being presented in the city.

Unlike pantomime, which aimed at all ages and classes, burlesque was aimed at a narrower, highly literate audience; some writers, such as the Brough brothers, aimed at a conservative middle class audience, and H. J. Byron's success was attributed to his skill in appealing to the lower middle classes. Some of the most frequent subjects for burlesque were the plays of Shakespeare and grand opera. From the 1850s onwards, burlesquing of Italian, French and, later in the century, German opera was popular with London audiences. Verdi's Il trovatore and La traviata received their British premieres in 1855 and 1856 respectively; British burlesques of them followed quickly. Our Lady of the Cameleon by Leicester Silk Buckingham and Our Traviata by William F. Vandervell (both 1857) were followed by five different burlesque treatments of Il trovatore, two of them by H. J. Byron: Ill Treated Trovatore, or the Mother the Maiden and the Musicianer (1863) and Il Trovatore or Larks with a Libretto (1880). The operas of Bellini, Bizet, Donizetti, Gounod, Handel, Meyerbeer, Mozart, Rossini, Wagner and Weber were burlesqued. In a 2003 study of the subject, Roberta Montemorra Marvin noted:

By the 1880s, almost every truly popular opera had become the subject of a burlesque. Generally appearing after an opera's premiere or following a successful revival, they usually enjoyed local production runs, often for a month or longer. The popularity of stage burlesque in general and operatic burlesque in particular seems to have stemmed from the many ways in which it entertained a diverse group, and the manner in which it fed and fed on the circus-like or carnivalesque atmosphere of public Victorian London.

W. S. Gilbert wrote five opera burlesques early in his career, beginning with Dulcamara, or the Little Duck and the Great Quack (1866), the most successful of which was Robert the Devil (1868). In the 1870s, Lydia Thompson's burlesque troupe, with Willie Edouin, became famous for their burlesques, by such authors as H. B. Farnie and Robert Reece, both in Britain and the U.S.

The Shakespeare scholar Stanley Wells notes that although parodies of Shakespeare had appeared even in Shakespeare's lifetime, the heyday of Shakespearean burlesque was the Victorian era. Wells observes that the typical Victorian Shakespeare burlesque "takes a Shakespeare play as its point of departure and creates from it a mainly comic entertainment, often in ways that bear no relation to the original play." Wells gives, as an example of the puns in the texts, the following: Macbeth and Banquo make their first entrance under an umbrella. The witches greet them with "Hail! hail! hail!": Macbeth asks Banquo, "What mean these salutations, noble thane?" and is told "These showers of 'Hail' anticipate your 'reign'". Musically, Shakespearean burlesques were as varied as the others of the genre. An 1859 burlesque of Romeo and Juliet contained 23 musical numbers, some from opera, such as the serenade from Don Pasquale, and some from traditional airs and popular songs of the day including "Buffalo Gals", and "Nix my Dolly".

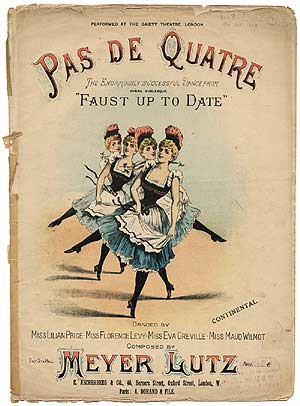
Sheet music from Faust up to Date

The dialogue for burlesques was generally written in rhyming couplets, or, less often, in other verse forms, such as blank verse; it was notable for its bad puns. For example, in Faust up to Date (1888), a couplet reads:

Mephistopheles: "Along the Riviera dudes her praises sing."
Walerlie: "Oh, did you Riviera such a thing?"

According to Grove, although "an almost indispensable element of burlesque was the display of attractive women dressed in tights, often in travesty roles ... the plays themselves did not normally tend to indecency." Some contemporary critics took a sterner view; in an 1885 article, the critic Thomas Heyward praised Planché ("fanciful and elegant") and Gilbert ("witty, never vulgar"), but wrote of the genre as a whole, "the flashy, 'leggy', burlesque, with its 'slangy' songs, loutish 'breakdowns', vulgar jests, paltry puns and witless grimacing at all that is graceful and poetic is simply odious. … Burlesque, insensate, spiritless and undiscriminating, demoralizes both the audience and the players. It debases the public taste." Gilbert expressed his own views on the worth of burlesque:

The question whether burlesque has a claim to rank as art is, I think, one of degree. Bad burlesque is as far removed from true art as is a bad picture. But burlesque in its higher development calls for high intellectual power on the part of its professors. Aristophanes, Rabelais, Geo Cruikshank, the authors of the Rejected Addresses, John Leech, Planché were all in their respective lines professors of true burlesque.

In his 1859 Longfellow burlesque Hi-A-Wa-Tha, the American playwright Charles Walcot encapsulated the character of burlesque in the epilogue, addressed to the audience by Mrs. John Wood as Minnehaha:

Ye who love extravaganza,
Love to laugh at all things funny,
Love the bold anachronism.
And the work of paste and scissors,
And "the unities" destruction,
Nigger airs, old glees, and catches,
Interspersed with gems of Op'ra,
Jokes and puns, good, bad, and so-so, –
Come and see this mutilation,
This disgraceful Hiawatha, Mongrel, doggerel Hiawatha!

In a similar vein, ten years later, Gilbert gave an English viewpoint on burlesque, in his epilogue to The Pretty Druidess:

So for burlesque I plead. Forgive our rhymes;
Forgive the jokes you've heard five thousand times;
Forgive each breakdown, cellar-flap, and clog,
Our low-bred songs – our slangy dialogue;
And, above all – oh, ye with double barrel –
Forgive the scantiness of our apparel!

== Gender reversal and female sexuality ==
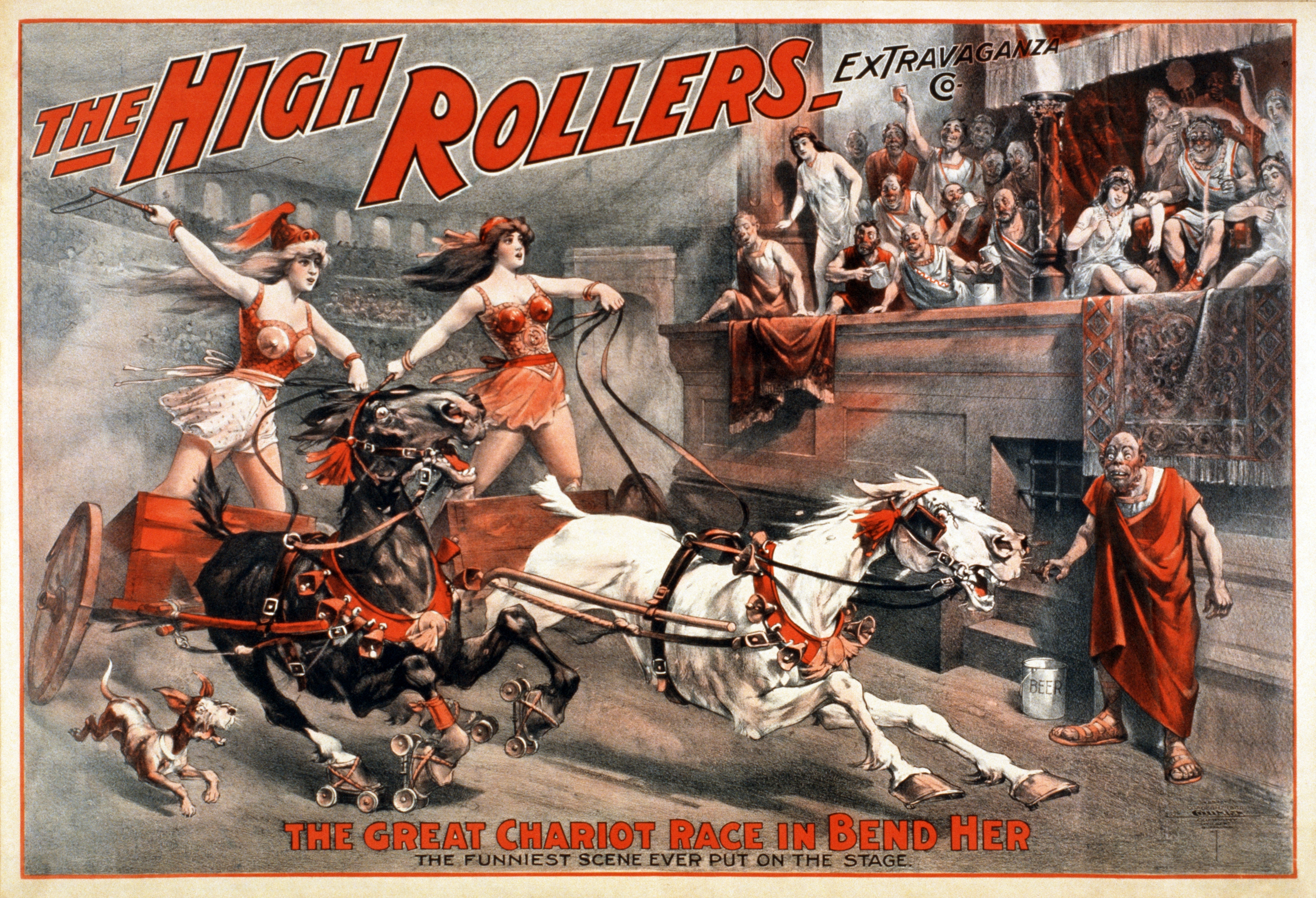
American burlesque on Ben Hur, c. 1900.

Actresses in burlesque would often play breeches roles, which were male roles played by women; likewise, men eventually began to play older female roles. These reversals allowed viewers to distance themselves from the morality of the play, focusing more on joy and entertainment than catharsis, a definitive shift away from neoclassical ideas.

The depiction of female sexuality in Victorian burlesque was an example of the connection between women as performers and women as sexual objects in Victorian culture. Throughout the history of theatre the participation of women on stage has been questioned. Victorian culture, according to Buszek in 2012, viewed paid female performance as being closely associated with prostitution, "a profession in which most women in the theatre dabbled, if not took on as a primary source of income".

== Gaiety Theatre ==
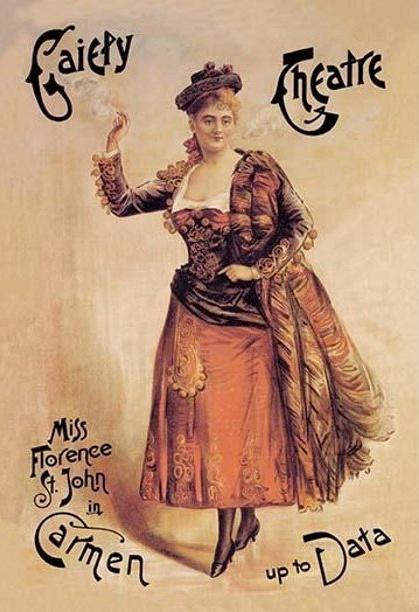
Florence St. John in Carmen up to Data

Burlesque became the specialty of London's Royal Strand Theatre and Gaiety Theatre from the 1860s to the early 1890s. In the 1860s and 1870s, burlesques were often one-act pieces running less than an hour and using pastiches and parodies of popular songs, opera arias and other music that the audience would readily recognize. Nellie Farren starred as the Gaiety Theatre's "principal boy" from 1868, and John D'Auban choreographed the burlesques there from 1868 to 1891. Edward O'Connor Terry joined the theatre in 1876. Early Gaiety burlesques included Robert the Devil (1868, by Gilbert), The Bohemian G-yurl and the Unapproachable Pole (1877), Blue Beard (1882), Ariel (1883, by F. C. Burnand) and Galatea, or Pygmalion Reversed (1883).

Beginning in the 1880s, when comedian-writer Fred Leslie joined the Gaiety, composers like Meyer Lutz and Osmond Carr contributed original music to the burlesques, which were extended to a full-length two- or three-act format. These later Gaiety burlesques starred Farren and Leslie. They often included Leslie's libretti, written under his pseudonym, "A. C. Torr", and were usually given an original score by Lutz: Little Jack Sheppard (1885), Monte Cristo Jr. (1886), Pretty Esmeralda (1887), Frankenstein, or The Vampire's Victim (1887), Mazeppa and Faust up to Date (1888). Ruy Blas and the Blasé Roué (1889) made fun of the play Ruy Blas by Victor Hugo. The title was a pun, and the worse the pun, the more Victorian audiences were amused. The last Gaiety burlesques were Carmen up to Data (1890), Cinder Ellen up too Late (1891), and Don Juan (1892, with lyrics by Adrian Ross).

In the early 1890s, Farren retired, Leslie died, and musical burlesque went out of fashion in London, as the focus of the Gaiety and other burlesque theatres changed to the new genre of Edwardian musical comedy. In 1896, Seymour Hicks declared that burlesque "is dead as a doornail and will never be revived." From her retirement, Nellie Farren endorsed this judgment.

== See also ==
- Extravaganza
- Parody
- Pastiche
- Travesti (theatre)
- Pantomime
