= Randall's Thumb =

Play by W. S. Gilbert

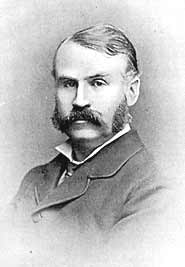
W. S. Gilbert, author of Randall's Thumb, circa 1870

Randall's Thumb is a play by W. S. Gilbert that premièred in 1871 at the opening of Marie Litton's Royal Court Theatre in London. Its plot, based on a short story that Gilbert had published the year before, relates how the forger Randall blackmails the innocent Buckthorpe for a crime he did not commit, hence putting him "under Randall's thumb". In the play, several characters pretend to be different from their real selves, a theme to be repeated in later works by Gilbert. The play received mixed reviews (ranging from "brilliant" to "a very dreadful mistake") but lasted for a successful 123 performances in its original London run.

Gilbert had already written a considerable body of stories, plays, poems, criticism and other works by the time he wrote Randall's Thumb. Its success led to an American production and to more Gilbert plays produced at the Royal Court Theatre. He would go on to write more successful plays and, between 1871 and 1896, the libretti to the popular series of Gilbert and Sullivan operas.

== Background ==
From the mid-1860s through the early 1870s, W. S. Gilbert was extremely productive, writing a large quantity of comic verse, theatre reviews and other journalistic pieces, short stories, and dozens of plays and comic operas. In 1871, he produced seven plays and operas. Gilbert's dramatic writing during this time was evolving from his early musical burlesques to a more restrained style, as exemplified in his string of blank-verse fairy comedies. The first of these was The Palace of Truth, which opened in 1870 to widespread acclaim. He was also developing his unique style of absurdist humour, described as "topsy-turvy" humour, made up of "a combination of wit, irony, topsyturvydom, parody, observation, theatrical technique, and profound intelligence". Randall's Thumb dates from the middle of this period, when Gilbert was trying different styles and working towards the mature style of his later work, including the extraordinarily successful series of Gilbert and Sullivan operas.

Marie Litton took over the proprietorship of the New Chelsea Theatre in 1871, hiring Walter Emden to remodel the interior, and renamed it the Royal Court. Its opening attraction was the première of Randall's Thumb on 25 January 1871. Gilbert wrote and rehearsed the play at the same time as another work, A Sensation Novel, which he opened only three days after Randall's Thumb at the Gallery of Illustration. In Randall's Thumb, several characters play roles that differ from reality: newlyweds pretend to be long married, and an old married couple pretend to be newlyweds. The contrast between appearance and reality is a theme to which Gilbert returned many times in his later work. Another favourite Gilbert theme in this piece is the idea that gentlemanly behaviour triumphs "through the love of a virtuous woman".

When Randall's Thumb proved successful (running for 100 performances in its original London run), it was no surprise, as the London Echo pointed out, that Litton followed it with another work by Gilbert. This work was Creatures of Impulse, which opened on 2 April 1871 as a companion piece for Randall's Thumb. Litton continued to commission works from Gilbert, including Gilbert's adaptation of Charles Dickens' Great Expectations in 1871, Broken Hearts in 1875, various translations of French works, and The Happy Land in 1873, which portrayed members of the British Government on stage and caused such a scandal that it had an unusually long run.

On 8 May 1871, Randall's Thumb opened in New York at Wallack's Theatre. The review in the following day's New York Times proclaimed it a "well-earned success", though the reviewer also ventured the criticism that Gilbert "knows the stage better than he knows the world", because the characters' actions and dialogue achieve dramatic effect while being "distinctly improbable" in the real world.

== Plot ==
=== Act I: Gardens of Beachington Hotel at a seaside resort ===
Young Buckthorpe was attacked by a stranger, while walking along the edge of Banton Cliffe, who struck him with a sword-cane; Buckthorpe defended himself, causing the attacker to fall from the cliff, then lost consciousness. His friend Randall encouraged him to flee the country over the presumed murder of his attacker, which he did, but Randall, a forger and confidence trickster, is now holding the threat of going to the police over Buckthorpe's head.

Randall had married an elderly woman for her money, but had to flee the country to avoid being arrested on a felony charge shortly thereafter. The woman kept the embarrassing marriage secret, and her will gave all her money to her niece when she died, but Randall claims that, as her will was made before the marriage, it was invalid, and all the money should go to him. However, to avoid scrutiny that might reveal his felony, he wants Buckthorpe to flirt with said niece and find out about the aunt, to allow Randall to conduct a plausible story about his marriage.

Randall and Buckthorpe's conversation is interrupted by the arrival of Dr. Trotway and his niece Edith Temple. Edith and Buckthorpe knew each other when Buckthorpe was serving in India, but her father forbade her to marry him. After their romance begins to rekindle, Randall steps in and reveals that Edith was the heiress that Buckthorpe was to flirt with. Buckthorpe tries to back out, but Randall threatens to go to the authorities, and Randall arranges for the helpless Buckthorpe to join the hotel's guests at a seaside picnic, to allow Buckthorpe to continue pressing Edith for information.

=== Act II: The Clump Rocks ===
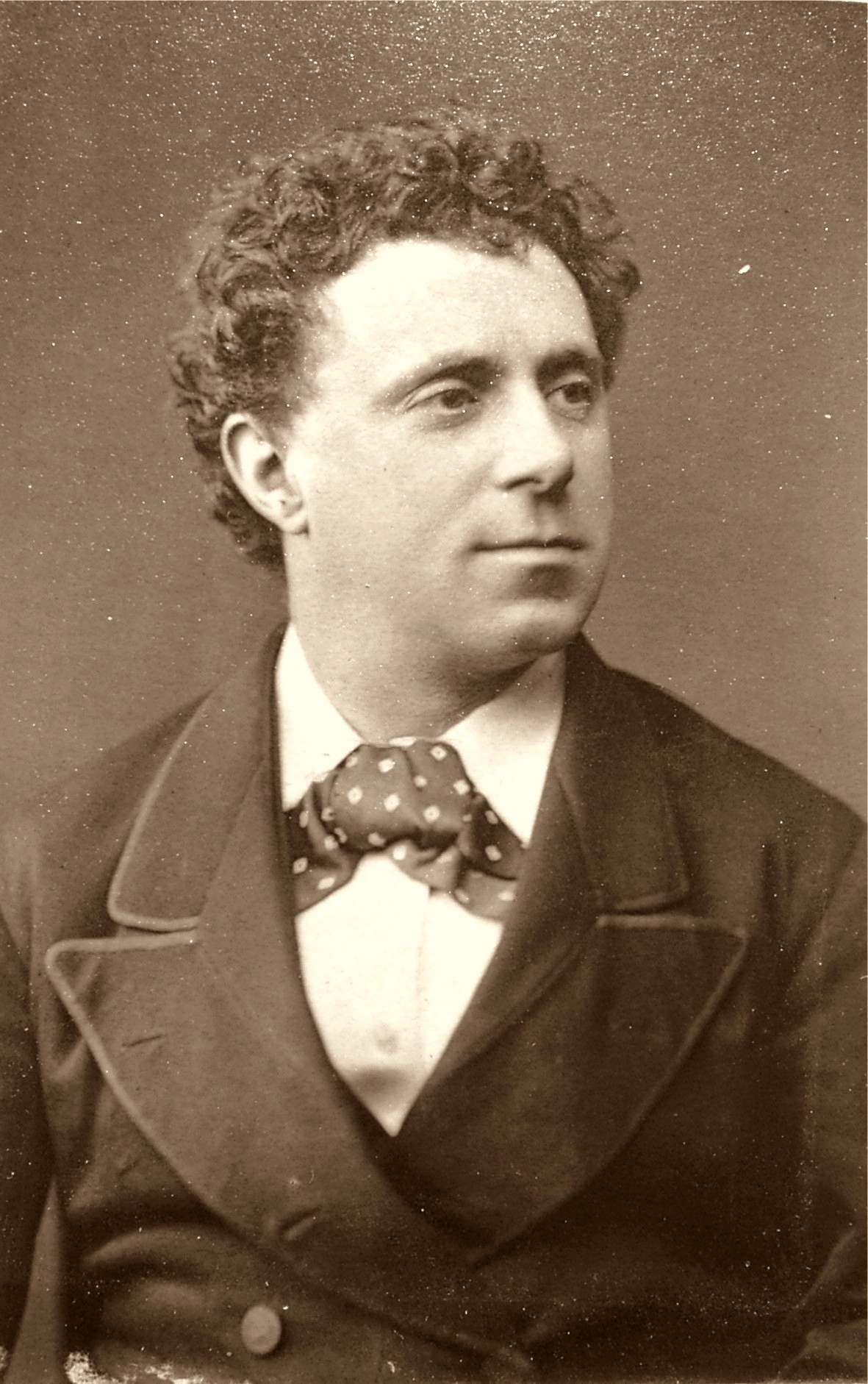
Edward Righton in his London debut as Joe Bangles in Randall's Thumb

On a rocky coast, Miss Spinn, an elderly spinster, directs servants to set up the picnic and flirts with Joe Bangles, a bachelor of about the same age. Bangles jokes around with her, and, as the others begin to arrive, he discovers himself having all but proposed to her. Randall is disliked by the group, but he eventually gets Miss Spinn to have pity on him, and she decides to flirt with him to make Bangles jealous. However, the tide will be coming in shortly, and the group begins to head in. Bangles stays behind a bit to talk to Dr. Trotway about Buckthorpe, who he finds a bit suspicious as he always seems to be meeting up with Edith, supposedly by chance.

In a private interview soon afterwards, Randall discovers that Buckthorpe has failed to gain any information about Randall's wife. He threatens Buckthorpe with the prospect of immediate revelation of his supposed crime should he not find out immediately. Randall hides behind a rock, Edith returns, and Buckthorpe begins to interview her. He soon finds himself unable to continue, and reveals Randall's true nature to her, at which point Randall leaves in disgust. Buckthorpe tells her of the blackmail scheme, and she offers to help him in any way she can. In a romantic scene, they pledge themselves to each other. Randall is furious and confronts Buckthorpe. His scheme is ruined, and he will shortly have to flee the town. He threatens to go to the police. Buckthorpe tells him to do so and rejects Randall, vowing to get out from under Randall's thumb, or face the consequences, but no longer to assist Randall in his schemes. Randall warns him that he had best take care, gives him until the next day to change his mind and get him what he wants, and leaves. Buckthorpe is terrified, but determines to remain firm.

Bangles, Miss Spinn, and Edith join Buckthorpe, but the sea comes in, trapping them on the rocks. Edith and Buckthorpe are quite happy to cling to each other, but Bangles is not pleased to be trapped on a small rock with Miss Spinn. Unfortunately, his confused, rambling attempt to ward off her romantic advances goes as follows:

BANGLES:	Miss Spinn, let us come to the point. It's an awkward thing to have to say to a lady, but I can't close my eyes to the fact that you seem to think that I – in short that – I propose to marry you.
MISS SPINN:	You do?
BANGLES:	(decidedly) I do!
MISS SPINN:	You propose to marry me? Oh, Joseph, how good you are to me!

Randall arrives in a boat, but is forced to rescue Bangles and Miss Spinn first, as they're on a lower rock about to be covered by sea. Edith and Buckthorpe are perfectly happy, and they reject Randall's help, choosing to stay together, isolated from the world.

=== Act III: Same as Act I ===
Bangles is a bit melancholy: He is an old family friend of Edith's, and, had he ever married, Edith would have been who he chose. Now Buckthorpe has won Edith's hand, however, and Miss Spinn is after his. However, he accepts the situation as best he can. Buckthorpe takes Bangles into his confidence about Randall's schemes and tells him about Randall's blackmail material against him. Bangles is rather horrified at the thought that Edith might be marrying a murderer, but Buckthorpe's protestations of innocence convince him to give Buckthorpe a chance. Bangles will tackle Randall and attempt to discover the truth of the matter from the evidence Randall holds, but should it go against Buckthorpe, he shall turn him over to the authorities.

Bangles confronts Randall, pointing out that knowing Buckthorpe is a murderer, but not turning him over to the authorities, makes him an accomplice after the fact. Randall tries to get out of turning over the evidence, for fear of being arrested himself. Bangles threatens to call the entire hotel to his aid, should Randall try to leave, and forces Randall to write a letter to the police, warning them that a notorious criminal with a warrant for his arrest is staying at the hotel. Bangles believes this will force the evidence of Buckthorpe's guilt out into the open if Randall actually has such proof. Randall attempts to flee, but the waiter stops him from leaving: Randall attempted to pay by cheque, and the manager believes that the cheque will bounce. Buckthorpe is now in a position of power: He gets Randall to give him the letters in exchange for money to pay the manager, then tackles Randall, delaying him until the police arrive.

Dr. Trotway and Bangles return and assist Buckthorpe in subduing Randall. Randall calls out about the letters, Buckthorpe, resolving to live honestly, hands them over to Trotway. This is enough to let Bangles realise the truth: He was the one who had attacked Buckthorpe, mistaking him for a robber, and Randall lied to Buckthorpe about him dying, the coroner's report, and all the other details that he has been holding over Buckthorpe's head. The police arrive and arrest Randall, who attempts to have one last act of revenge, revealing his marriage to Edith's aunt. However, Miss Spinn turns out to have been there for the marriage, and the woman he married was not Edith's aunt, but an accomplice of his.

The play ends happily: Miss Spinn has protected people Bangles cares about, and her explanation of how she knew shows him a new side to her, which reconciles him to their marriage. Buckthorpe is proven innocent and can marry Edith, who keeps her fortune.

In the version performed on its London opening night, Buckthorpe was revealed to be the long-lost son of a couple in the play; this revelation, unnecessary to the main plot, was cut from the play after this performance along with some other dialogue.

== Characters and original cast ==
Dr. Trotway	H. Mellon
Joe Bangles	Edward Righton
Randall, an Adventurer	W. Belford
Buckthorpe, under his thumb	Hermann Vezin
Mr. Scantlebury, on his honeymoon	Frank Matthews
Mr. Flamboys, an Old Stager	Mr. Astley
Cumming, a Waiter	Mr. Parry
Clench, a Superintendent of Police	Mr. Jarvis
Edith Temple, Dr. Trotway's Niece	Kate Bishop
Mrs. Scantlebury	Mrs. Stephens
Miss Spinn	Maggie Brennan
Mrs. Flamboys	Eleanor Bufton

== Reception ==
The review in The Times noted that Randall's Thumb was preceded by and followed farces, and also followed and an address in rhyme, "delivered with much eloquence by Mrs. Hermann Vezin". The reviewer was struck by the "extremely pretty scenery" and praised Gilbert's ability to connect all of the characters "ingeniously" in the involved plot as Randall's deceptions are discovered and Buckthorpe's fortunes blossom, commenting: "The dialogue is written with [Gilbert's] accustomed point, and he has taken great pains to exhibit varieties of marked character. His anxiety to form a large characteristic assembly has, indeed, led to an exuberance which will render necessary the curtailment of some of the earlier scenes, since the personages who sustain the interest of the play are sometimes thrown into the background by others, whose chief object is to show their own peculiarities. It should be observed, however, that as the piece progresses the interest is increased." The review reported that the audience gave enthusiastic calls for the author to come before the curtain.

== See also ==
- List of W. S. Gilbert dramatic works
