= Walter H. Fisher =

English singer and actor

Walter H. Fisher in W. S. Gilbert's The Happy Land in 1873

Walter Henry Fisher (1848 – 1 January 1893) was an English singer and actor of the Victorian era best remembered as the creator of the role of the Defendant in Gilbert and Sullivan's 1875 opera Trial by Jury. Beginning in the 1860s with much promise in comic plays, classics, Victorian burlesque, and as a versatile singer in opera and operetta, Fisher seemed headed for lasting stardom alongside his wife Lottie Venne. His career was limited, however, by his struggle with alcoholism, ending in the 1880s, and he died at age 44. Gustave Slapoffski described Fisher as "probably the finest comic opera tenor the English stage has ever known".

== Early life and career ==
Born in Clifton, Bristol, in 1848, Fisher was the middle of three children of Mary Ann née Powell (born 1817) and James Fisher (1812–1896), a miniature portrait artist and photographer. Fisher studied singing with Signor Catalani and was singing as a concert tenor by 1863, aged 15, in the Bristol Athenaeum. He went on to sing at local events, particularly with the Bristol Volunteer Artillery Corps Dramatique for whom he sometimes performed in drag in female roles, gaining a local reputation as both an excellent singer and actor. In 1866 in Bristol he performed in Guy Mannering as Henry Bertram, followed by other roles at that theatre, such as Laertes in Hamlet, Malcolm in Macbeth and Sir William Brandon in Richard III.

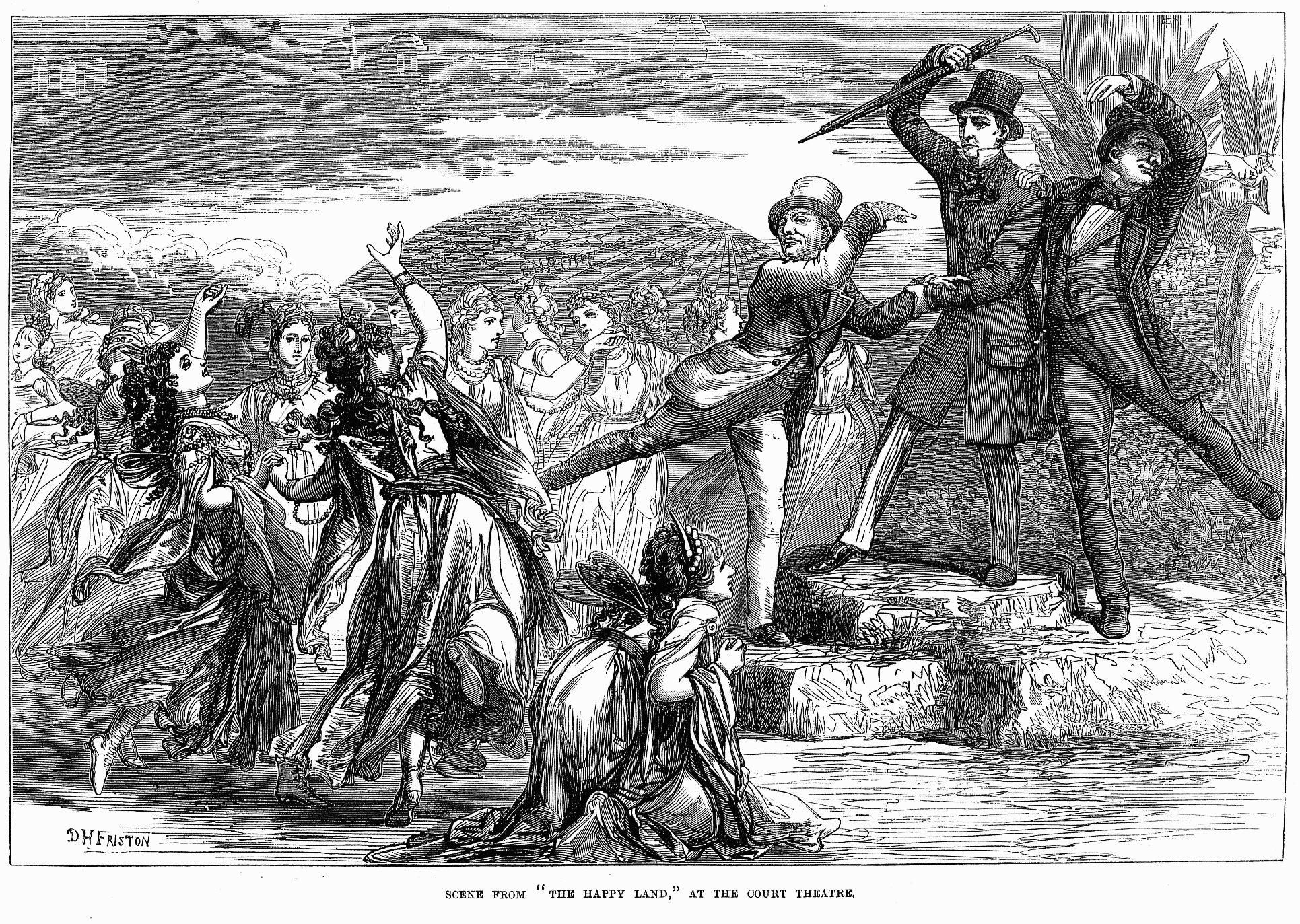
A scene from The Happy Land, showing Gladstone (Fisher), Lowe and Ayrton.

He began his professional stage career in 1868 at the Theatre Royal, Plymouth, in F. C. Burnand's burlesque Paris and as Rodolphe (Max) in Der Freischütz and then at the Theatre Royal, Brighton, as Don Ottavio in Little Don Giovanni, Lord Woodbie in The Flying Scud, Don John in Much Ado About Nothing and Osbaldistone in Rob Roy, among others, and still sang in concerts, including a performance of Haydn's Fifth Mass in Bristol. Soon afterwards, he joined Captain Disney Roebuck's touring company in classic plays (The School for Scandal, East Lynne, The Ticket-of-Leave Man, The Lady of Lyons, David Garrick and The Rivals), pantomime, burlesque and operetta, sometimes playing opposite his future wife, Lottie Venne. With Venne he went back to the Theatre Royal, after which, Fisher played in Glasgow and Nottingham. To distinguish himself from another Walter Fisher, in the early 1870s he adopted the middle name Henry. Fisher and Venne next appeared with Francis Farlie's burlesque company, for whom he appeared as Montpesson in Caste. At Nottingham they acted together in a burlesque of Chilpéric in which he played the King and Venne was Frédégonde. They remained at Nottingham into early 1872 and married on 20 March 1872.

== Peak years ==
Fisher first appeared in London in 1872 as Ambroise Valamour in Broken Spells at the Court Theatre, followed by other roles there, including Sergeant Klooque in a revival of W. S. Gilbert's Creatures of Impulse, opposite Venne's Peter. The next year, in the same house, he played the dual role of Ethais and The Right Honourable Mr. G, an impersonation of W. E. Gladstone, in Gilbert's burlesque The Happy Land. Fisher's interpretation of Gladstone was appreciated by audiences but was revised on the order of the Lord Chamberlain. Fisher continued to play in comedy roles at the Court and then with Henry Neville's company at the Olympic Theatre, but made his first London appearance in light opera as Marasquin in Giroflé-Girofla at the Philharmonic Theatre in 1874. The Observer wrote of his performance, "It was for him a hazardous task to essay a character which is identified with Mario Widmer, one of the most fascinating jeunes premieres at present on the stage: and it is gratifying to say that Mr. Fisher suffered little if at all by comparison". Fisher's good looks and pleasing voice had led him to a successful early career "at the Philharmonic, Royalty, Olympic and other theatres [where] he became the original exponent of many notable operatic and dramatic works by Messrs. Montague, James and Thorne, he was selected [to create] the part of Jack Wyatt (Two Roses) in the provinces." Punch magazine called him the "British José Dupuis".

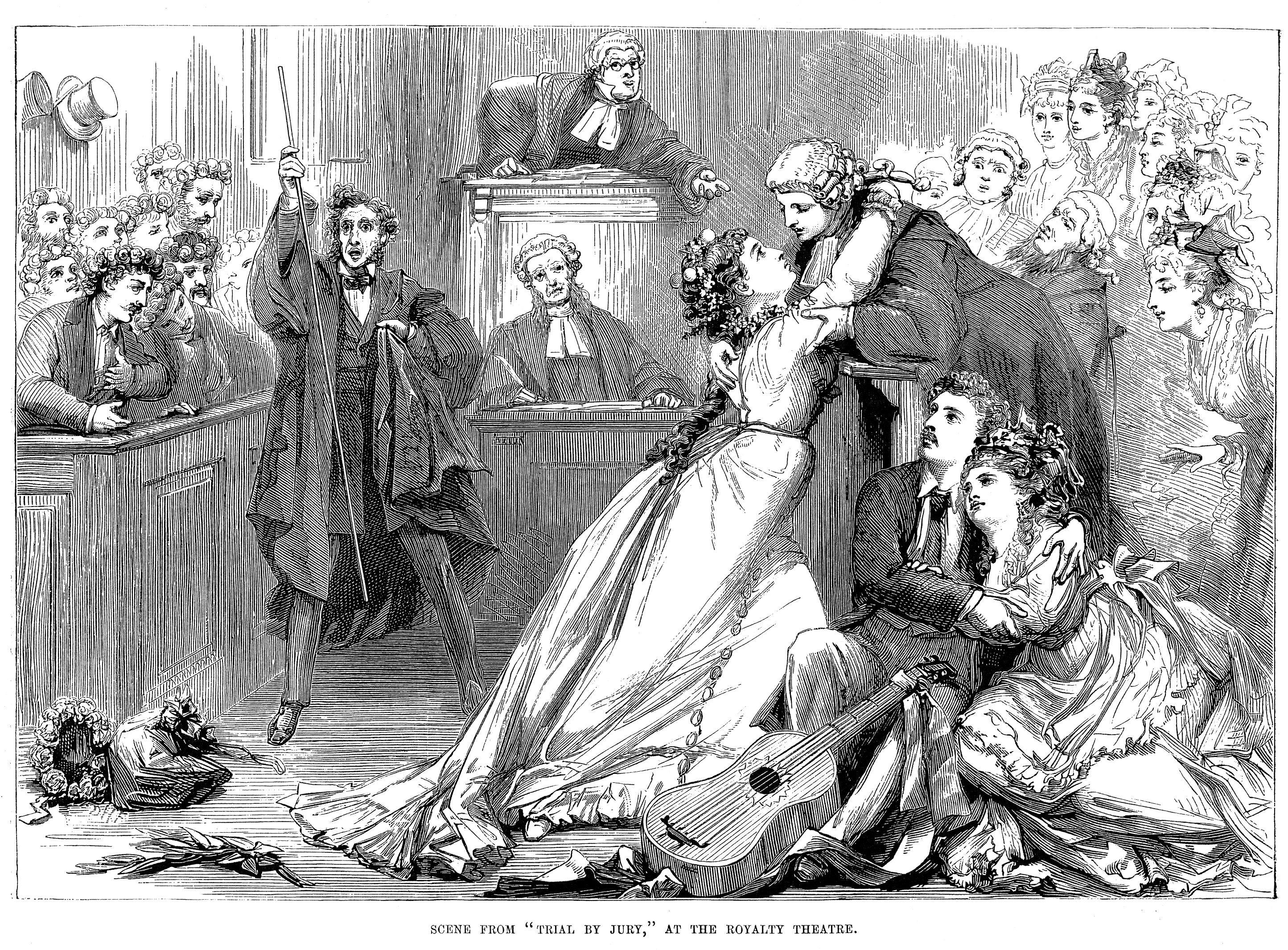
A scene from Trial by Jury. The Defendant (Fisher), with his guitar, clings to his new love.

Fisher joined Selina Dolaro's company at the Royalty Theatre in January 1875, where he played Piquillo, the tenor lead, in Jacques Offenbach's La Périchole. In March, when Richard D'Oyly Carte produced an accompanying piece there, Gilbert and Sullivan's Trial by Jury, Fisher was the original Defendant. Rutland Barrington later wrote of Fisher, "He had a charming and sympathetic voice, and was one of the very few tenors it has been my good fortune to meet who could act as well as sing." Fisher next returned to the Olympic, where he had another long run in The Gascon. In 1876, after another stint as The Defendant, he went on tour with Carte and Dolaro, repeating the roles of the Defendant and Piquillo and played Ange Pitou, the leading tenor role in La fille de Madame Angot, as well as the Costermonger in Carte's own one-act operetta, Happy Hampstead. During this engagement, however, he "became unreliable" (a euphemism for alcoholism) and, despite his "delightful" performances and good notices from the critics, Carte asked him to leave the company, as "the disease was too deeply rooted for permanent cure". Later in the year, however, he was back in London with Charles Wyndham at The Crystal Palace, then returned to the Olympic.

Fisher was engaged again by Carte in 1877 for Tita in Thibet as Brum opposite Kate Santley at the Royalty, where he also played the title role in Orpheus in the Underworld and reprised his role as the Costermonger in Happy Hampstead. In 1879 he was Hector in Madame Favart opposite Florence St. John at the Strand Theatre and on tour. In 1881, he toured in the title role of Billee Taylor, among other pieces, and appeared in Bristol with his old company. He then toured with Emily Soldene as Giletti in Madame l'archiduc and Fritz in La Grande-Duchesse de Gérolstein. Fisher created the role of Rev Henry Sandford in The Vicar of Bray at the Globe Theatre in 1882.

== Later years ==
Fisher toured with the D'Oyly Carte Opera Company in the baritone role of Archibald Grosvenor in Patience with Carte's principal touring company in the Autumn of 1883. He then apparently took more breaks from the stage before and after again appearing in Bristol for a time. He finally reappeared with a D'Oyly Carte touring company in 1887 and was soon playing other baritone roles, Captain Corcoran in H.M.S. Pinafore and Samuel in The Pirates of Penzance, on tour until June 1888. He then returned to tenor parts, touring as Frederic in Pirates and Nanki-Poo in The Mikado until September 1888. The next year, after a six-month hiatus, Fisher had his last engagement with a Carte touring company in June to November 1889 in The Yeomen of the Guard as Leonard Meryll, and filled in as Colonel Fairfax for the last week of the tour in December 1889. The Manchester Guardian called his Leonard, "excellent … a great improvement on what we have previously seen and heard in the part."

Fisher and Venne's children, Amy Hannah, later known as Audrey Ford Welch (1873–1942), and Henry James Fisher (born 1877) both became actors.

On 28 November 1892 Fisher was admitted to the Cleveland Street Infirmary at the Strand Union workhouse, where he died on 1 January 1893.
