= Lottie Venne =

English comic actress and singer (1849–1928)

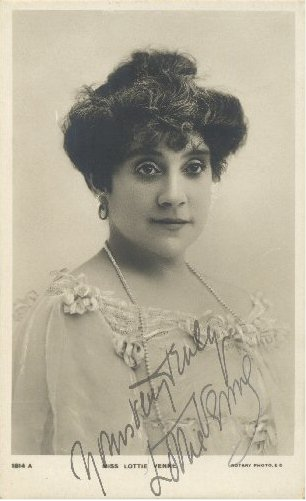
Lottie Venne in a Rotary postcard, c. 1910

Lottie Venne (28 May 1849 – 16 July 1928; born Hannah Charlotte Venn) was an English comic actress and singer of the Victorian and Edwardian eras, who enjoyed a theatre career spanning five decades. Venne began her stage career in musical burlesque before moving into farce and comedy. She appeared in several works by each of F. C. Burnand and W. S. Gilbert and was often in plays with Charles Hawtrey later in her career.

== Early life and career ==
Venne was born in Islington, London, to Benjamin Venn, a performer, and his wife Rebecca. Her first professional appearance came in 1867 as Miss Charbonnel in A Dream in Venice at the Gallery of Illustration in London, followed by two years touring in the provinces. For part of this time, she joined Captain Disney Roebuck's touring company, where she met her future husband, Walter H. Fisher. In London, in 1870, Venne played Susan Piper in A Bull in a China Shop, a comedy by Charles Mathews at the Haymarket Theatre. At the same theatre, she appeared as Jemima in Rural Felicity by John Baldwin Buckstone. In the early 1870s, she played many roles in musical burlesques such as Francis Talfourd's Atalanta as Cupid, Little Jack Sheppard as Jonathan Wild (1871 on tour), Dr. Faust as Franz, Ixion as Cupid (1873), and Don Juan as Zerlina (1873 at the Alhambra Theatre). She played Polly Twinkle in La Vie parisienne in 1872, and, at the Court Theatre, played in Christabel, Zampa, Lady Audley's Secret and others.

Venne played the role of Zayda in the 1873 play The Happy Land by W. S. Gilbert and Gilbert Arthur à Beckett at the Court Theatre, together with Fisher. The same year, in the same house, she appeared in Playing with Fire. In 1874, she joined the company at the Strand Theatre, where she first played Lady Constance in The Field of the Cloth of Gold. She remained at that theatre for four years in burlesques and comedies, such as Nemesis by H. B. Farnie, Loo and the Party Who Took Miss, Intimidad, Flamingo, Cracked Heads (1876, a parody of Gilbert's Broken Hearts) by Arthur Clements and Frederick Hay, The Lying Dutchman, Princess Toto by Gilbert and Frederic Clay, Champagne, and as the Plaintiff in Gilbert and Sullivan's Trial by Jury in 1877, opposite Fisher's Defendant. Also at the Strand, she played Penelope, the bewildered housemaid, in Sydney Grundy's comedy The Snowball and appeared in Our Club and The Baby.

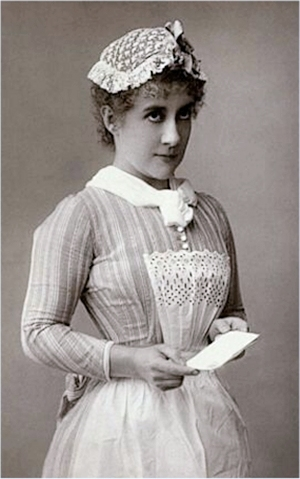
Venne in 1889

She built her popularity through a series of roles in works by F. C. Burnand, including Dora and Diplunacy, a burlesque of Diplomacy (in which she parodied Effie Bancroft), Family Ties and The Red Rover (a burlesque of Robertson's sentimental plays). In 1879, at the Royalty Theatre, she played Eliza in a revival of The Zoo by B. C. Stephenson and Arthur Sullivan. The same year, she was particularly successful playing the title role in Burnand's farce Betsy at the Criterion Theatre. This was followed by comic roles such as Amy Jones in Crutch and Toothpick by G. R. Sims at the Royalty (1879), and by roles in Young Mrs. Winthrop, and On Change. She also played the title role in Jane. In 1880, she was Kitty Clark in The Little Mother at the Gaiety Theatre, London.

Venne appeared in the 1881 comedy Out of the Hunt at the Comedy Theatre with E. H. Sothern. The same year, she played Mrs. Pilate Pump in Blue and Buff, Mrs. Delafield in Reclaimed and Gwendolyn Kingfisher in Dust. In 1882, she was Nettie Milsom in The Manager and starred as Mary Ledger, with Marion Terry and Johnston Forbes-Robertson, in G. W. Godfrey's comedy The Parvenu at the Court Theatre. Reviewing the play, The Labour Standard wrote, "Venne is the Princess of the play; her style is charming, and her voice is clear and sweet." In 1883, she was Marceline in Lurette, Fleurette in Barbe-Bleue and Peg O'Reilly in The Glass of Fashion by Grundy at the Globe Theatre, with Herbert Beerbohm Tree. Among many other roles in the mid-1880s, she played Agatha Poskett in Arthur Wing Pinero's The Magistrate (1885 at the Court Theatre) and Honour in Robert Buchanan's Sophia (1886; adapted from Fielding's Tom Jones at the Vaudeville Theatre).

In 1887, she was Rose in a version of the Arabian Nights, by Von Moser, with Charles Hawtrey and W. S. Penley. The next year, she starred as Mrs. Bardell with Rutland Barrington and Arthur Cecil at the Comedy Theatre in Pickwick by Burnand and Edward Solomon. Barrington commented, "This great little artist possesses, in addition to her many charms, a wonderful manner of speaking that kind of doubtful line which is sometimes alluded to by journalists as 'skating on thin ice'; and this power was occasionally abused by authors, much to her distress. She once came to me at rehearsal and pointing out a speech said, 'B. dear, I can't say that, now, can I?' My obvious reply was, 'Well, Lottie, if you can't, no one can.'" She also appeared as Polly Eccles in Caste by T. W. Robertson (1889) at the Criterion Theatre. In 1890 she was Pert in London Assurance by Dion Boucicault at the Avenue Theatre, followed by two seasons at the Comedy Theatre, including in Poet and Puppets, a travesty of Oscar Wilde's Lady Windermere's Fan, by Charles Brookfield, with Charles Hawtrey. In 1893, she was in a musical piece by Brookfield and Seymour Hicks called Under the Clock at the Court Theatre, also starring Brookfield as Sherlock Holmes and Hicks as Dr. Watson. Venne played Hannah, a maid of all-work. That year, she also played Zulu in Forbidden Fruit at the Vaudeville.

== Later years ==
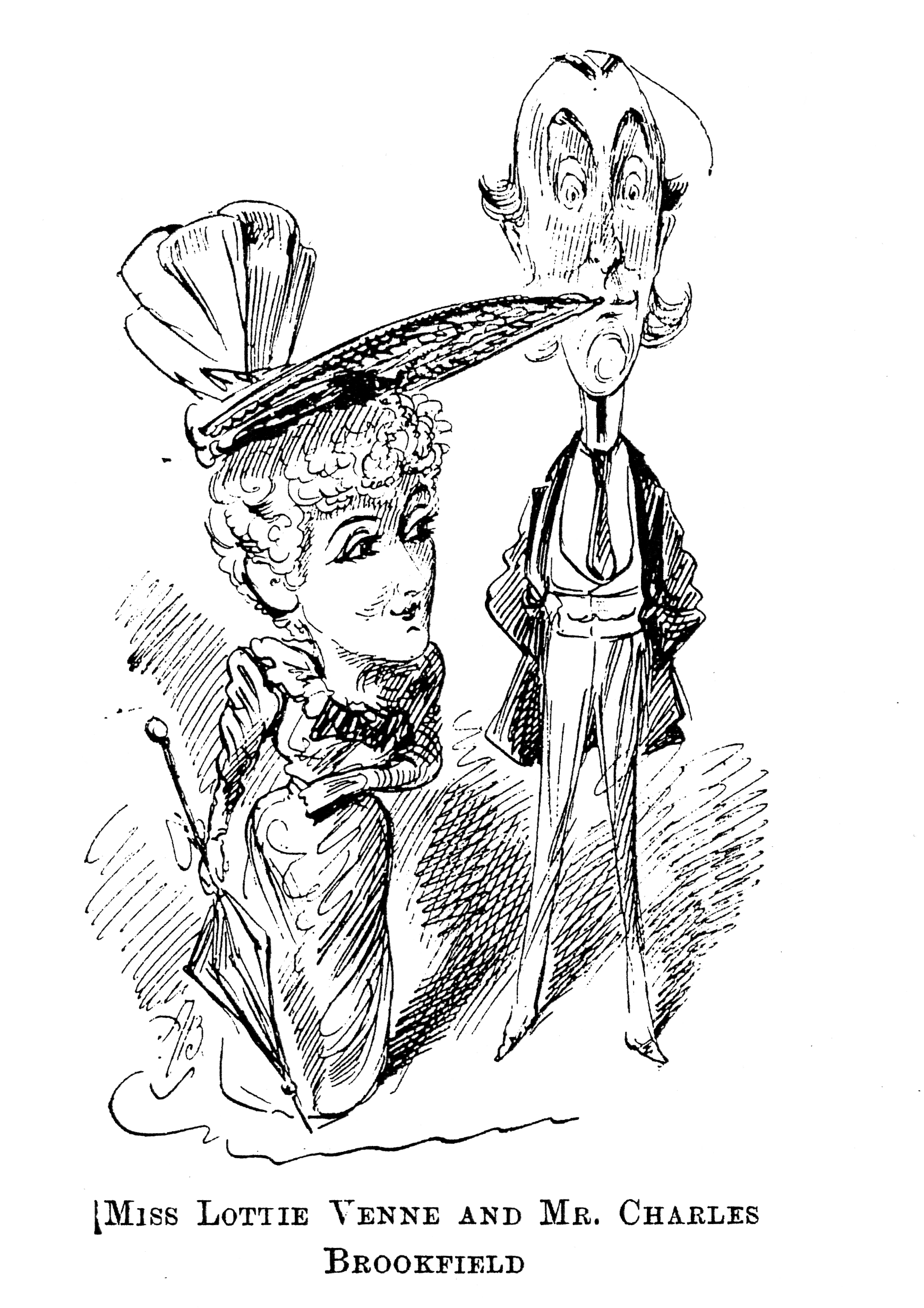

With the advent of Edwardian musical comedy, Venne appeared in George Edwardes hits as Lady Virginia Forrest in The Gaiety Girl (1893), as Madame Amelia in An Artist's Model (1895) and as Lady St. Mallory in Three Little Maids (1902). In 1894, she was in Burnand's A Gay Widow with Hawtrey and Eva Moore. After An Artist's Model, she toured in the companies of Lewis Waller and Lillie Langtry. She returned to London in 1896 and resumed playing a constant schedule of new roles, including Lady Barker in The Mermaids at the Garrick Theatre. She was Lady Horton in The Royal Star with Willie Edouin (1898). She starred as Mrs. Candour in a 1900 revival of The School for Scandal at the Haymarket Theatre.

Among her roles after this were Fatima Wilson West in The Love Birds at the Savoy Theatre and Xenofa in His Highness, My Husband by William Boosey, at the Comedy Theatre, with Eric Lewis (1904). She starred as Mrs. Parker-Jennings in W. Somerset Maugham's hit play Jack Straw, in 1908, with Hawtrey at the Vaudeville Theatre. In 1910, she appeared as Mrs. Cummin in Little Miss Cummin with Marie Lohr at the Playhouse Theatre, and the same year, she was Mrs. Malaprop in The Rivals, by Richard Brinsley Sheridan at the Lyric Theatre. The next year, among other roles, she was Mrs. Grundy in Orpheus in the Underground at His Majesty's Theatre. In 1912, at the Criterion, she was Lady Julia Ventermere in A Young Man's Fancy. She continued to performa a heavy schedule through the end of World War I and beyond.

Venne was also in the 1917 film Masks and Faces. Later stage appearances included the role of Mrs Shuttleworth, with Charles Hawtrey and Gladys Cooper, in Maugham's Home and Beauty in 1919 at the Playhouse Theatre. That year, she was also Mary Knowle in The Romantic Age, a comedy by A. A. Milne at the Comedy Theatre. Later, she played Lady Catherine in The Circle at the Haymarket Theatre. She also reprised her role in Jack Straw (1923) and appeared in The Claimant (1924). The next year, at the Lyric Theatre, Hammersmith, she appeared in Lionel and Clarissa. Her last performance was at the Lyric, Hammersmith on 30 September 1927.

By the end of her career, Venne had appeared in over 200 roles. The theatre community feted Venne in a Jubilee "super-matinee" celebration on 13 November 1925. For the occasion, J. M. Barrie provided scenes from a new play, Shall We Join the Ladies? starring Dion Boucicault, Jr., Gwen Ffrangcon Davies, Ronald Squire, Marie Lohr, Johnston Forbes-Robertson, Gladys Cooper, Gerald du Maurier and others. Others who took part in the celebration included Sonnie Hale, Henry Ainley, Jack Hulbert, Cicely Courtneidge, Marie Tempest, Madge Kendal (who gave the tribute to her) and George Grossmith, Jr.

Venne married the actor Walter H. Fisher, with whom she had performed early in her career on tour, in The Happy Land and in Trial by Jury. Their son was the actor H. J. Fisher, and their daughter the actress Audrey Fisher.

She died in a London nursing home in 1928, aged 79 years. Venne's obituary in The Times commented that her "knowing smile, a smirk that was all her own, made her a personality regarded with real affection during her long [career]".
