= Kate Bishop (actress) =

English actress (1848–1923)

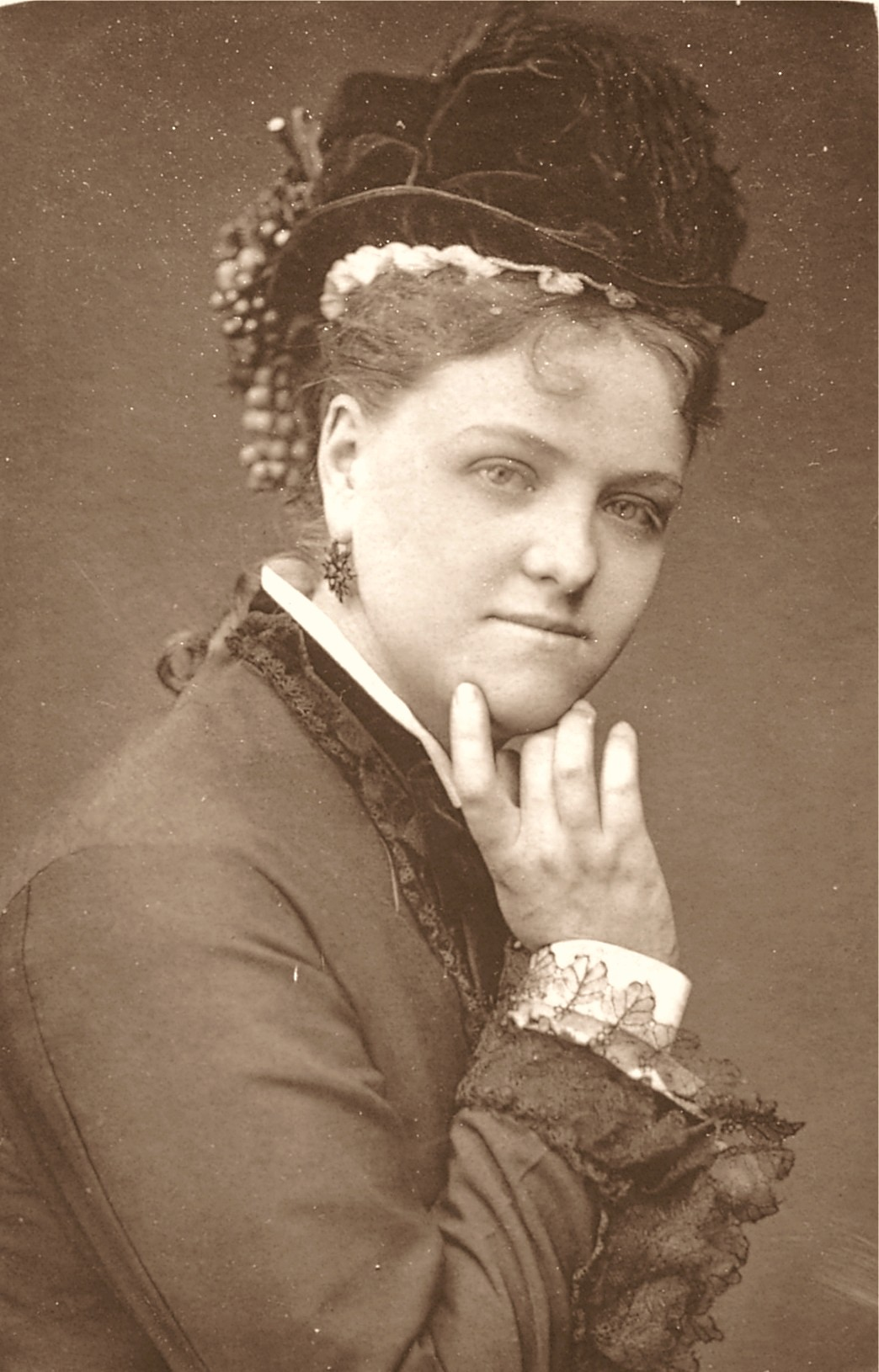
- Born: Kate Alice Bishop; 1 October 1849; Bristol, England
- Died: 12 June 1923 (aged 73); London, England
- Occupation: Actress
- Spouse: Lewis J. Löhr
- Children: Marie Lohr

Kate Alice Bishop (1 October 1849 – 12 June 1923) was an English actress, a member of a theatrical family. Her brother and daughter were also successful actors. She began her career in 1863 and soon was playing roles in Shakespeare and other classic plays. By 1869, she was in the West End performing in both drama and comedy, including originating several roles. Her greatest success was in Our Boys, which ran for more than four years in London. She continued to act in a variety of roles, including in Australia for several seasons in the 1880s. There, she married and temporarily retired from the theatre to raise her daughter, Marie Lohr. She returned to England to play and create character roles in the early years of the twentieth century.

== Biography ==
Bishop was born in Lambeth into a theatrical family, the daughter of Thomas Bishop, a professor of music, and his wife Charlotte, née Woulds. She began acting as a child in her mother's native Bristol in 1863. Her brother Alfred also successfully entered the theatrical profession. Their grandfather, James Woulds, shared with William Macready at one time the management of the historic theatre at Bath.

=== Early career ===
As a teen Bishop was a member of Mr J. H. Chute's Bristol company, which included Madge Kendal, Henrietta Hodson and Ellen Terry. By 1864 she was in Charles Alexander Calvert's company at Prince's Theatre, Manchester, where she played the title character in Black-Eyed Susan and Cordelia in King Lear, among other roles. She then appeared in Manchester under the management of John Hollingshead as Beatrice in Much Ado About Nothing and Clara in Money. In 1868, Bishop appeared with Edward Askew Sothern in a revival of Our American Cousin, in which The Manchester Guardian thought her "arch" and "lacking in dignity".

In the West End she appeared in A Loving Cup at the Royalty Theatre in 1869, and in 1871 at the Royal Court Theatre in a succession of three new comic plays by W. S. Gilbert, playing Edith Temple in Randall's Thumb, Pipette in Creatures of Impulse, and Jessie Blake in On Guard. Of her performance in the last, The Times commented, "The notion of the irresistible flirt is completely realized by Miss Kate Bishop." Bishop played in About Town by Bertie Vyse in 1873 and Ruy Blas Righted and Romulus and Remus, both by Robert Reece, in 1874. She then appeared as Ida in Hermann Vezin's production of David Garrick

=== Our Boys and later career ===
Bishop's most famous stage role was Violet Melrose in H. J. Byron's comedy Our Boys at the Vaudeville Theatre, which she originated in January 1875 and played practically continuously throughout its historic run of four years and four months. When Our Boys finally closed, it was by far the longest-running work of theatre up to that time. Byron supplied a successor, The Girls, in which Bishop had another leading role in 1879. The next year, at the Vaudeville, she played Lady Teazle in The School for Scandal for another long run, followed by Lady Alice in Dion Boucicault's Old Heads and Young Hearts in 1881. Later that year, she was Dora in T. W. Robertson's Home, an adaptation of Émile Augier's comedy L'Aventurière. After this, Bishop moved to Australia to head a company produced by Arthur Garner, playing comedies, including The English Rose. The next season, she moved on to George Rignold's company, as leading lady, in a variety of dramas and comedies, where she stayed for several years, earning strong reviews. In the late 1880s she married and left the stage for more than a decade at the end of the nineteenth century. While there, she taught elocution.

In 1898 Bishop returned to England where, by 1900 she returned to the stage, appearing from May 1900 in Another Man's Wife, a new play, in four acts, by Fenton Mackay at the Grand Theatre, Croydon. Later in the year she appeared in Struwwelpeter (Shock-Headed Peter), at the Garrick Theatre, together with George Grossmith Jr. She played Mrs Percival de Hooley in Jerome K. Jerome's The Passing of the Third Floor Black in 1908. In 1909 she appeared on Broadway in Penelope, by Somerset Maugham, at the Lyceum Theatre. Bishop appeared in Fanny's First Play. She repeated her role in Shock-Headed Peter in 1912 at the Vaudeville Theatre. Her last stage appearance was in 1915, creating the role of Lady Matilda Rye in H. A. Vachell's The Case of Lady Camber at the Savoy Theatre.

=== Personal life ===
In the late 1880s, Bishop married Lewis J. Löhr, treasurer of the Melbourne Opera House and an entrepreneur, whom she met on a ship bound for Australia. Their daughter Marie Lohr, who became a leading actress, was born in 1890 in Sydney, Australia.

Bishop died in London, aged 73, and is buried in Brompton Cemetery.
