= Bufton (surname) =

Bufton is an English surname derived from the Middle English words "(a)bove" and "toun", denoting someone who lived above a settlement; alternatively, it may also be derived from a place with Bufton in its name. Notable people with the surname include:

- Eleanor Bufton, Welsh actress
- John Bufton, British politician
- Sidney Osborne Bufton, British air force commander

== See also ==
- Sir Bufton Tufton, a fictional character in the Private Eye magazine
