= Tita in Thibet =

Musical play by Frank Desprez

Tita in Thibet (aka Brum, a Birmingham Merchant) is an English two-act musical play by Frank Desprez. It opened at the Royalty Theatre in London on 1 January 1879.

Tita in Thibet was written as a vehicle for the music hall star Kate Santley. Fred Leslie and W. H. Seymour, who would become the stage manager of the D'Oyly Carte Opera Company for 20 years, also played in the piece, as did ex-D'Oyly Carte player Walter H. Fisher.

The setting of the piece took advantage of the Victorian fad for anything Far East-themed. Tita became Desprez's most frequently played work and was later staged by the Majilton theatre company more than a thousand times in the British provinces.

== Synopsis ==
In China, a European idol merchant called Brum has a jealous wife named Tita. Brum decides to test his wife by pretending that love letters have been sent to him by another woman. Meanwhile, two Tibetan merchants (Chin-Chin and Po-Hi) and a young tea-gardener (Young Hyson) all seek to wed Tita. They point out that the customs of the country permit every wife to have four husbands. Brum is disgusted and enraged.

To punish her husband for his imagined flirtations, Tita pretends to be charmed by the idea of marrying these suitors, and she agrees to meet them in the Temple of Fo to hold the wedding ceremonies. Brum hides in the Temple and disguises himself as an idol to watch the ceremony. Tita dresses Chin-Chin as a woman and fools Po-Hi and Young Hyson into making their expressions of love to "her". Eventually, Tita and Brum reconcile, and all ends happily.

== Critical reception ==
The Era, a London newspaper, reviewed the piece, as follows:

Miss Santley appeared as Tita, a part which seemed to please her immensely. Her singing, like her speaking, was spoiled by affectation, although it is only right to say that in "I wish I was a man" and in "Poor Mrs. B." – both songs of the Music Hall class – she was vociferously applauded by the youths in the gallery. In the second act Miss Santley wears a dress which gives a very liberal display of personal charms. Mr. W. H. Fisher played the part of Brum with considerable "go," and his acting in the idol business of the second act was decidedly funny. Mr. Charles Groves exhibited some dry humour as Chin-Chin, but the everlasting talk about the umbrella which he carries may be modified with advantage. Very comical indeed was the Po-Hi of Mr. Frederick Leslie, whose method of indicating mental anguish called forth considerable merriment. Miss Alma Stanley made an imposing Young Hyson, and was of service in the interpretation of the music; the Great and Little Bonzes being respectively represented by Mr. C. A. White and Mr. W. H. Seymour. To those in search of a good and refined entertainment we certainly cannot recommend a visit to the Royalty.

== Roles and original cast ==
- Brum (a European idol merchant) – Walter H. Fisher
- Tita (his jealous wife) – Kate Santley
- Chin-Chin (a mandarin of second class, in love with Tita) – Charles Groves
- Po-Hi (a mandarin of the first class who also seeks to marry Tita) – Fred Leslie
- Young Hyson (an impassioned young tea-gardener) – Alma Stanley
- The Great Bonze – C. A. White
- The Little Bonze – W. H. Seymour

== Songs ==
Songs in the show include:

- "I wish I was a man"
- "Poor Mrs. B."
