= W. J. Hill =

Actor, singer and comedian (1834–1888)

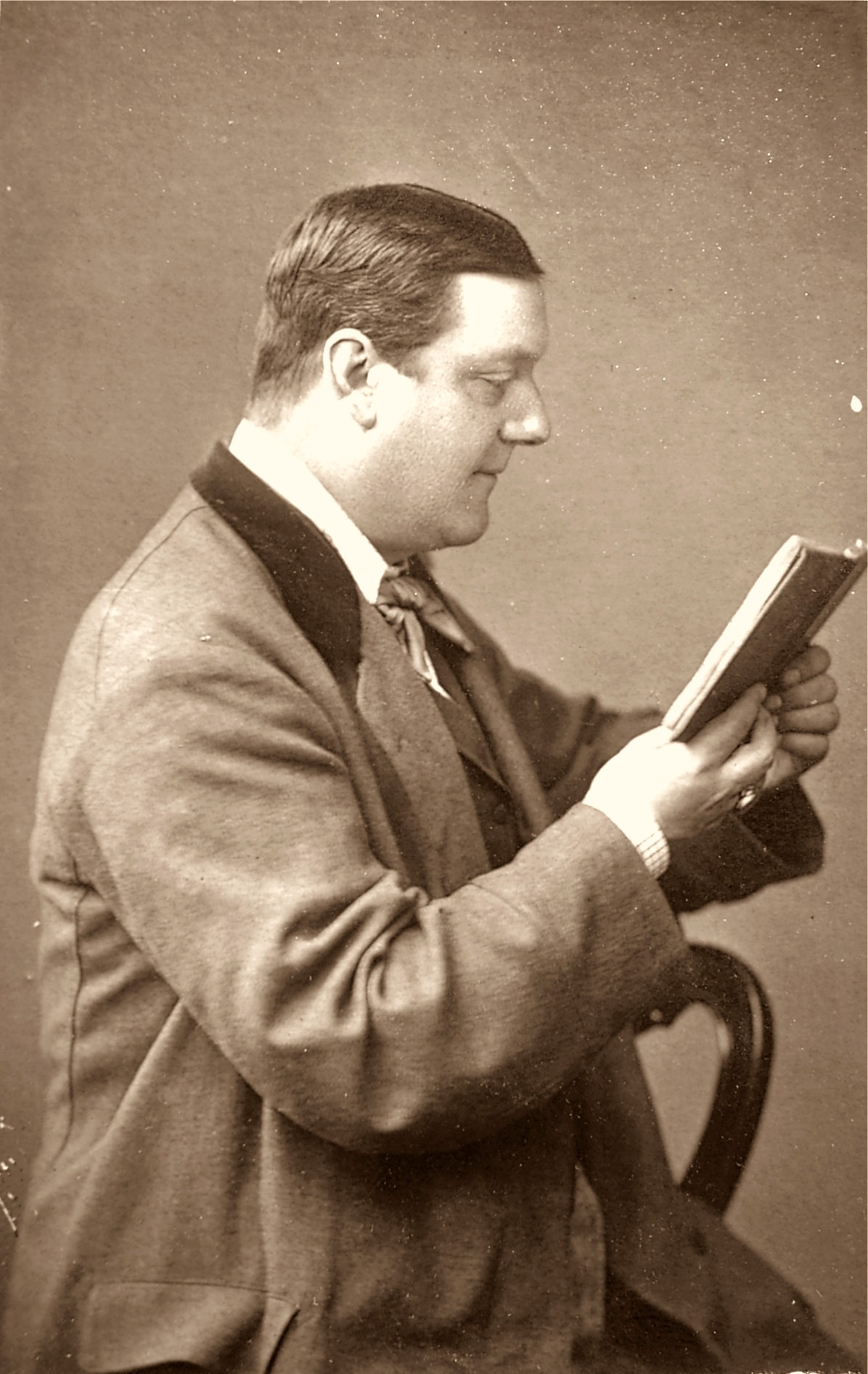
W.J.Hill

William Jones Hill (14 January 1834 – 13 April 1888) was an English actor, singer and comedian.

Hill began his career in New York in 1868. Upon his return to England, he began in roles at the Royal Court Theatre in such works as The Wedding March (1873). He was later a member of the company at the Criterion Theatre. He appeared in the dual roles of Phyllon and "Mr. L" in The Happy Land (1873) and Ladle in "No Thoroughfare" at the Olympic Theatre in London in 1876. In 1882, he starred as Rev. William Barlow in The Vicar of Bray. He also played the role of Mr. Cattermole in The Private Secretary.

Until two days before his death at the age of 54, he was playing the role of Irascible Fizzleton in Nita's First at the Novelty Theatre in London. He was buried at Highgate Cemetery under the name William Hill Jones.
