= Creatures of Impulse =

Play with songs written by W. S. Gilbert

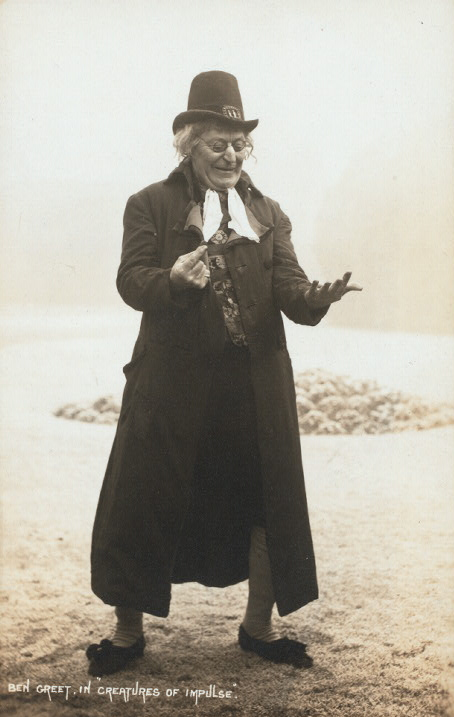
Ben Greet in the role of Boomblehardt

Creatures of Impulse is a stage play by the English dramatist W. S. Gilbert, with music by the composer-conductor Alberto Randegger, which Gilbert adapted from his own short story. Both the play and the short story concern an unwanted and ill-tempered old fairy who enchants people to behave in a manner opposite to their natures, with farcical results.

The short story was written for The Graphic's Christmas number of 1870, and the play was first produced at the Court Theatre on 2 April 1871. It originally included six songs, but three were eventually cut, and some productions dispensed with the music entirely. While the lyrics survive, the music was never published and is lost. Reviews of the play were mostly positive, though it was criticised for the lack of a significant plot or superstructure to support its comic premise. Nonetheless, reviewers found it enjoyable, and it was a modest success, running for 91 performances and enjoying revivals into the early part of the 20th century.

Gilbert had already written a considerable body of stories, plays, poems, criticism and other works before writing Creatures of Impulse. He later wrote the libretti to the famous series of Savoy operas (composed by Arthur Sullivan) between 1871 and 1896.

== Background ==
=== Writer and composer ===
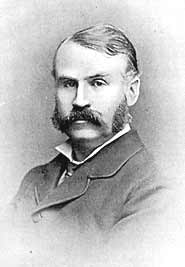
W. S. Gilbert, c. 1870

From the mid-1860s to the early 1870s, W. S. Gilbert was extremely productive, writing a large quantity of comic verse, theatre reviews and other journalistic pieces, short stories, and dozens of plays and comic operas. His output in 1870 included dozens of his popular comic Bab Ballads; two blank verse comedies, The Princess and The Palace of Truth; two comic operas, Our Island Home and The Gentleman in Black; and various other short stories, comic pieces, and reviews appearing in various periodicals and newspapers. In 1871 he was even busier, producing seven plays and operas.

Gilbert's dramatic writing during this time was evolving from his early musical burlesques to a more restrained style, as exemplified in his string of blank-verse fairy comedies. The first of these was The Palace of Truth, which opened in 1870 to widespread acclaim. He was also developing his unique style of absurdist humour, described as "Topsy-Turvy", made up of "a combination of wit, irony, topsyturvydom, parody, observation, theatrical technique, and profound intelligence". The story and play Creatures of Impulse date from the middle of this period, when Gilbert was trying different styles and working towards the mature style of his later work, including the famous series of Gilbert and Sullivan operas. Gilbert described the play as a "musical fairytale".

Italian-born Alberto Randegger was better known as a conductor and professor of singing than as a composer, although he composed several full-length works and numerous vocal pieces in England in the 1860s and 1870s. He is also remembered for his important 1879 textbook entitled Singing. His music for Creatures of Impulse was criticised as "extremely undramatic", though others found it "pretty". The score has been lost.

=== Genesis of story and play ===
Gilbert first published Creatures of Impulse as a short story, under the title "A Strange Old Lady", in the 1870 Christmas number of The Graphic, an illustrated weekly newspaper. He later selected it for inclusion in the only collection of his short stories published during his lifetime, Foggerty's Fairy and Other Tales (1890), at which point he renamed it to match the theatrical adaptation. Gilbert did not originally intend for the story to be turned into a play; nonetheless, a few months later it was on stage.

He adapted the story into a play for Marie Litton's Royal Court Theatre. Litton took over the proprietorship of the New Chelsea Theatre in 1871 and renamed it the Royal Court. Its opening attraction was the première of Gilbert's Randall's Thumb, and when that play proved successful, it was no surprise, as the London Echo pointed out, that she followed it with another work by Gilbert. He often used his previous prose work as the basis of later plays, and "The Strange Old Lady" was no exception. Under the new title of Creatures of Impulse, it opened on 2 April 1871 as a companion piece for Randall's Thumb. Successful, it lasted through 91 performances and acted as a companion piece to five different plays. Litton continued to commission works from Gilbert, including Gilbert's adaptation of Charles Dickens' Great Expectations in 1871, Broken Hearts in 1875, various translations of French works, and The Happy Land in 1873, which portrayed members of the British Government on stage and caused such a scandal that it had an unusually long run.

=== Subsequent productions and publications ===
The play was revived in 1872 at the Court Theatre, in 1873 at the Queen's Theatre, and in 1874 at the Vaudeville Theatre (running for over 100 performances), all in London. It appears to have gone through several changes during these revivals, the first of which was described on its playbill as a "shortened version", and the last as an "altered" one. Various versions continued to be produced into the 20th century by amateurs as well as occasional professional groups, such as Ben Greet's Elizabethan Stage Society of England. An acting edition was published by T. H. Lacy around 1871. T. H. Lacy's company was acquired by Samuel French, and the libretto continued to be printed until about 1970. The piece, still occasionally produced, was part of the International Gilbert and Sullivan Festival in 2006. It was presented by Gilbert and Sullivan Opera Victoria in Australia in 2024.

Substantial cuts were made in the text by the time the play was collected for Original Plays, Fourth Series (1911), the last volume of the only large-scale collection of Gilbert's stage work. Victorian plays had to be approved by the Lord Chamberlain for decency before they were performed, and the version submitted was then archived, providing a more-or-less complete collection of Victorian theatrical output, now part of the British Library. Comparison of the "licensing copy" of Creatures of Impulse from this archive with that printed in Original Plays reveals lyrics for three additional songs and a second verse to the opening chorus and finale.

== Synopsis ==
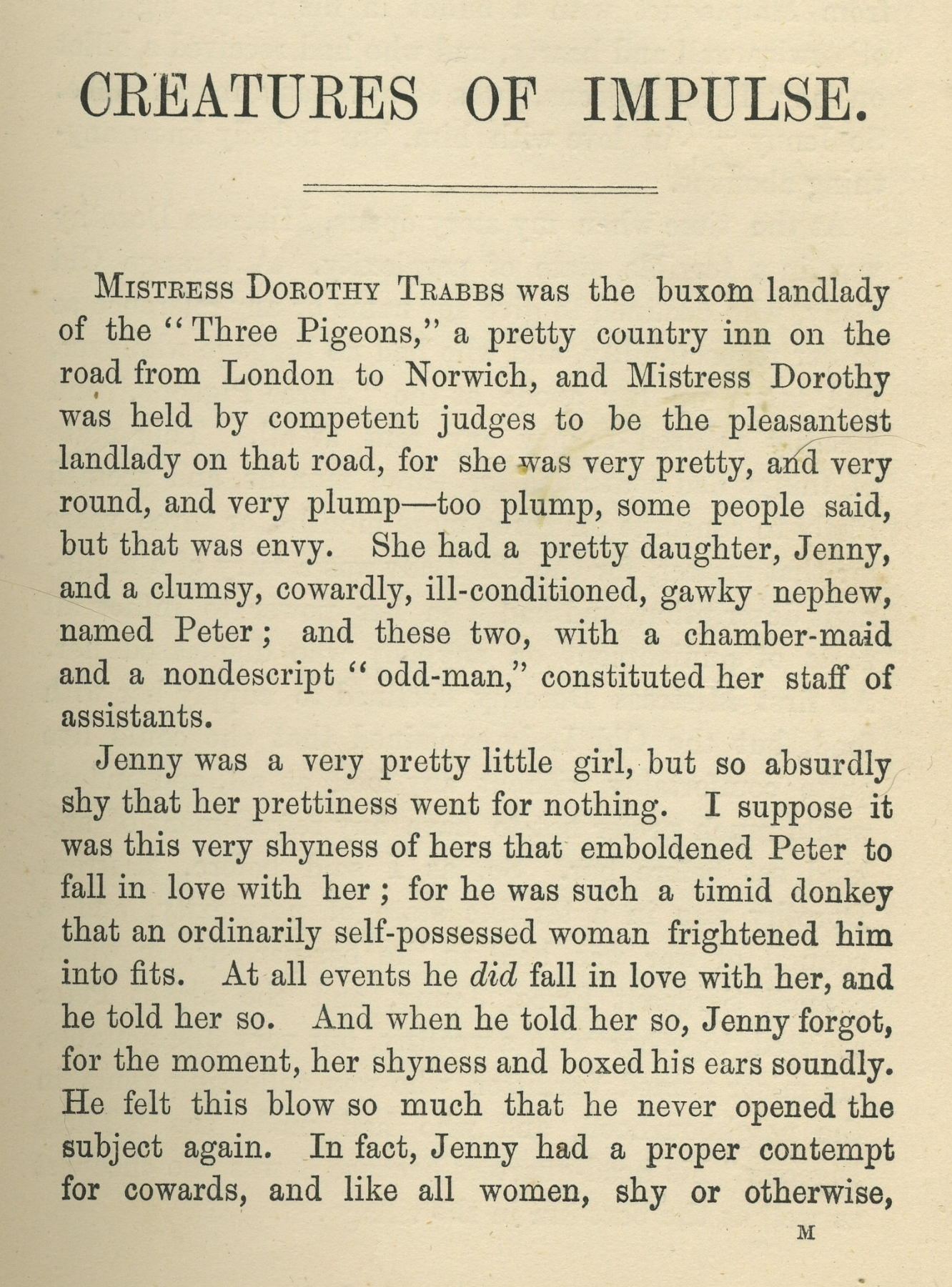
The first page of Creatures of Impulse in Foggerty's Fairy and Other Tales

At "The Three Pigeons" inn, it is a good day for some: the miser Boomblehardt has been out collecting rents from his tenants, and Sergeant Klooque, hero of Johannesburg, has just arrived at the inn on leave and may now flirt with any lady he chooses, without the need to pretend they are his relatives to get around his tyrannical Colonel. However, it is not a good day for Martha, the landlady of the inn: staying there is a strange old lady, a mischievous fairy, who refuses to pay or to leave, and who needs neither food nor water. This is substantially cutting into Martha's profits. She enlists Boomblehardt and Klooque, the cowardly farmer Peter,^{[a]} and her extremely shy niece, Pipette, to help solve this problem.

Peter, not cowardly enough to fear an old woman, nor superstitious enough to believe in her power, threatens the old fairy, trying to chase her away. Unfortunately, she does indeed have fairy powers and casts a spell that forces Peter to threaten anyone he encounters or, if alone, to fight imaginary enemies. Peter flees before he can get himself into trouble by threatening anyone bigger than him, calling out challenges as he goes. Sergeant Klooque approaches the old woman next and tries to use his military charm to win her over. It turns out that she hates soldiers, and she strikes out with her stick, making him duck and dodge. She then casts a spell to make his cringing, dodging and ducking permanent, intending that he lose his reputation and be branded a coward. Pipette arrives and watches his behaviour in astonishment. "He's showing you how he fought the enemy at Johannesburg," exclaims the old lady, but he replies "No, my dear!" I'm showing you how the enemy fought us. This is the way they retreated". He leaves, cringing and pleading for imaginary attackers to stop as he goes.

Pipette then tries to coax the old lady into leaving, kissing and hugging her, and appealing to her (hoped for) good nature. The old lady sees through her attempt, and in punishment for her "telling stories" compels her to kiss and cuddle all she meets. She cries out in protest that she's too shy for such behaviour, but the old lady assures her that she'll "get over [her] shyness after a year or two of that sort of thing". Boomblehardt approaches next, and Pipette flings herself on him, crying "Kiss me!". He obliges. She responds, "How dare you take such a liberty! You insolent old man! Kiss me". And so he does. She boxes his ears, much to his confusion, and then retreats into the inn in tears.

Boomblehardt then meets with the old woman. The miser has heard that the strange old lady does not need to eat and offers to help her stay at the inn if she will teach him her secret of how to avoid wasting money on food.^{[b]} He offers her a golden guinea. The fairy decides that someone that miserly must be punished and compels him to continue passing out guineas to all he meets.

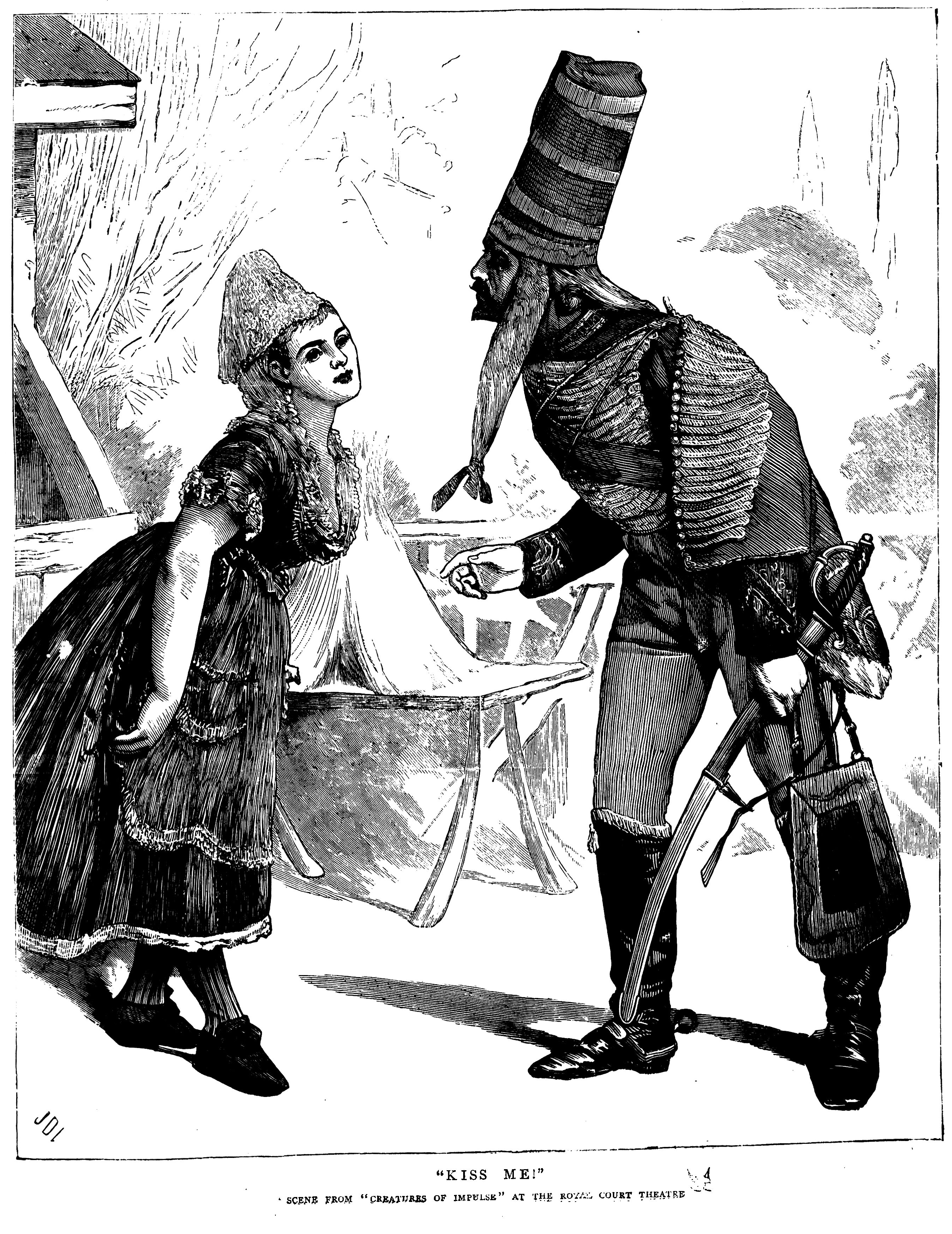
Pipette throws herself at the Sergeant, in an illustration from The Graphic, 1871.

Soon complications arise from these curses. Boomblehardt finds Sergeant Klooque's curse hilarious and decides that if he must give out money, the sergeant is as good as any other. The shy Pipette throws herself at Sergeant, who unwillingly ducks and dodges, trying to avoid her. When Peter arrives, he is forced to get into a fight with the sergeant over her, at which, to his surprise, the brave sergeant cowers, dodges, and ducks. Boomblehardt continues passing out guineas, his fortune dribbling away. Then Martha chases her customers out of the inn with a broom: She too has been cursed. Everyone has fallen under the fairy's ironic curses, forced to behave in a manner contrary to his or her intrinsic nature.

Now the old lady makes her crucial mistake: She heads downstairs to check on her mischief, and the cursed group all run up to her to beg her to relent. They all behave as compelled by their curses: Peter threatens her, Pipette tries to kiss her, the sergeant ducks away from her, the miser offers her money, and the landlady keeps trying to chase her out with a broom. The chaos is overwhelming: "In short, the Old Lady, who was much more than a match for each of them taken singly, was overpowered by numbers". She is left with no choice but to relent, release the spells and leave, vanquished and embarrassed.

The short story continues a bit further, making explicit some elements that are only hinted at in the play:

The really curious part of this story is that, after everything had been explained, and all had been restored to their normal courses of action, none of the personages involved in it married each other. They were all so annoyed at having made such fools of themselves that they walked out of the inn in different directions, and were never seen or heard of again. Except Peter, who, seeing nothing to be ashamed of in showing such undaunted courage, remained and kept the "Three Pigeons", and prospered remarkably to the end of his days.

That no one marries at the end of the play was a daring innovation for Victorian theatre, and the reviewer from Era mentioned his surprise at this.

Synopsis notes:

^{a} In the short story, Peter is instead her nephew. This has no effect on the plot.
^{b} In the story, Boomblehardt's equivalent, Verditter, is instead courting the landlady, as her inn is profitable and she has some fine silver; therefore, he tries to bribe the fairy to leave in order that he may make money elsewhere.

== Characters and original cast ==
Name in play	Name in short story	Play description	Short story description	Originator of role
Sergeant Klooque	Sergeant Brice	A soldier in the King's Hussars, just returned from Johannesburg	A soldier in Her Majesty Queen Anne's Foot Guards, just returned from Malplaquet.	W. M. Terrott
Boomblehardt	Verditter	A miser	A miser	Edward Righton
Martha	Dorothy Trabbs	Landlady of the Three Pigeons	Landlady of the Three Pigeons	Miss L. Harris
Peter	Peter	A young farmer	The landlady's nephew	Maggie Brennan
Pipette	Jenny	The landlady's niece	The landlady's daughter	Kate Bishop
Jacques	–	A villager	–	Charles Parry
A Strange Old Lady	A Strange Old Lady	A strange old lady	A strange old lady	Lucy Franklein

As was common in Victorian drama, a woman (Maggie Brennan) played a young man (Peter). The play's script assigns dialogue to three numbered villagers in the opening scene. The named character of Jacques has no more lines than any of these and disappears after the first page of the script. Righton, who first played Boomblehardt, portrayed him as a Jewish caricature. Gilbert's script did not use a Jewish dialect, and historian Jane Stedman suggests that Righton's increasingly broad portrayal and interpolations show that Gilbert had little control of Righton's portrayal of the part.

== Songs ==
The number of songs varied from production to production. The version submitted to the Lord Chamberlain had six songs, and an early review in The Times wrote that it was "overweighted with a quantity of extremely undramatic music", though the London Echo thought the music was "pretty". Nonetheless, the version printed in Gilbert's Original Plays (1911) cut these six songs to three, and some productions omitted the songs entirely.

The list of songs in the licence copy is:

1. "Did you ever know a lady so particularly shady" – Jacques and villagers
2. "Some people love Spring" – Boomblehardt
3. "At home at last all danger past" – Sergeant Klooque
4. "A soldier in the King's Hussars" – Sergeant Klooque, Pipette, and Peter
5. "With furious blow" – Peter, Pipette, Sergeant Klooque, and Martha
6. "Finale: Go away, ma'am, go away, ma'am" – ensemble

While the lyrics survive, none of the music was ever published, and it has been lost. The version in Original Plays omits the second verse of Nos. 1 and 6 and cuts Nos. 2, 3, and 5.

== Critical reception ==
Reviews for the play were generally favourable, but it was criticised for its loose structure and lack of a substantial plot. Bell's Life in London and Sporting Chronicle opined: "Amusing, simple, and ingenious, 'Creatures of Impulse' is another, though a slight, addition to the successes of its author". The London Echo compared the piece to a "burletta of the stamp that was in vogue a hundred years ago, resembling Midas, perhaps, more nearly than that of any modern burlesque", and wrote that it "contains pretty music, and smart if not witty dialogue, a semi-moral and a semi-plot". The Graphic concluded that "Although it occupies only an hour in performance, the story is well told and the piece is exceedingly amusing" and praised the acting. Righton received special praise for his portrayal of Boomblehardt: "No character on stage perhaps ever made audiences laugh more in so short a time". In an 1882 assessment of the piece for amateur theatre societies, M. E. James noted that "The singing is a great addition. It is altogether an amusing bit of nonsense, and very original".

The Times review was less positive than most, saying that although the play was good, more was expected of Gilbert:

As noblesse oblige, so does great success become liable to a certain penalty. Had the little piece we have just described been the work of some unknown hand we might have accepted it as an agreeable trifle, displaying more than common ingenuity in its invention, and, with the aid of picturesque costumes, lively setting, and a pretty decoration, gracefully concluding the evening's entertainment, although overweighted with a quantity of extremely undramatic music. But with the remembrance of The Palace of Truth fresh in our minds, we cannot help a feeling of disappointment when we find the author of that really poetical work coming forward as the writer of another "fairy tale", so immeasurably inferior.... [T]he fairy only enchants her victims to disenchant them at pleasure, without arriving at any result, and we have a good foundation with scarcely any superstructure whatsoever.
