= Frances Maria Kelly =

English actress and singer

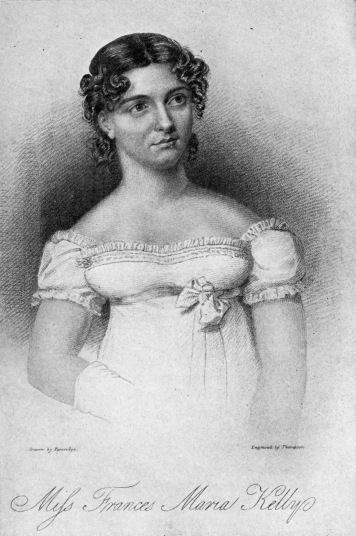
Frances Maria Kelly

Frances Maria Kelly (15 October 1790, Brighton – 6 December 1882), also known as Fanny, was an English actress and singer. She is best known for her acting at the Drury Lane Theatre in London's West End and her opening of the Royalty Theatre and Dramatic School in Soho, known as Miss Kelly's Theatre and Dramatic School, in 1840, for the training of young women. Prior to this, in 1833 Kelly managed the Royal Strand Theatre in Westminster, where she operated a dramatic school, the earliest record of a drama school in England.

== Family ==
Kelly was the daughter of Mark Kelly and Mary Singleton. Her father was the master of ceremonies at Dublin Castle and a minor actor. Kelly was the niece of the tenor Michael Kelly, whom she worked with starting at the age of seven. Her father acquired a great deal of debt, and he deserted Fanny and her mother in 1795. Despite this, Fanny later supported him financially until his death on 4 April 1833. Her mother died on 1 August 1827.

== Drury Lane Theatre ==
On 16 January 1798, at the age of seven, Kelly made her first appearance at the Drury Lane Theatre in her uncle Michael Kelly’s opera, Blue-Beard. A year later she joined the company as a chorister at Drury Lane. While still a chorister, she appeared as Prince Arthur in King John and the Duke of York in Richard III. Kelly acted at the theatre from 1798 until a fire there on 9 February 1809. The reconstructed Theatre was not reopened until October 1812, after which Kelly returned to perform there for many more years. She was seen at Drury Lane for the last time on 8 June 1835.

== Drama schools and theatre management ==
In 1833 Kelly established a drama school at the Royal Strand Theatre, which is the oldest drama school in England on record. The income she received from pupils at the school boosted the earnings she obtained from performing her one woman show.

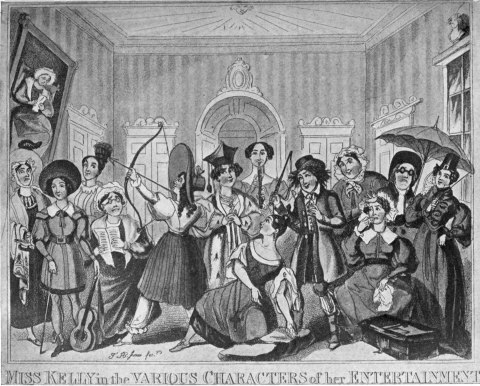
Frances Maria Kelly "Entertains" from The Works of Charles Lamb (1818)

After leaving the Drury Lane Theatre, Kelly opened a dramatic school for training young women using £20,000 of her own money. She continued to give "entertainments" occasionally, in which she would switch among up to fourteen different characters. She built a theatre onto the back of her house which she originally named Miss Kelly’s Theatre and later called The Royalty. The Royalty opened on 24 May 1840 and was used by the first amateur company in the United Kingdom.

== Stalking and marriage proposals ==
Kelly received random offers of marriage from George Barnett who was infatuated with her but disapproved of the parts that she was playing. He was annoyed that she was appearing as a man in a "breeches role". Barnett bought a ticket to see her appear in Modern Antiques, or the Merry Mourners at Covent Garden on 16 February 1816, where he fired a pistol. Kelly was unhurt but the bullet fell into the lap of Mary Lamb, a British writer who ironically had committed matricide herself in 1796 while temporarily mentally ill. Barnett was later declared insane when he appeared in court. Mary's brother, Charles Lamb, a writer and poet who had been there on the night of the shooting, later wrote a sonnet about Kelly and proposed marriage to her. She refused him too.

== Final years ==
After many years of working at the Royalty Theatre and Dramatic School as well as continuing to give Shakespearian readings, Kelly fell into debt from legal disputes over the theatre. She fought for many years to gain the money back. She was given a royal grant shortly before her death on 6 December 1882, at the age of 92. Kelly was buried in Brompton Cemetery.
