= The Realm of Joy =

One-act farce by W. S. Gilbert

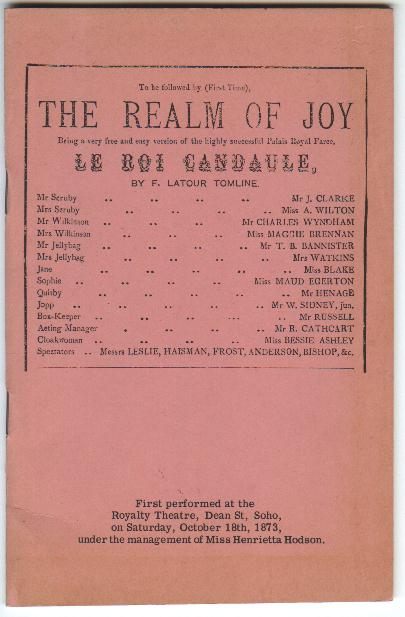

The Realm of Joy is a one-act farce by W. S. Gilbert, writing under the pseudonym "F. Latour Tomline". It opened at the Royalty Theatre on 18 October 1873, running for about 113 performances, until 27 February 1874.

The play is based on the farce, Le Roi Candaule, by Henri Meilhac and Ludovic Halevy, two of Jacques Offenbach's favourite librettists.

== Background ==
As I consider that I am quite as well qualified to judge of what is fit for the ears of a theatrical audience as [the Licencer of Plays] can be, I have systematically declined to take the slightest notice of his instructions

— W.S. Gilbert in The Era, 1872.

The Realm of Joy is set in the lobby of a theatre where a politically scandalous play, "The Realm of Joy" is being performed – a clear reference to Gilbert's play from the same year, The Happy Land (1873), which was still running on the first night of this piece. The Lord Chamberlain had briefly banned The Happy Land for its political satire and for costuming its characters to resemble particular government officials, which is lampooned in this play by references to "the Lord High Disinfectant" and by the descriptions of the banned costumes by Jane and Sophie.

Gilbert likely used the pseudonym "Tomline" as a taunt to the Lord Chamberlain, as the pseudonym would already have been known from The Happy Land. The Lord Chamberlain's Office licensed the play despite its provocative tone to prevent a round of bad publicity like the one which arose from the Happy Land affair. Historian Andrew Crowther states that during the run of the play, the title was changed to The Realms of Joy.

In The Happy Land (1873), The Realm of Joy and Charity (1874), Gilbert pushed the boundaries of how far satire could go in the theatre. Charity moved beyond political satire to critique the contrasting ways in which Victorian society treated men and women who had sex outside of marriage, which anticipated the 'problem plays' of Shaw and Ibsen.

== Roles ==
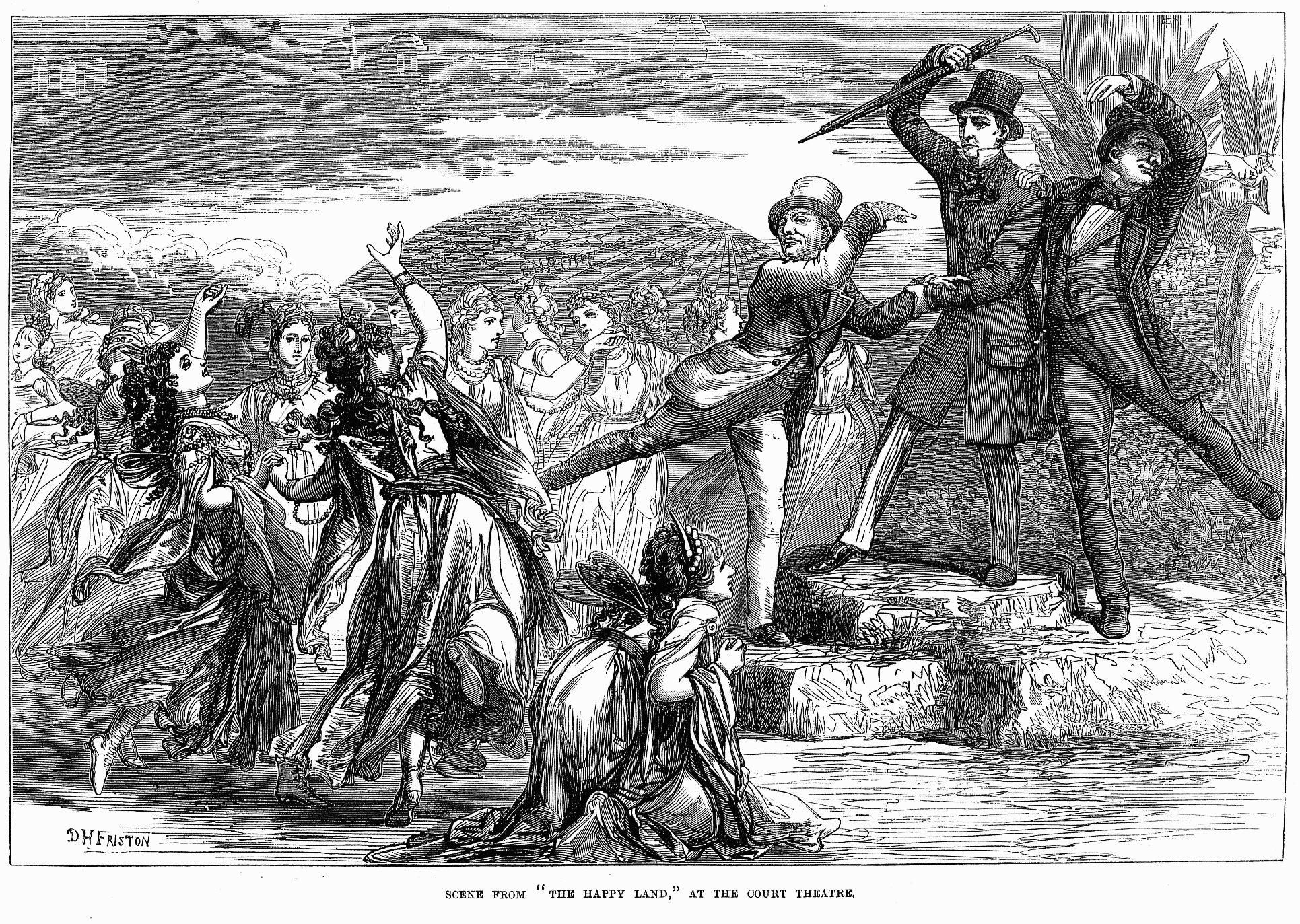
The Happy Land's impersonations of Gladstone, Lowe and Ayrton caused a scandal that was parodied in The Realm of Joy.

Box-Keeper – Mr Russell
Cloakwoman – Bessie Ashley

Quilsby – Mr Henage	}	Two "swells"
Jopp – W. Sidney Jr	}	Two "swells"

Mr. Jellybag – T. B. Bannister
Mrs. Jellybag, his wife – Mrs. Watkins

Jane – Miss Blake	}	Their daughters
Sophie – Maud Egerton	}	Their daughters

Mr. Wilkinson – Charles Wyndham
Mrs. Scruby (or Screwby, in the licensing copy) – Augusta Wilton
Mr. Scruby, her husband – J. Clarke
Acting Manager – R. Cathcart
Mrs. Wilkinson – Maggie Brennan
Other spectators, etc.

== Synopsis ==
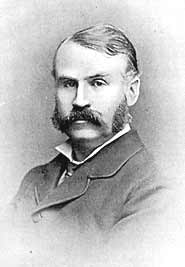
W.S. Gilbert in about 1870

The scene is the box office lobby of a theatre where a politically scandalous play, implied to be Gilbert's contemporaneous play The Happy Land, is being produced. The play is so popular that spectators are literally crammed into the private boxes, sitting on each other's laps. The boxkeeper thinks that the play is scandalous, but "Society comes because Society is loth to believe in such audacity on mere hearsay, and flocks to the theatre in thousands to witness the appalling spectacle for themselves." Quisby and Jopp, a pair of "swells", arrive to see the play for the sixty-eighth and eighty-fifth time, respectively – but only to "moralise over the depravity of human nature" and "see the spectators". Mr. and Mrs. Jellybag have taken their young daughters (who interest Quisby and Jopp greatly) but arrange for them to be sent out with the cloakwoman whenever things get too scandalous. They're soon sent back out, and declare themselves much amused (A "melancholy instance of juvenile depravity" according to the cloakwoman.)

Meanwhile, Mr. Wilkinson has arrived with Mrs. Scruby. Mr. Scruby now arrives, waiting for Mrs. Wilkinson – but his box has been sold to another person as well. Both Mr. Scruby and Mr. Wilkinson have forbidden their wives from seeing the piece, and so have agreed to take each other's wives to it. Farcical complications ensue, with attempts to hide each other's wives from the other husband. In the confusion, the Jellybags' daughters give in to Quisby and Jopp's flirting and head off with them, unnoticed by the Cloakwoman. Everything comes out between the Scrubys and Wilkinsons, and, as they all were guilty of the same act, they forgive each other and go in to watch the show – but it's over! Ah, well! Now they can come as often as they like together.
