= Marie Litton =

English actress and theatre manager

Marie Litton as Rosalind in As You Like It, 1880

Marie Litton (7 May 1846 – 1 April 1884) was the stage name of Mary Jessie Lowe, an English actress and theatre manager. After beginning a stage career in 1868, Litton became an actor-manager in 1871, producing plays for four years at the Court Theatre, including several by W. S. Gilbert. She also appeared in, and sometimes managed, other West End theatres. In the late 1870s, Litton managed the theatre at the Royal Aquarium, where she had some of her biggest acting successes, including as Lady Teazle in The School for Scandal (1877), Lydia Languish in The Rivals (1878), Miss Hardcastle in She Stoops to Conquer and Rosalind in As You Like It (both in 1879).

== Early life and career ==
Litton was born in Hartington, Derbyshire, but was raised in Lincolnshire, where her father Thomas Lowe was a clergyman. In 1868 she made her London stage debut at the Princess's Theatre as the title character in The Trial of Effie Deans, a play by Dion Boucicault, adapted from Sir Walter Scott's novel The Heart of Midlothian. She followed this with the leading role in Boucicault's Presumptive Evidence. Later in 1868, at the opening of the Gaiety Theatre, she played Mrs Cureton in a play by Alfred Thompson, On the Cards, adapted from L'Escamoteur by Paulin Meunier. She next appeared there as Alice Renshaw in Uncle Dick's Darling, by H. J. Byron (1869). After this, she appeared for a year for Mrs Nye Chart at the Theatre Royal, Brighton.

From 1871 to 1874, Litton managed the Court Theatre, beginning with a play by W. S. Gilbert, Randall's Thumb. She also produced Gilbert's Creatures of Impulse, Great Expectations (adapted from the Dickens novel) and On Guard, all in 1881, and The Happy Land and The Wedding March, both in 1873. Litton appeared in most of the plays that she produced, receiving favourable critical reviews for the "grace of manner" of her acting. At times during her tenure at the Court, she also appeared at the Haymarket Theatre; there she created the role of Zayda in Gilbert's The Wicked World (1873). She also briefly managed the Queen's Theatre. She created the role of Caroline Effingham in Gilbert's Tom Cobb at the St James's Theatre in 1875, and played Mrs Montressor in Unequal Match by Tom Taylor at the Prince of Wales's Theatre.

== Royal Aquarium and later years ==
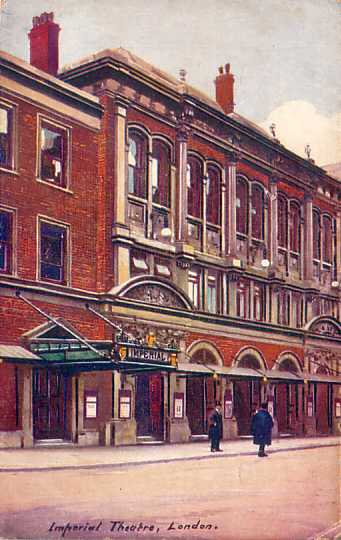
The Royal Aquarium Theatre, managed by Litton in the 1870s

Litton played Lady Teazle in The School for Scandal in 1877 at the Royal Aquarium's theatre. In 1878, she became the manager of that theatre (renamed the Imperial Theatre in 1879), succeeding her husband. Her company there, which included the veteran actor Samuel Phelps and such other notable actors as Hermann Vezin, Kyrle Bellew and Lionel Brough, produced revivals of classic English comedies. There, she played Lydia Languish in an 1897 revival of The Rivals and Miss Hardcastle in She Stoops to Conquer, in 1879, for a long run. She also produced there a revival of Gilbert's Great Expectations in 1877, the farce Fun in a Fog and Family Honour by Frank Marshall (both in 1878), The Beaux' Stratagem by George Farquhar and The Poor Gentleman (1879). She also played Olivia in The Vicar of Wakefield at the Imperial. She played Rosalind in As You Like It at the Imperial in 1879 before transferring to the Theatre Royal, Drury Lane, earning "universal" critical praise.

At the Gaiety in 1879, while still managing the Imperial, she managed the matinees, at which she played Peggy in David Garrick's The Country Girl. Litton also briefly managed the new Theatre Royal in Glasgow, Scotland and also toured the north with her Imperial company, but returned to the Drury Lane in 1881, playing Eve de Malvoisie in the melodrama Youth by Augustus Harris and Paul John Meritt. In 1882, she played the female lead in Son of the Soil and Daisy Bret in Herman Merivale's The Cynic, among other works, and created the role of Vere Herbert in Moths, an adaptation by Henry Hamilton of Ouida's novel of the same name, at the Globe Theatre, her last major success. An obituary in The Era noted her generosity with aid, advice and friendly help to others in the theatrical profession and commented: "Her vivacity and versatility were associated with a refinement and intelligence commanding not only the admiration of playgoers, but the esteem and respect of all acquainted with her in private life."

Litton had a long affair with the married theatre manager, William Wybrow Robertson (1831–1908), beginning by 1865, and after his wife died, they married in 1879. By mid-1882 Litton's health was declining with the cancer that would eventually kill her, and she was forced to retire, making only a few more appearances on stage. She moved with her husband and two children to Ascot, Berkshire, and she died in South Kensington, London, in 1884, at the age of 37.
