= Eleanor Bufton =

Welsh actress

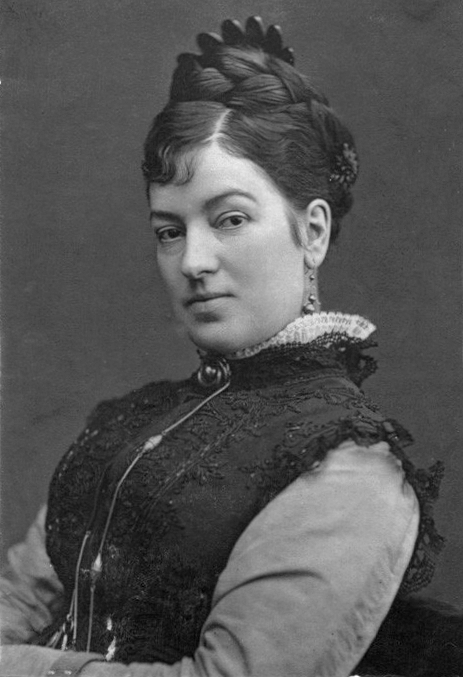
- Born: 2 June 1842; Wales
- Died: 9 April 1893 (aged 50); London, England
- Occupation: Actress
- Years active: 1854-1893
- Spouse: Arthur Swanborough
- Children: 2

Eleanor Bufton (2 June 1842 – 9 April 1893) was a Welsh actress of the Victorian era. She began acting in her teens and spent most of her career in London, playing in Shakespeare, Victorian burlesque, and a range of drama and comedy roles.

== Early life and work ==
Bufton was born in Llanbister, Wales, to Mary Bufton. Her acting debut at the age of 14 was as a chambermaid in The Clandestine Marriage in Edinburgh, Scotland. In 1854 she acted in Honour before Titles at the St. James's Vanette. She joined the Princess's Theatre in London, where she worked under Charles Kean. In 1856 she played Hermia in A Midsummer Night's Dream. Henry Morley described her work in A Midsummer Night's Dream as "whimsical" and described her as "fair". The next year, Bufton was in The Tempest, performing the role of Ferdinand. Her performance as Ferdinand, a male character, is believed to be the first time a woman played Ferdinand publicly. Bufton performed as Regan in King Lear at the Princess's Theatre, too.

== Work at the Royal Strand ==
She then worked for the Royal Strand Theatre. She married Arthur Swanborough, who was the son of the theatre's manager, Ada Swanborough, in 1860. Bufton performed in Post-boy in 1860, in the role of Miss Wharton. She also performed other roles in burlesques at the Strand. In 1866, she played Hero in Much Ado About Nothing at the St James's Theatre. Bufton also performed roles in The Rivals and Road to Ruin. She created roles in the W. S. Gilbert plays Dulcamara and Randall's Thumb, and appeared in the first stage adaptation of Charles Dickens' novel Great Expectations as Estelle, also written by Gilbert.

== Later career ==
In April 1868 she became manager of the refurbished Greenwich Theatre. In her opening speech/poem, she referred to its heritage in the Richardson's travelling theatre at the annual Greenwich Fair, and offered enfranchisement to those whom even John Stuart Mill and the women's suffrage movement could not empower.

Her career was halted after she was injured in a railway accident. The accident was at South Kensington Station on 2 August 1871 when Bufton was thrown to the floor following a collision, she had an injury to the knee and a cut on the forehead. She was unconscious for a time, and she was given £1600 in compensation. Bufton suffered from memory loss. She was able to act again after two years. She performed in Book the Third, Chapter the First, Widow Hunt, and the revival of Betsy. A benefit performance was held in her honour at the Theatre Royal, Drury Lane in 1872. During that performance, she performed as Constance in Love Chase.

== Death and legacy ==
Bufton died at the age of 50 in The Strand, London, from bronchitis. She is buried at the Brompton Cemetery. She and her husband had two daughters.
