= Edward Righton (actor) =

English actor

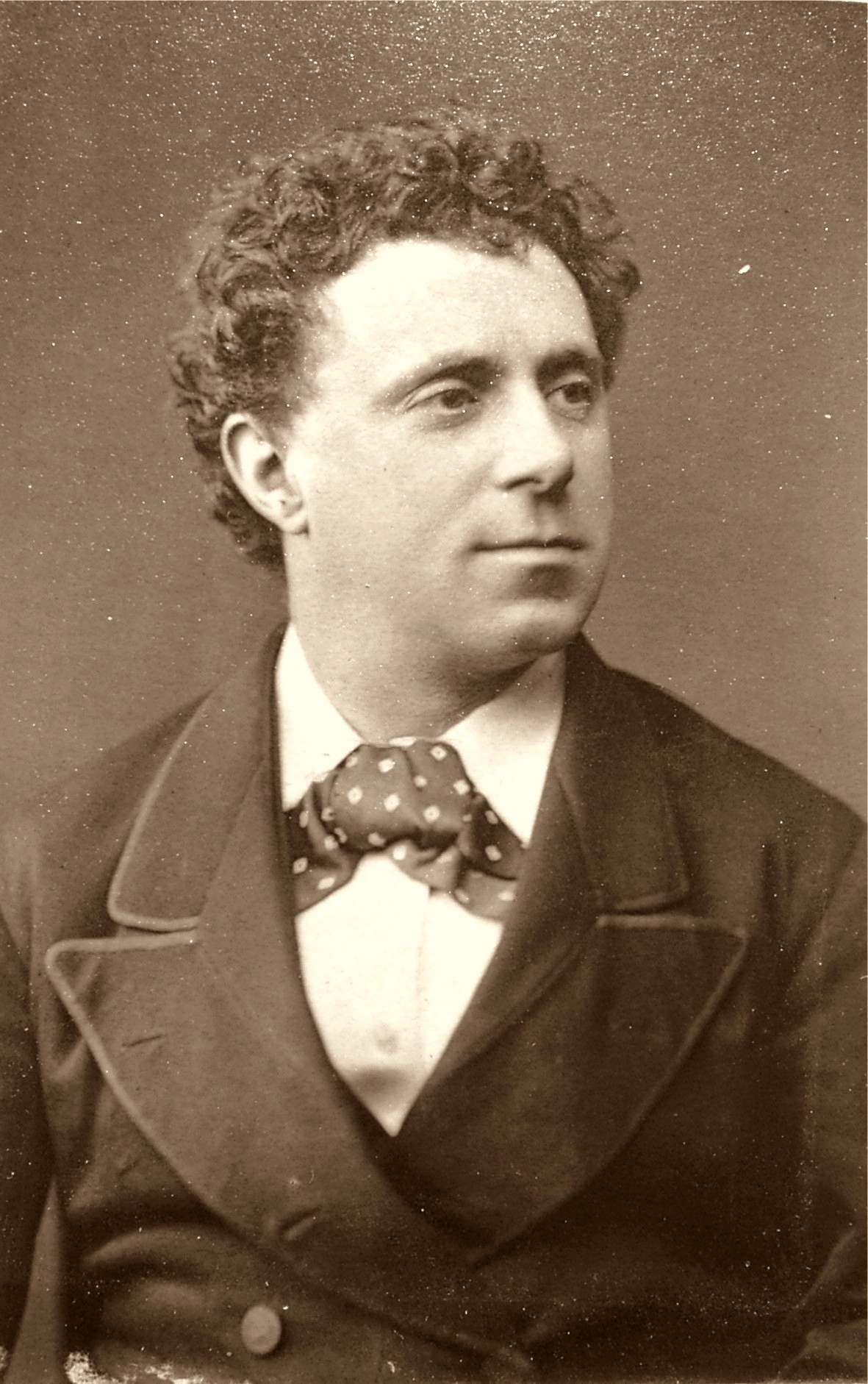
Edward Righton

Thomas Edward Corrie Burns Righton (1838 – January 1899), known as Edward Righton, was an English actor.

Righton began his career in Liverpool in 1850. Among many other London roles, Righton played the role of Verges in Much Ado About Nothing and Mr. Furnivail in Two Roses. He created the role of Lutin in The Happy Land, a musical burlesque written in 1872 by W. S. Gilbert. He also created the role of Boomblehardt in Gilbert's Creatures of Impulse. In 1876, he appeared in The Great Divorce Case, a comedy, opposite Charles Wyndham. In The Dead Heart, he played the comic barber, and in John O'Keeffe's comedy Wild Oats, he filled the role of an old sea dog.
