= The Happy Land =

Play by W. S. Gilbert and Gilbert Arthur à Beckett

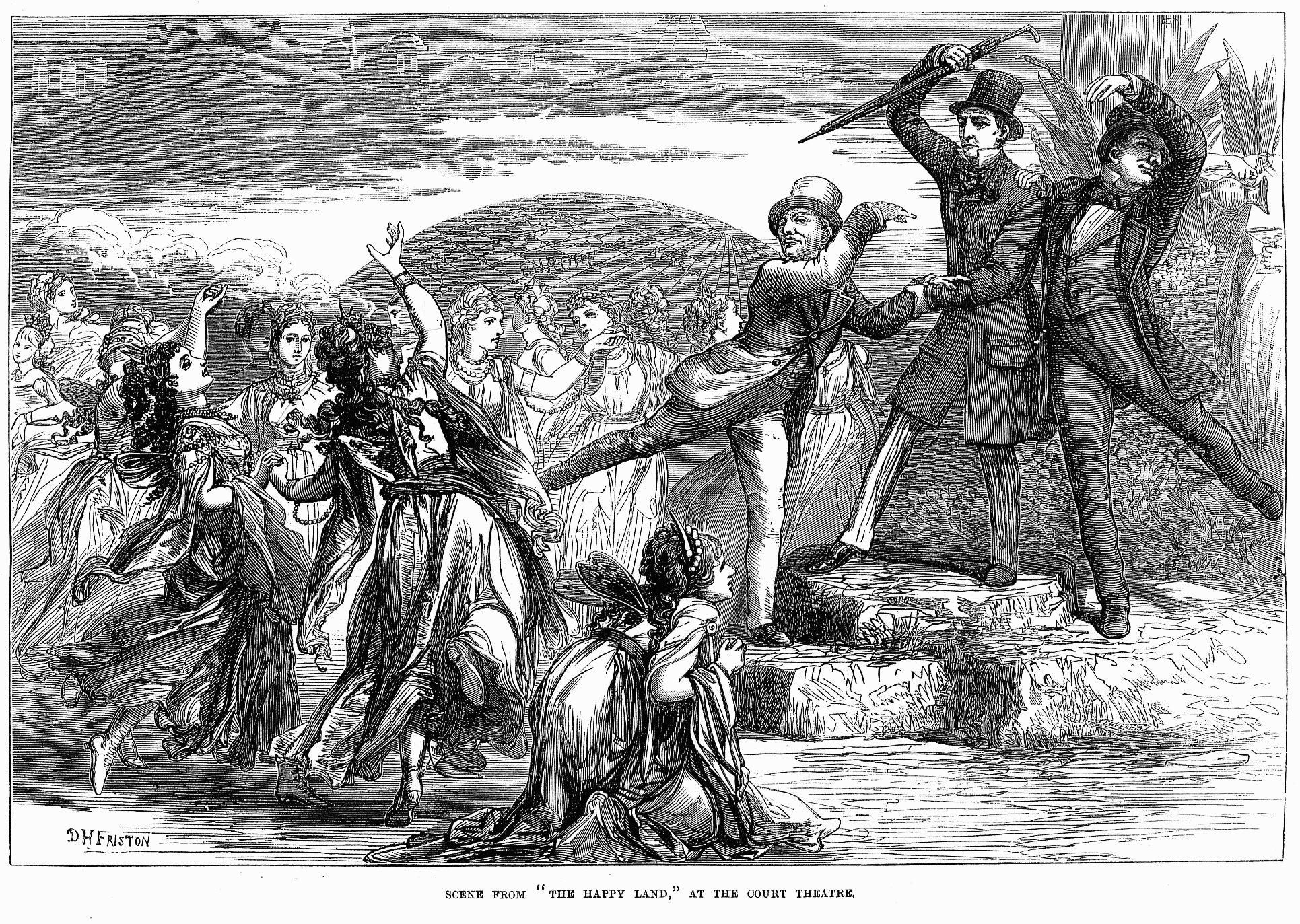
Scene from The Happy Land, showing the impersonation of Gladstone, Lowe, and Ayrton (from The Illustrated London News of 22 March 1873; illustrated by D. H. Friston)

The Happy Land is a play with music written in 1873 by W. S. Gilbert (under the pseudonym F. Latour Tomline) and Gilbert Arthur à Beckett. The musical play burlesques Gilbert's earlier play, The Wicked World. The blank verse piece opened at the Royal Court Theatre on 3 March 1873 and enjoyed a highly successful run, soon touring, and then being immediately revived at the same theatre in the autumn of 1873.

The play created a scandal by breaking regulations against the portrayal of public characters, parodying William Ewart Gladstone, Robert Lowe, and Acton Smee Ayrton, respectively the Prime Minister, Chancellor of the Exchequer, and First Commissioner of Works. Three characters were made up and costumed to look like the caricatures of Gladstone, Lowe and Ayrton that had appeared in Vanity Fair. The scandal was great enough to be included in the Annual Register's "Chronicle of Remarkable Occurrences." The play was censored by Britain's Lord Chamberlain, which ironically caused it to become unusually popular.

The Happy Land also anticipated some of the themes in the political satire seen in the Gilbert and Sullivan operas, including unqualified people in positions of authority, like Sir Joseph in H.M.S. Pinafore, selecting government by "competitive examination" as in Iolanthe, and especially the importation of English exemplars to "improve" a naive civilisation, as in Utopia, Limited.

== Background ==
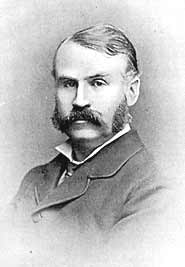
W.S. Gilbert in about 1870

The year before the play opened, Gilbert told The Era, "As I consider that I am quite as well qualified to judge of what is fit for the ears of a theatrical audience as [the Licenser of Plays] can be, I have systematically declined to take the slightest notice of his instructions". The Happy Land is a blank verse musical burlesque of Gilbert's earlier play, The Wicked World. The plot roughly follows that of The Wicked World, with the disastrous powers of love replaced with the disaster of "popular government".

As in The Wicked World and several other Gilbert works, the play concerns chaos that is wreaked in Fairyland when an element of life in the mortal world is imported. In The Wicked World, this element is "mortal love", while in The Happy Land, it is "popular government", which is delivered to Fairyland by Gladstone, Lowe, and Ayrton. Stedman calls this a "Gilbertian invasion plot". The three men depicted, and clearly identified by their make-up and by costumes designed after contemporary cartoons in Vanity Fair, were, respectively, Britain's Prime Minister, Chancellor of the Exchequer and First Commissioner of Works. The three characters were described in the cast list as Mr. G., Mr. L., and Mr. A. Gladstone's government is portrayed as mean and uncaring of Britain's national interests, degrading British prestige abroad. The three men are seen to lack substance and taste. The daring political attack was almost unprecedented on the English stage. The opening night response was described by Edward Righton, who played "Mr. A.":

"[As we] appeared, rising through the clouds, there burst upon us another gale of boisterous merriment, which increased and increased in volume as we rose higher and higher, until the three figures from Vanity Fair stood on the stage; then the applause resembled the roaring of cannon or claps of thunder."

The Prince of Wales, attended the play on its opening night at the Court Theatre on 3 March 1873. Appalled at this attack on the government of which his mother the Queen was the titular head, he notified Lord Sydney, the Lord Chamberlain and Britain's official censor at the time, about the nature of the play. Three days later, on 6 March, the Lord Chamberlain revoked the play's performance licence, while a public inquiry was begun. This found that "the piece licensed and the piece acted were virtually different productions, unwarrantable alterations and enlargements having been introduced at the rehearsals, which the Lord Chamberlain would never have authorised."

Comparing the licensed copy, which he had approved, with the prompt copy, which was performed, the Lord Chamberlain claimed in a Memorandum that "in the prompter's copy there were eighteen quarto pages of additions, interpolations, and deviations from the original licensed text; and that in the original [manuscript] there was no indication whatsoever to point the allusions to individuals.... The manager expressed regret at what had occurred, and begged that the piece might be allowed to be performed as originally licensed, promising to adhere verbatim to the text, and to avoid anything which should convert the general allusions into personalities" including the make up of the actors. The theatre was only dark for two or three nights before the play was allowed to reopen. However, Marie Litton, the theatre's manager, claimed that the eighteen pages were merely the number that contained a modification of some sort, and that she believed it was acceptable as it was being done elsewhere. She also published the script as it was originally performed – with the cut sections written in all capital letters, and posted a notice that read:

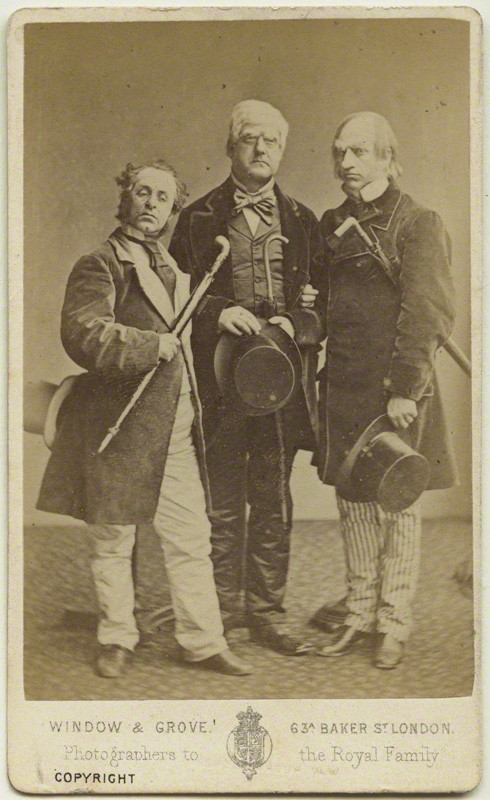
Righton, Hill and Fisher parodying Ayrton, Lowe and Gladstone

Notice. – The Happy Land. – Miss Litton begs to inform the public that the Lord Chamberlain has forbidden Messrs. Fisher, Hill, and Righton to make up their faces in imitation of Messrs. Gladstone, Lowe, and Ayrton. – Royal Court Theatre, 6 March.

The scandal, which was great enough to be included in the Annual Register's "Chronicle of Remarkable Occurrences", generated widespread publicity for the play, and, even without the makeup, everyone knew who was really being portrayed. In fact, wrote The Times, "the Lord Chamberlain has proved a mighty instructor ... everybody perfectly knows whom [the three actors] are intended to represent, and every line they utter is the signal for an approving roar." The critics mostly praised the piece, although papers disagreed on whether or not the stage should be more subject to censorship than the press. For instance, The Manchester Guardian wrote that the satire made "Many a brilliant sally at the supposed short-comings of the present government." Meanwhile, Gilbert was having some trouble keeping up the pseudonym. Shirley Brooks may have thought F. Tomline was Henry Labouchère, but reviewers and others were beginning to link him with Gilbert. Worse, Gilbert's friend and collaborator Frederic Clay began vigorously defending him against the absolutely true allegations, forcing Gilbert to quietly take him into his confidence. The Athenaeum commented that the play was "written with such talent, and catching very well the very spirit of Mr. Gilbert's manner and method that we cannot but suspect that the interest of Mr. Gilbert in it has not stopped with mere superintendence of stage management, as announced." The play became one of the big hits of the season, running for 142 performances until the theatre closed for summer renovations on 9 August 1873. It then enjoyed a lengthy provincial tour and being immediately revived when the theatre reopened on 14 October 1873.

However, for the Lord Chamberlain, the whole affair was a fiasco. His action "raised the question of censorship of the stage in an acute form" and questions about why only the stage should be subject to censorship began to be asked in quarters beyond the theatre: one parliamentarian, Sir Lawrence Palk, MP for East Devon threatened to bring it up in the House of Commons, and some suggested that the Lord Chamberlain was demonstrating political bias in his censorship of the play. One historian wrote that the play:

revealed in a clear and popular form the conservative Tory anguish as the balance of political power tilted away from the aristocracy, and land owners, and the upper middle class, and toward the lower middle class and the workers. Gilbert, in his topsy-turvy manner, stigmatized the ethics and morality of popular government, as the Liberal program was called, and predicted the dire consequences for England of this innovation. Governmental wisdom and virtue could rise no higher than their source, and under popular government the source was the new electorate, motivated by profit, greed, and the crude desires of the mob. At home the quality of British life would sink to the level of the cheap and nasty, and abroad, good-bye to national honor. England under the Liberals was on the way to becoming a second rate power, at the mercy of its mightier neighbors across the channel. According to Gilbert, this was the gloomy outlook for Great Britain under popular government, and it reflected, as the critical reception of The Happy Land showed, a large body of contemporary opinion.

Gilbert returned to the West End later that year with a new play, The Realm of Joy, set in the lobby of a theatre performing The Happy Land, which rehashed aspects of the scandal, even going so far as to attack the Lord Chamberlain himself, referring to him as "The Lord High Disinfectant". The whole affair had proved such a political liability for the Lord Chamberlain, however, that he had no choice but to order The Realm of Joy to be licensed, with only the "usual changes". Nevertheless, Gilbert never again directed his satire against specific persons: rather, he aimed his "hose of common sense" at types, such as Sir Joseph in H.M.S. Pinafore, the Major-General in The Pirates of Penzance and Ko-Ko in The Mikado, who are incompetent persons that have risen to a high government position. In later years, Gilbert appears to have become ashamed of the subversive tone of The Happy Land: in 1909, testifying to a joint committee on stage censorship, he said that his "maturer judgement" on the play was that the Lord Chamberlain's "interference was absolutely justified". It was not until 1968 that the power of the Lord Chamberlain to censor plays was revoked.

== Roles and original cast ==
Male Fairies

- Ethais – Walter H. Fisher
- Phyllon – W. J. Hill
- Lutin – Edward Righton

Mortal Counterparts

- The Right Honourable Mr. G. – Walter H. Fisher
- The Right Honourable Mr. L. – W. J. Hill
- The Right Honourable Mr. A. – Edward Righton

Female Fairies

- Selene – Helen Barry
- Zayda – Lottie Venne
- Darine – Bella Moore
- Neodie – R. Clair
- Locrine – G. Clair
- Leila – L. Henderson

== Synopsis ==
Act I

The fairies live in a lavish and art-filled Fairyland, floating on a cloud overlooking the mortal world. Three male fairies, Ethais, Phylion and Lutin, relate to the female fairies their "detestation" at their experiences below, in the "wicked" world. However, they note the conveniences of Victorian civilisation. The female fairies suspect that the males may not hate the mortal world as much as they say, and complain of the dullness of life in Fairyland, and long to experience that wonderful, wicked world. Selene, the Fairy Queen, expresses a determination to go to Earth. The three males resist this and instead agree to return to the world themselves and ask the Fairy King (who is in England studying "political economy", also known as "spending a pound to save a penny") to send three mortals up to Fairyland, so that the fairies may find out what men are really like. While the female fairies wait for the three mortals, Selene explains why England has an advantage over other countries: it enjoys a "popular government".

The three mortal statesmen arrive – Mr. G., Mr. L. and Mr. A – declaring, "Oh, we are three most popular men! We want to know who'll turn us out!" At first, Fairyland is not to their liking, as it is decorated with "ridiculous extravagance", but they change their minds as soon as they find themselves surrounded by the female fairies. The women are charmed by the mortals' oratorical virtuosity. At the fairies' request, they explain how "popular government" works. The fairies decide to introduce popular government into Fairyland. The fairies are divided into Government and Opposition, and the members of the Opposition are sent away grumbling. Then, ministerial posts are allocated after a competitive examination in which those who show that they are the least fitted for the particular duties are appointed to fill them. For example, the fairy who asks what a ship may be is appointed First Lord of the Admiralty. All the fairies want to be Prime Minister, but, following precedent, Selene is so appointed.

Act II

The fairies' experiment in "popular government" is a disaster. Penny-pinching and shabbiness rule the state, the military is in disarray, and the Chinese may soon invade. Leila and the other Opposition fairies revolt, and all the Government ministers resign. Selene appeals to Mr. A., who suggests that "patriotism is the ladder by which the rising statesman ascends to the pinnacle of place," and "place is the pinnacle seated upon which the risen statesman kicks away the ladder of patriotism." Selene replies, "Sisters, I've done with office, give me a peerage and let me end my days in respectability and peace." Mr. G. advises that even in this situation, she should not consider resigning or apologising; but Selene ultimately rejects this, although she has feelings for Mr. G.

The three mortal honourables return to earth, as they must attend a cabinet meeting. When the fairies realise that the mortals were corrupt, they exclaim, "How shabby!" Soon the three male fairies return with news from the Fairy King: they may enjoy the privilege of "popular government." Selene rejects this with horror. The fairies will "Leave such blessings to a happy land."

== Musical numbers ==
Act I

- Opening Duo and Chorus (Zayda, Darine and Chorus) – "Lullaby Fairyland"
- Trio (Ethais, Phyllon and Lutin) – "We are three unhappy fairies"
- Quintette and Chorus (Zayda, Darine, Ethais, Phyllon and Lutin) – "Send us up from yonder wicked den"
- Trio (Mr. G., Mr. L., Mr. A.) – "We are three statesmen old and tried"
- Finale – "By playing loose and fast"

Act II

- Ensemble – "When every single art you've tried"
- Finale – "Our little feet we never show"

== Antecedents and development of Gilbertian satire ==
Gilbert created several blank verse "fairy comedies" at the Haymarket Theatre in the early 1870s beginning with The Palace of Truth (1870) and Pygmalion and Galatea (1871). The Wicked World was the third of these, and The Happy Land followed so soon on its heels that the two plays ran simultaneously. The plot of The Happy Land and The Wicked World clearly fascinated Gilbert. Not only had he written a short story on the theme in 1871, but he returned to it in his 1909 comic opera, Fallen Fairies. Indeed, the general theme of mortals disturbing the peaceful state of affairs in fairyland is featured in a number of other Gilbert works, including the Gilbert and Sullivan opera Iolanthe (1882).

Gilbert followed The Happy Land with The Realm of Joy, set in the lobby of a theatre performing a thinly-disguised The Happy Land, which directly parodies the scandal, even describing the costumes used. In The Happy Land, The Realm of Joy (1873) and Charity (1874), Gilbert stretched the boundaries of how far social commentary could go in the Victorian theatre. The Realm of Joy poked many jokes at the Lord Chamberlain. Charity critiqued the contrasting ways in which Victorian society treated men and women who had sex outside of marriage, which anticipated the 'problem plays' of Shaw and Ibsen.

The Happy Land is an example of Gilbert's "repeated ridicule of idealistic panaceas for curing social ills [among which was] Gilbert's conception of popular government as an impractical theory. In the operas these schemes range from the notion that "true love [is] the source of every earthly joy," in The Sorcerer; through the prescription of "Republican [equality]" as a remedy for social ills in The Gondoliers; to the systematic plan for political and social reforms brought from England by the Flowers of Progress for the benefit, and ultimate corruption, of the south sea island kingdom of Utopia in Utopia Limited" and its salvation through the institution of party politics.
