= Royalty Theatre =

Former theatre in London, England

- 1840 Miss Kelly's Theatre and Dramatic School; 1850 (Royal) Soho Theatre; 1850 New English Opera House; 1861 New Royalty Theatre
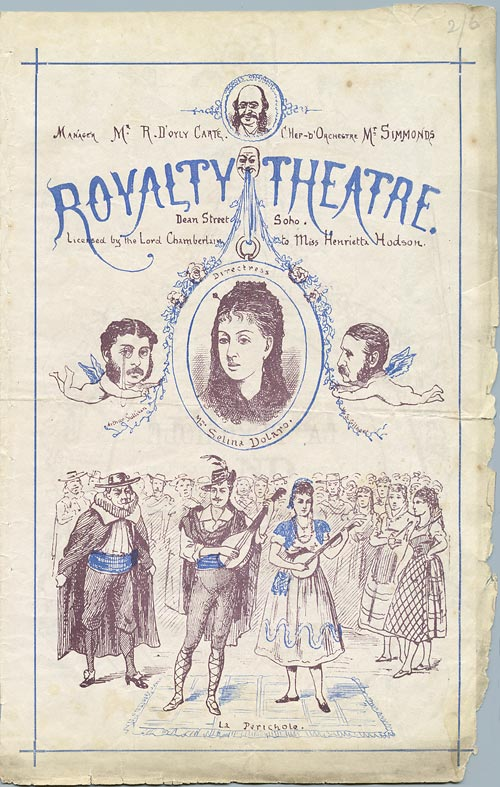
- Programme cover for La Périchole and Trial by Jury (1875)
- Interactive map of Royalty Theatre
- Address: Dean Street, Soho; Westminster, London, England
- Coordinates: 51.513917°N 0.13279°W
- Owner: Frances Maria Kelly
- Capacity: 657 seats (1906)
- Type: Theatre and opera
- Designation: Demolished
- Current use: Site occupied by office block

Construction
- Opened: 25 May 1840
- Closed: 25 November 1938
- Rebuilt: 1883 Thomas Verity (alterations)
- Architect: Samuel Beazley

The Royalty Theatre was a small London theatre situated at 73 Dean Street, Soho. Established by the actress Frances Maria Kelly in 1840, it opened as Miss Kelly's Theatre and Dramatic School and finally closed to the public in 1938. The architect was Samuel Beazley. The theatre's opening was ill-fated, and it was little used for a decade. It changed its name twice and was used by an opera company, amateur drama companies and for French pieces.

In 1861, it was renamed the New Royalty Theatre, and the next year it was leased by Mrs Charles Selby, who enlarged it from 200 seats to about 650. The theatre continued to change hands frequently. In the 1860s, it featured F. C. Burnand's burlesque of Black-Eyed Susan, which ran for nearly 500 nights, and a burlesque by W. S. Gilbert, The Merry Zingara. The theatre was managed by Henrietta Hodson during the early 1870s, who also produced mostly burlesques and comedies, including Gilbert's The Realm of Joy and Ought We to Visit Her? On 25 March 1875 the Royalty, under the direction of Selina Dolaro, enjoyed an historic success with Trial by Jury.

In 1877, Kate Santley took control of the theatre, running it for nearly 30 years. She had the theatre rebuilt and it reopened in 1883. In this period, it featured opera-bouffes adapted from the French. M. L. Mayer and plays in French. It was increasingly hard for the theatre to compete with larger new London theatres. In 1891, the theatre started a policy of modern drama, presenting plays by Ibsen and George Bernard Shaw. When the theatre finally had a great success, with Charley's Aunt in 1892, its popularity led to its transference after only a month to a larger theatre. In 1895–96 the theatre underwent another renovation. Arthur Bourchier's The Chili Widow ran for over 300 nights. In the new century, Mrs Patrick Campbell played at the theatre. After another renovation in 1906, Sarah Bernhardt led her own company in a season. In 1912, Milestones, by Arnold Bennett and Edward Knoblauch had over 600 performances. The Man Who Stayed at Home played for 584 performances.

The Co-Optimists played at the theatre after the war as did Noël Coward's The Vortex. In 1932, While Parents Sleep was a hit. The theatre closed in 1938 and was demolished in 1953.

== Origins ==
The actress Frances Maria "Fanny" Kelly used the fortune saved from her highly popular career to establish a dramatic academy with a 200-seat theatre attached. The architect of the theatre was Samuel Beazley. The theatre and school were completed in 1837. Kelly's engineer friend, Rowland Macdonald Stephenson, persuaded her to build into the theatre new machinery that he had invented to move the stage and scenery; theoretically a significant step forward in theatre technology. It took more than two years to install the machinery in the theatre. The theatre was "obscurely sited [and] perilously combustible", but it had "a relatively spacious stage, and Beazley's work in the auditorium was thought pretty." The Times described the fashionable little theatre as "most elegantly fitted up and appointed, and painted in a light tasteful manner."

It turned out that the machinery was too heavy to be worked by people, and Stephenson had to use a horse. On the opening night, 25 May 1840, three pieces were presented: Summer and Winter, by Morris Barnett; a melodrama, The Sergeant's Wife; and a farce, The Midnight Hour. The opening was unsuccessful, and within a week the theatre was closed. Kelly's high admission charges of five or seven shillings did not help, but the main problem was that the tramping of the horse and the roar of the machinery drowned out the voices of the actors and caused the building to vibrate. The theatre had to be demolished to remove the machinery. After it was rebuilt, Kelly reopened the theatre in February 1841, at reduced prices, for a season of her own monologues, but then became ill. She sought to lease the theatre, but it was empty for long periods and was used mostly for amateur productions, including one of Charles Dickens's productions. Within a decade, Kelly had lost her entire fortune and was evicted from the property.

In January 1850 the theatre was reopened as the Royal Soho Theatre, after redecoration by W. W. Deane and S. J. Nicholl, changing its name to the New English Opera House from November 1850, and in the following year an entrance portico was built. Various types of productions played at the theatre, including English Grand Opera. Performances were mostly by amateurs, hiring the theatre at standard rates. At other times, as the Theatre Français, it attracted patrons chiefly among the foreigners in Soho.

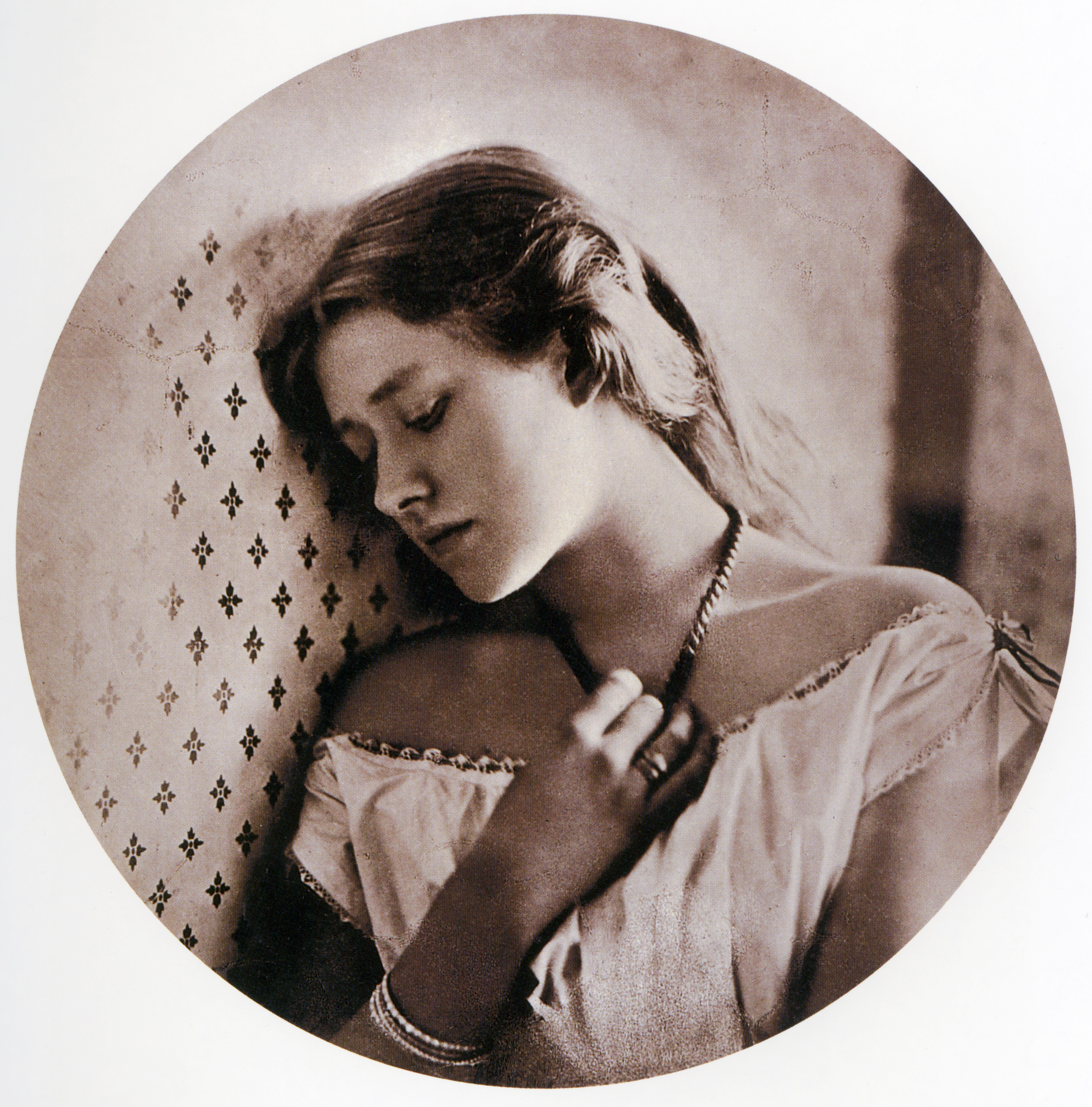
Ellen Terry at 16 in 1864.

In 1861, the direction of the theatre was assumed by Albina di Rhona, a Serbian ballerina and comic actress. She renamed it the New Royalty Theatre, and had it altered and redecorated by "M. Bulot, of Paris, Decorator in Ordinary to his Imperial Majesty, Louis Napoleon", with "cut-glass lustres, painted panels, blue satin draperies and gold mouldings". In the opening programme, di Rhona danced, the leader of the Boston Brass Band from America played a bugle solo, and a melodrama, Atar Gull, was performed, with a 14-year-old Ellen Terry in the cast. Still, the reopening was not a success.

In 1862, the theatre was leased by, Mrs Charles Selby, who also ran an acting school. She enlarged the original theatre to accommodate about 650 people. She used it to showcase her pupils and occasionally rented it to others. The theatre continued to change hands frequently. It was managed, from 1866 to 1870, by Martha Cranmer Oliver, who featured mostly burlesques, including F. C. Burnand's burlesque of Black-Eyed Susan, which ran for nearly 500 nights, and a burlesque by W. S. Gilbert, The Merry Zingara. The theatre was managed by Henrietta Hodson during the early 1870s. She also produced mostly burlesques and comedies, including Gilbert's The Realm of Joy and Ought We to Visit her? In 1872, it became known as the Royalty Theatre and retained this name (although it was occasionally known as the New Royalty Theatre).

On 25 March 1875 the theatre, under the direction of Madame Selina Dolaro, enjoyed an historic success with Trial by Jury, the first Gilbert and Sullivan opera produced by Richard D'Oyly Carte. It premiered together with Jacques Offenbach's La Périchole and another one-act farce, Cryptoconchoidsyphonostomata. Carte soon moved his Gilbert and Sullivan company to another theatre. In January 1876 at the Royalty, Pauline Rita appeared under Carte's management as Gustave Muller in The Duke's Daughter.

== The Santley years ==
In 1877, Kate Santley "seems to have acquired the head lease." She controlled the theatre for nearly 30 years. Carte joined forces with Santley in January 1877 to present Lischen and Fritzen, Jacques Offenbach's Orpheus in the Underworld, and Carte's own operetta, Happy Hampstead written with his secretary, Frank Desprez. Later that year, the First Chief Officer of the London Fire Brigade strongly recommended that the theatre be closed. Santley had the theatre rebuilt, hiring architect Thomas Verity, who provided additional exits, and it reopened in 1883, with Santley receiving praise for the renovations. Many of the productions in these years were opera-bouffes adapted from the French. M. L. Mayer, formerly of the Gaiety Theatre, staged twice-yearly seasons of plays in French. The Coquelins and other luminaries of the Comédie-Française appeared here in the 1880s, when the Royalty was 'the recognized home of the Parisian drama.' The opening of Shaftesbury Avenue and of larger new theatres in that neighbourhood, including the Lyric Theatre and the Apollo Theatre, drew audiences away from the Royalty, and in the 1890s the Royalty was not prospering.

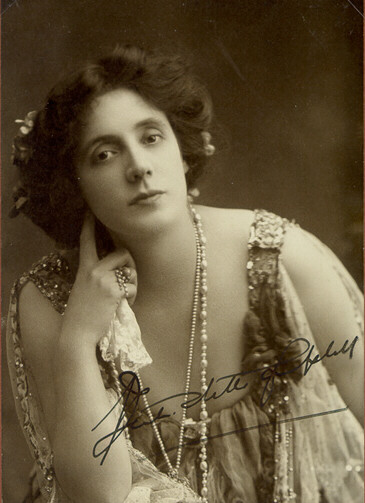
Mrs Patrick Campbell

In 1891, the theatre started a policy of modern drama. Ibsen's Ghosts premièred, to predictable outrage, at the theatre, in a single private London performance on 13 March 1891. The Lord Chamberlain's Office censorship was avoided by the formation of a subscription-only Independent Theatre Society, which included Thomas Hardy and Henry James among its members. Again, for the Society, George Bernard Shaw premièred Widowers' Houses, his first play, here the following year. When the theatre finally had a great success, with Brandon Thomas's play Charley's Aunt in 1892, its popularity led to its transference after only a month to the larger Globe Theatre.

In 1895–96 the Royalty's manager was Arthur Bourchier, and the theatre underwent another renovation, by architect Walter Emden. Bourchier produced, among other plays, The Chili Widow, an adaptation of his own that ran for over 300 nights. In 1899, the first production of the Incorporated Stage Society took place with the first performance of Shaw's You Never Can Tell. In 1900–01 Mrs Patrick Campbell hired the theatre and staged a succession of contemporary plays in which she starred, and in 1903–04 Hans Andresen and Max Behrend presented a successful season of German theatre. Also in 1904, the newly founded Irish National Theatre Society gave plays by W. B. Yeats and, in 1905, it presented an early performance of Synge's first play, The Shadow of the Glen. In addition, Philip Carr's Mermaid Society produced Elizabethan and Jacobean plays.

== Later years ==
Again, the theatre was threatened with closure by the authorities, but Santley had it rebuilt again in 1906 to meet safety requirements. After redecoration in French Regency style, which increased the capacity of the theatre to 657 seats, the Royalty reopened on 4 January 1906 with a season of Theatre Français directed by Gaston Mayer. Sarah Bernhardt led her own company in La Tosca, Phedre and La Dame aux Camelias in 1907. In 1911, J. E. Vedrenne and Dennis Eadie acquired the theatre, and in 1912, they staged Milestones, by Arnold Bennett and Edward Knoblauch (later Knoblock), which had over 600 performances. Owen Nares, Gladys Cooper and Lynn Fontanne appeared at the theatre early in their careers. The Man Who Stayed at Home was a hit at the Royalty in 1914, playing for 584 performances. Henry Daniell starred as Bobby Gilmour in The Man from Toronto at the theatre in May 1918.

A post-war success was the concert-party entertainment, The Co-Optimists, first staged in 1921. The year 1924 saw the first West End production at the theatre of Noël Coward's The Vortex. Juno and the Paycock was mounted in 1925, and Ibsen's Pillars of Society played in 1926. Another hit for the Royalty was in 1932 with While Parents Sleep. By 1936 the danger of fire from celluloid stores and other adjacent properties overrided the argument made to the Lord Chamberlain that the theatre had been on the site before the development of the inflammatory trades nearby. J. B. Priestley's I Have Been Here Before was the theatre's last success. The last performance was given at a matinee on 25 November 1938, by the Southern Cross Players.

Although several schemes were considered for its rebuilding, but with the growing threat of war, the theatre remained empty and soon became derelict. It was damaged in the World War II Blitz. The Royalty was demolished in 1953 and a block of offices, Royalty House, was erected on the site.

A modern Royalty Theatre was opened in the basement of an office block at Portugal Street near Aldwych in 1960. This was bought by the London School of Economics and renamed the Peacock Theatre in 1996. It is a lecture hall by day and a venue for the Sadler's Wells Theatre company by night.

Advertising postcard, 1912

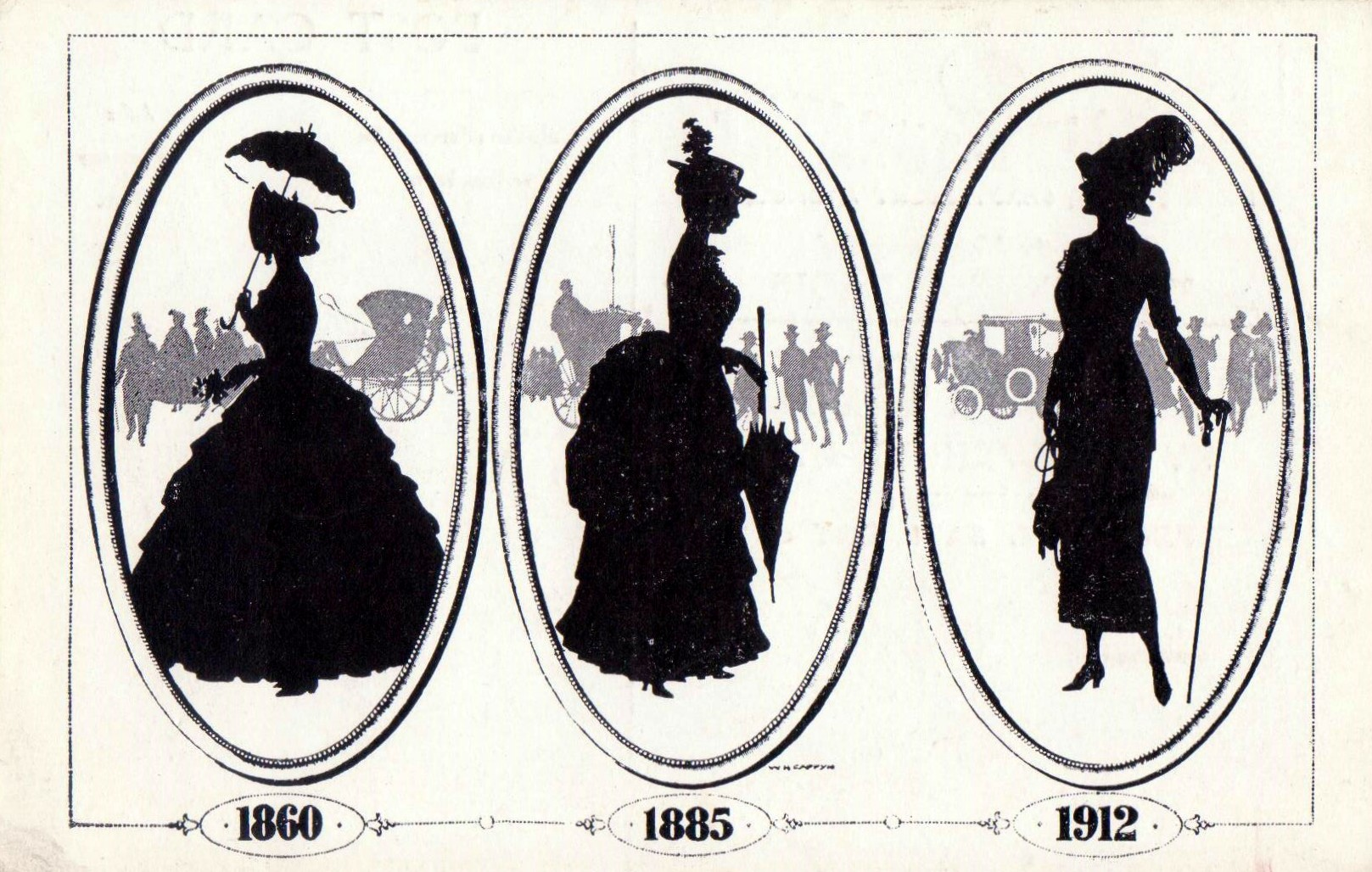

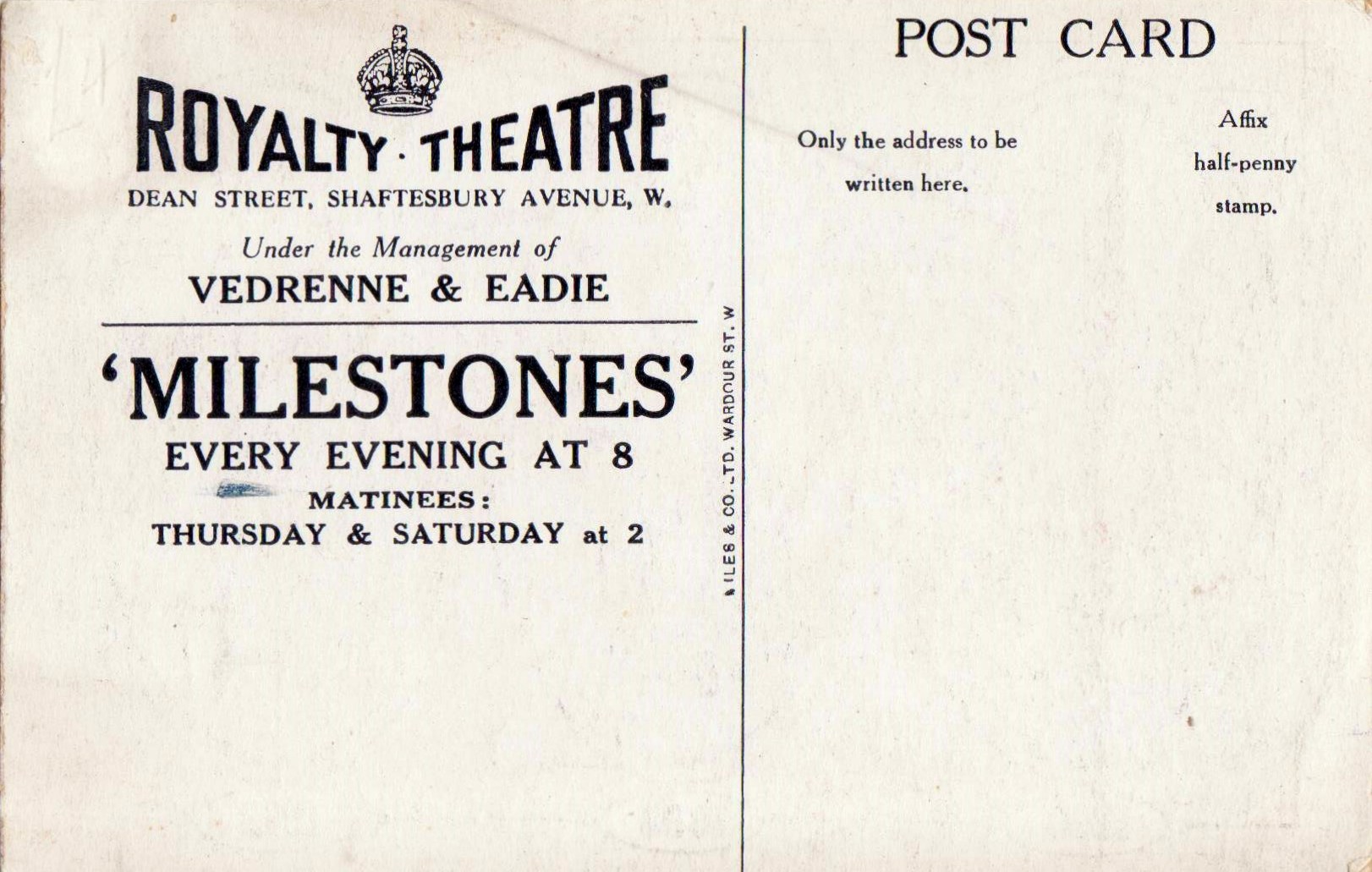
