= Linda Verner =

British singer and actress

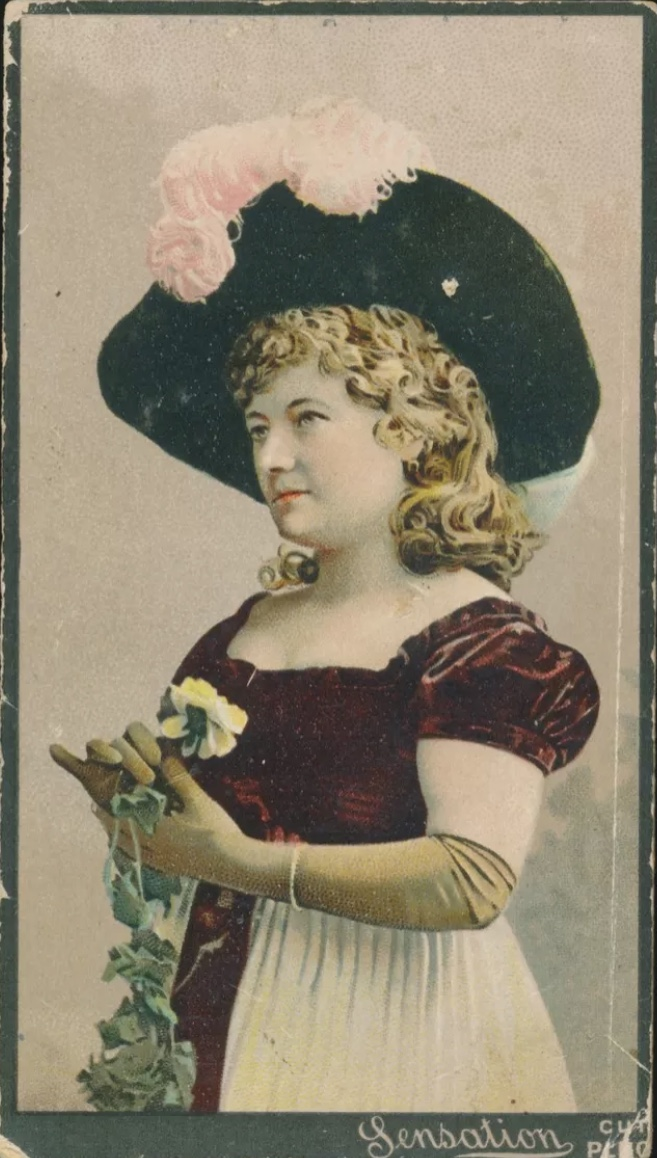
Linda Verner on an American trade card (1889)

Linda Verner (25 September 1855 – 24 August 1892) was a British singer and actress of the Victorian era who appeared in operetta, pantomime, Victorian burlesque and other comic and musical works in London and on tour in Britain and abroad from the 1870s to the early 1890s.

== Early life and career ==
She was born Hannah Sarah Palmer in Lambeth, London, in 1855, one of five children born to Hannah Sophia née Newton (1814–1907) and Thomas William Palmer (1814–1877). On joining the acting company of Selina Dolaro, Verner appeared in The Black Prince (1874) at London's St James's Theatre. Dolaro became the lessee and star performer at the Royalty Theatre in London, with Richard D'Oyly Carte as her business manager. There on 25 March 1875 Verner appeared in a triple bill in which she created the small role of the First Bridesmaid in the original production of Gilbert and Sullivan's Trial by Jury; in the same evening, she was Polly in Charles Collette's Cryptoconchoidsyphonostomata and Guadelen and Mannelita in Offenbach's La Périchole. On subsequent evenings, she continued in the same roles in two of those works but appeared as Cecile in The Secret, which replaced Cryptoconchoidsyphonostomata on the bill at the Royalty. In July 1875 she was promoted to the leading role of the Plaintiff in Trial by Jury, replacing Nellie Bromley.

Verner continued to play the Plaintiff in Trial at the Royalty Theatre and later on tour until October 1875 when the Company returned to the Royalty, where she appeared as the Plaintiff until 18 December 1875. Verner was at the Globe Theatre and Charing Cross Theatre from February to March 1876 under the joint management of Richard D'Oyly Carte (who had left the Royalty in October 1875) and George Dolby, for whom she appeared as Susan in A Blighted Being and Michel in The Duke's Daughter. She soon joined Emily Soldene to play in Geneviève de Brabant, was Princess Sabra in the pantomime at the Alexandra Palace and was Princess Balroubadour in the pantomime Aladdin at Liverpool.

== Marriage and next decade ==
On 3 January 1876 at the church of St George The Martyr in Southwark she married George Potier (1856–1908), a wheel band manufacturer. The couple had six children: Linda Annie Avis Potier (born 1876); Ruby Caroline Potier (1878–1953); Cecil William Louis Potier (born 1880); Ida Beatrice Potier (1881–1965); Vera Lydia Potier (1883–1982); and Mabel Lilian Potier (died 1968).

Linda Verner in the premiere of Ruy Blas and the Blasé Roué (1889)

After her marriage Verner continued to perform in London and in the provinces, in 1879 appearing with Dolaro in La Périchole and Another Drink, the latter with music by Edward Solomon, following which she travelled to Dublin with Lydia Thompson and appeared in more pantomime before returning to London and playing at the Opera Comique in Lila Clay’s all-woman company in the operetta An Adamless Eden (1882). In August 1884 she briefly joined a D'Oyly Carte touring company playing Lady Psyche in Princess Ida. In 1886 Verner was in Herne the Hunted, played Arabella in Billee Taylor at Toole's Theatre, Madeleine in the comic opera Le postillon de Lonjumeau at the Empire Theatre, and appeared opposite Florence St. John in La Béarnaise.

== Later years ==
For George Edwardes she appeared at the Gaiety Theatre in London as Madame Gondelarieur in a revival of Miss Esmeralda and played Carconte in Monte Cristo Jr. in which, with Miss Esmeralda, she toured the United States for Edwardes from November 1888 to June 1889. On her return to the Gaiety she was the Duchess Agio Uncertanti in Ruy Blas and the Blasé Roué (1889–90); Yolande of Bar in Joan of Arc, or the Merry Maid of Orleans by Adrian Ross and J. L. Shine at the Opera Comique (1891) opposite Marion Hood in the title role; Poplin in one matinee performance of Stage Struck (May 1891); Ruth Ipgreve in one matinee performance of Guy Fawkes, Esq. at the Opera Comique (September 1891), and Florence Harcourt in That Lady in Pink at the Gaiety (January to March 1892). She also appeared in revivals of Little Jack Sheppard, Cinder Ellen up too Late and Carmen up to Data.

Verner joined a Gaiety burlesque company on a tour of South Africa where she died suddenly at Adelaide in August 1892. Edwardes and Gaiety Theatre performer Fred Leslie raised £100 to support her six children and her "long incapacitated" widower, George Potier. He nevertheless remarried a much younger wife in 1898 and with her had four more children before his death in 1908.
