= Charles Collett (disambiguation) =

Charles Collett (1871–1952) was a British railway engineer.

Charles Collett may also refer to:

- Charles E. Collett (1903–1968), American lawyer
- Charles Elmer Collett (born 1944), firefighter and American football player
- Sir Charles Collett, 1st Baronet (1864–1938), lord mayor of London

== See also ==
- Charles Collet (1888–1915), British naval airman
- Charles Collette (1842–1924), actor and composer
- Charles Hastings Collette (1816–1901), British solicitor and writer
- Collett (disambiguation)
