= Belville Robert Pepper =

British opera singer (1850–1888)

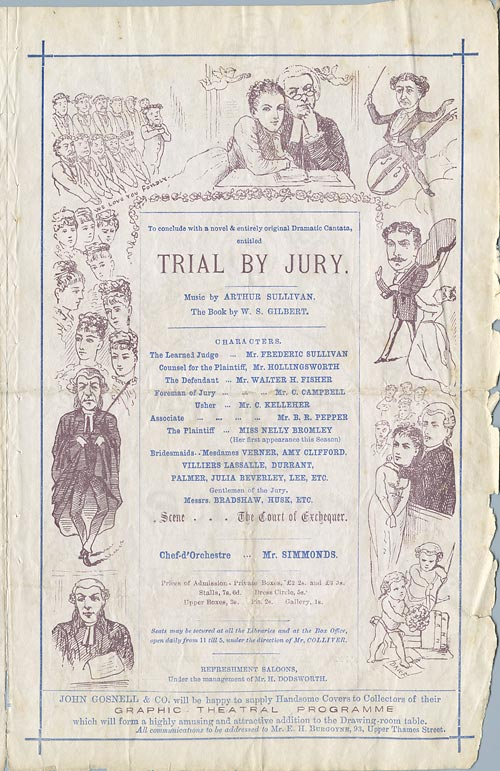
Cast list of Trial by Jury in a programme from April 1875: Pepper is the Associate.

Belville Robert Pepper (October 1850 – September 1888) was a bass-baritone known for creating the role of the Usher in the first production of Trial by Jury in 1875 at the Royalty Theatre in London.

== Life and career ==
Pepper was born in Marylebone, London, the youngest of three children born to Sarah née Carden (1824–1869) and Montague Pepper (1821–1854), a wood carver and gilder. Following his father's death in 1854, Pepper was sent as a boarder or "inmate" in the St Marylebone Parochial Schools. His mother died in his teens.

Pepper was a professional vocalist in the early 1870s and appeared with a company in Great Yarmouth in 1870. In 1872 he was playing in "Messrs B. Booth and R. B. Pepper's London Comedy and Burlesque Company"; he then joined Emily Soldene's company and eventually played the Burgomaster in Genevieve de Brabant, Cadet in La Fille de Madame Angot and Bonaventura in Madame l'archiduc. He also played at the Royalty Theatre and toured with Kate Santley. After creating the role of the Usher in Trial by Jury at the Royalty Theatre in London in March 1875, he was switched first to the role of Foreman and then to the non-singing role of the Associate in April 1875. At the same time Pepper was playing the small roles of the Usher and the Second Notary in Offenbach's La Perichole, which was the main attraction that Trial by Jury was supporting at the Royalty, and he also played the Porter in The Secret, a farce on the same bill during the run. Pepper appears to have left the Royalty in June 1875.

On 11 September 1877 Pepper married the dancer Elizabeth Mary Wilkinson (born 1856) at St. John's church in Manchester. From March to August 1878 he was sharing the role of the Foreman in Trial by Jury, in a touring company managed by D'Oyly Carte, as part of the first touring production of The Sorcerer. That Christmas season, he played Sandy Sixanate in the pantomime version of Puss in Boots in Glasgow, Scotland, where, in 1979, he sang in a concert of Paul Pry and played in Trial by Jury. The next Christmas, he was King Rat in Dick Whittington, then Usher again in Trial, followed by a tour of The Sultan of Mocha, together with his wife. After this he toured with Charles Wyndham in Innocents Abroad and with a D'Oyly Carte tour of Olivette. In 1881 Pepper and his wife, by then an actress, were appearing in Newcastle upon Tyne, and in 1882 he sang the role of Vanderprout in a touring production of Offenbach's Geneviève de Brabant. He also played in a pantomime in Todmorden over Christmas 1883.

Pepper died in Islington in London in 1888 at the age of 37.
