= Joseph Mendham =

Joseph Mendham (1769–1856) was an English clergyman and controversialist.

== Life ==
He was the eldest son of Robert Mendham, a merchant in Walbrook, London, who died at Highgate, Middlesex, 7 April 1810, aged 77, leaving a widow, who died there on 11 October 1812, at the age of 78. He matriculated at St Edmund Hall, Oxford, on 27 January 1789, and graduated B.A. 1792, M.A. 1795. In 1793 he was ordained a deacon in the Church of England, and in 1794 priest.

Early in 1795, Mendham accepted the curacy of Sutton Coldfield, Warwickshire. His sole preferment seems to have been the incumbency of Hill Chapel in Arden, Warwickshire, to which he was licensed on 22 August 1836. In this district of Warwickshire the rest of his life was spent, and he died at Sutton Coldfield on 1 November 1856, aged 87.

== Works ==
Mendham studied the points of controversy between Catholicism and its Protestant opponents. He wrote:

- ‘An Exposition of the Lord's Prayer,’ 1803.
- ‘Clavis Apostolica, or a Key to the Apostolic Writings,’ 1821. This originally appeared in the Christian Observer for 1807.
- ‘Episcopal Oath of Allegiance to the Pope.’ By Catholicus [1822].
- ‘Taxatio Papalis, being an Account of the Tax-books of Rome.’ By Emancipatus, 1825; 2nd edit., as ‘Spiritual Venality of Rome,’ 1836. Preface signed Joseph Mendham.
- ‘Account of Indexes, Prohibitory and Expurgatory, of the Church of Rome,’ 1826; 2nd edit., as ‘Literary Policy of the Church of Rome exhibited,’ 1830; Supplement, 1836; Additional Supplement, 1843; whole work, 1844.
- ‘Some Account of Discussion on Infallibility at Cherry Street Chapel, Birmingham, 30 Sept. and 1 Oct. 1830.’ By a Plain Man, 1830.
- Watson's ‘Important Considerations,’ 1601; edited, with preface and notes, by Rev. J. Mendham, 1831.
- ‘Life and Pontificate of Saint Pius the Fifth,’ 1832; 2nd ed., with Supplement, 1844.
- ‘On the Proposed Papal Cathedral in Birmingham; three Letters between Catholicus Protestans [Mendham] and a Birmingham Catholic,’ 1834.
- ‘Address to Inhabitants of Sutton Coldfield on Introduction of Popery into that Parish,’ 1834.
- ‘Memoirs of Council of Trent,’ 1834; Supplement thereto, 1836.
- ‘Index Librorum Prohibitorum a Sixto V Papa,’ 1835.
- ‘The spiritual venality of Rome : Taxe sacre penitentiarie apostolice; preceded by a historical and critical account of the taxae cancellariae apostolicae and taxae sacrae poenitentiariae apostolicae of the United Church and Court of modern Rome,‘ 1836
- ‘Venal Indulgences and Pardons of the Church of Rome,’ 1839 (a correction of an error in this volume is given in Hist. MSS. Comm. 12th Rep. App. ix. p. 165).
- ‘Index of Prohibited Books by command of the present Pope Gregory XVI,’ 1840.
- ‘Remarks on some parts of the Rev. T. L. Green's Second Letter to Archdeacon Hodson,’ 1840.
- ‘Modern Evasions of Christianity,’ 1840.
- ‘Services of Church of England vindicated against certain Popular Objections,’ 1841.
- ‘Cardinal Allen's Admonition,’ 1588; reprinted, with a preface, by Eupator, 1812.
- ‘Acta Concilii Tridentini … a Gabriele Cardinale Paleotto descripta,’ edited by J. Mendham, 1842. Minutes to the Council of Trent by Gabriele Paleotto.
- ‘Additions to three Minor Works: I. “Spiritual Venality;” II. “Venal Indulgences;” III. “Index by Pope Gregory,”’ 1848.
- ‘Declaration of the Fathers of the Councell of Trent’ [on attendance at heretical services], edited by Eupator, 1850.

He contributed to Notes and Queries, the Protestant Journal, and Christian Observer. Articles by him in the Church of England Quarterly Review were printed separately.

Mendham collected a library of controversial theology. This came to his nephew, the Rev. John Mendham, on whose death his widow, Sophia, placed the books at the disposal of Charles Hastings Collette, solicitor in Lincoln's Inn Fields, by whom a selection was made and presented to the Incorporated Law Society in Chancery Lane, London. These are described in a printed catalogue dated 1871, and in a supplement which was issued in 1874. It contained many sermons and pamphlets by him. This Mendham Collection has since 1985 been on loan to Canterbury Cathedral Library and the University of Kent. In July 2012 the Law Society removed some of the most valuable books with the intention of selling them to raise funds. An auction sale took place at Sotheby's in London on 5 June 2013, when 106 out of the total of 142 lots were sold at a total price of £1,180,875. The Revd. Joseph Mendham bequeathed manuscripts concerned with the Council of Trent to the Bodleian Library.

== Family ==
On 15 December 1795 he married Maria, second daughter of the Rev. John Riland, rector of Sutton Coldfield (died 1822), by his wife Ann, daughter of Thomas Hudson of Huddersfield. His wife, who was born in 1772, died in 1841. Their only son, the Rev. Robert Riland Mendham, matriculated at Wadham College, Oxford, 12 November 1816, aged 18, took the degrees of B.A. 1820, M.A. 1824, and died at Sutton Coldfield 15 June 1857. Their daughter, Ann Maria Mendham, died 1872. Both were unmarried.

== Sources ==
- Hingley, Sheila; Shaw, David, eds. (1994), Catalogue of the Law Society's Mendham Collection, lent to the University of Kent at Canterbury and housed in Canterbury Cathedral Library; compiled & edited from the catalogue of Helen Carron and others, London: The Law Society, cliv, 500 pp.

== Notes ==
=== Attribution ===
This article incorporates text from a publication now in the public domain: Courtney, William Prideaux (1894). "Mendham, Joseph". In Lee, Sidney (ed.). Dictionary of National Biography. Vol. 37. London: Smith, Elder & Co.
