= Cryptoconchoidsyphonostomata =

One-act play staged in 1875

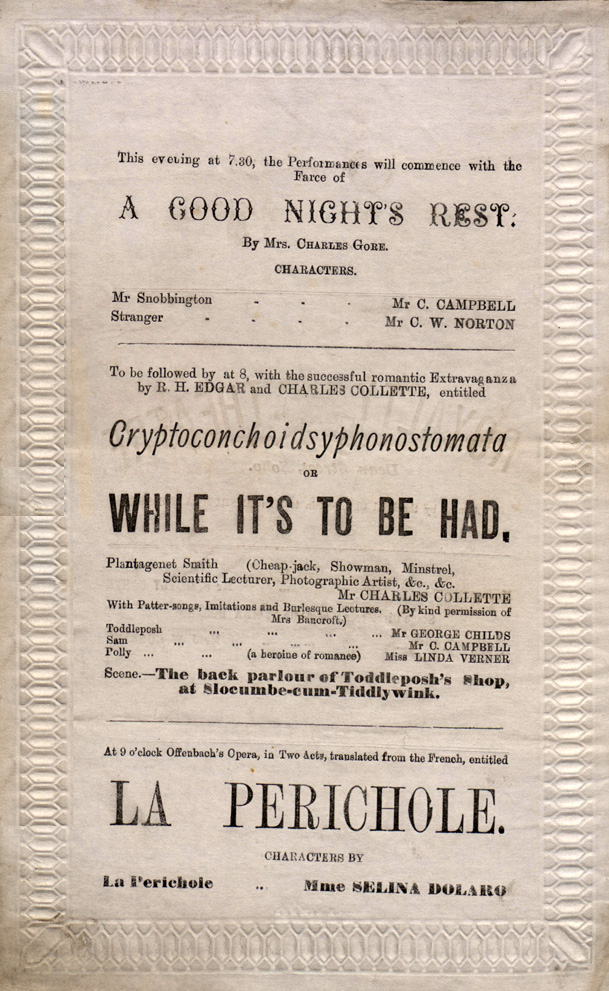
Royalty Theatre programme, March 1875, with Cryptoconchoidsyphonostomata on the bill

Cryptoconchoidsyphonostomata, or While it's to be Had was a one-act play styled a "successful romantic Extravaganza", written by R. H. Edgar and Charles Collette, an actor who also starred in the leading role of Plantagenet Smith and wrote the words and music of the play's hit song. It is chiefly remembered today as the curtain-raiser at the Royalty Theatre on the night of 25 March 1875, the night of the premiere of Gilbert and Sullivan's first opera produced by Richard D'Oyly Carte, Trial by Jury.

== Background ==
Cryptoconchoidsyphonostomata had been tried out in matinées at the Vaudeville Theatre and had premiered on 18 January 1875 at the Holborn Theatre "on the occasion of an amateur performance for the benefit of a charity."

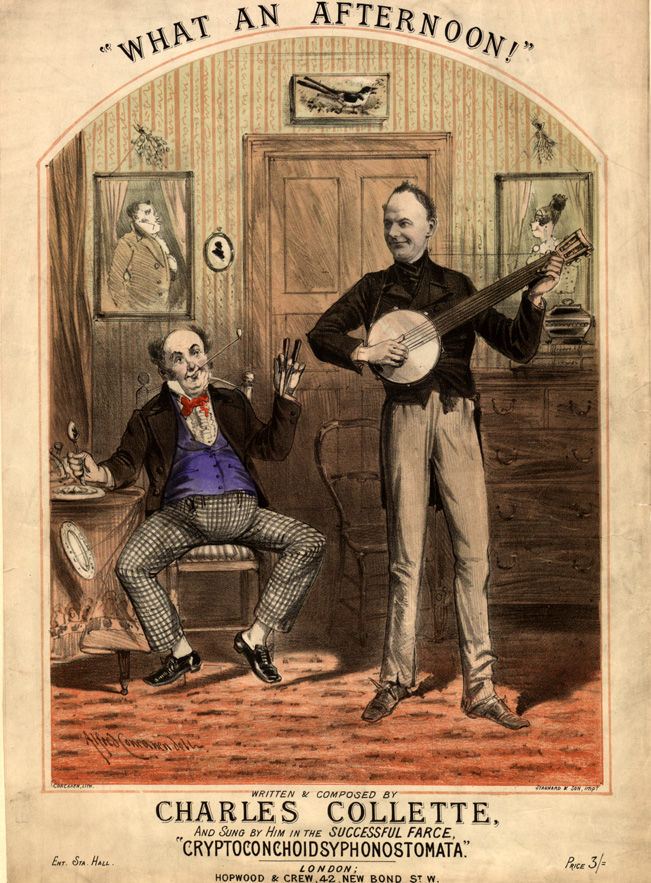
Sheet music for Collette's popular song from Cryptoconchoidsyphonostomata

It opened at the Royalty Theatre on 27 February 1875 as a companion piece to Offenbach's La Périchole. Linda Verner, who played the First Bridesmaid, and later the Plaintiff, in Trial by Jury, played Polly in Cryptoconchoidsyphonostomata.

Collette's song from the play, "What an Afternoon!", was published separately. The simple form of the lyric, with its title repeated every other line, caught the public fancy:

His trousers' sleeves were bright green-red,
What an afternoon!
With velvet collar of white black lead;
What an afternoon!
He also moved his legs when he walked,
What an afternoon!
And he generally spoke when he usually talked;
What an afternoon!

The success of the song prompted unauthorized distribution of the words and music. Collette successfully sued a man named Goode, causing one paper to comment that the song should be retitled "What a Goode Afternoon".

Cryptoconchoidsyphonostomata was replaced at the Royalty, after 25 March 1875, by other works for the remainder of the run of Trial. Nevertheless, it was popular and was repeated elsewhere, including at the Olympic Theatre on 10 July 1875, starring Collette. In 1881, it was presented at the Imperial Theatre. Colette appeared in nearly 20 productions of the play between 1875 and 1881, revising the script over the years.

== Synopsis and reception ==
The Morning Post printed the following review and synopsis:

Cryptoconchoidsyphonostomata, as Mr. Collette calls the whimsicality he has, with the aid of Mr. R. H. Edgar, invented for the display of his own powers, though it brings upon the stage four characters is in fact little more than a monologue. A street genius named Plantagenet Smith, whose versatile talents have not been enough to keep his head above water, has seen and loved Polly Toddleposh, the lovely and romantic daughter of a successful tradesman. His passion is returned, and he has ventured, strong in his impudence, into the presence of the worthy cit to coax, bully, or cajole him into a consent to his marriage. A prospect more uninviting than that of a son-in-law of this species, dirty, dingy and wholly disreputable, cannot easily be put before a father. Some delay is accordingly experienced before the consent of Mr. Toddleposh is wrung from him. To show how useful he can make himself, our Celadon displays before the astounded father the whole range of his accomplishments. Now he gives, with the accompaniment of a banjo, such as contributed to form the reputation of Mr. Charles Mathews, and, being encored, substitutes for it a piece of rhymed and rhythmical nonsense wholly indescribable; now he gives in breathless haste a conjunction of all the hardest and most crabbed specimens of scientific terminology, and again he imitates the wheedling jargon of the street swindler. So varied accomplishments soften the paternal heart, and, after half an hour's very clever, if wholly preposterous, amusement has been afforded, Mr. Toddleposh relents and promises the indefatigable lover an occupation and a wife. If the former can scarcely be pronounced worthy of his talents, the latter, as presented by Miss Linda Verner, is wholly in excess of his deserts. A balance may accordingly be struck.
