= Trial by Jury =

1875 comic opera by Gilbert & Sullivan

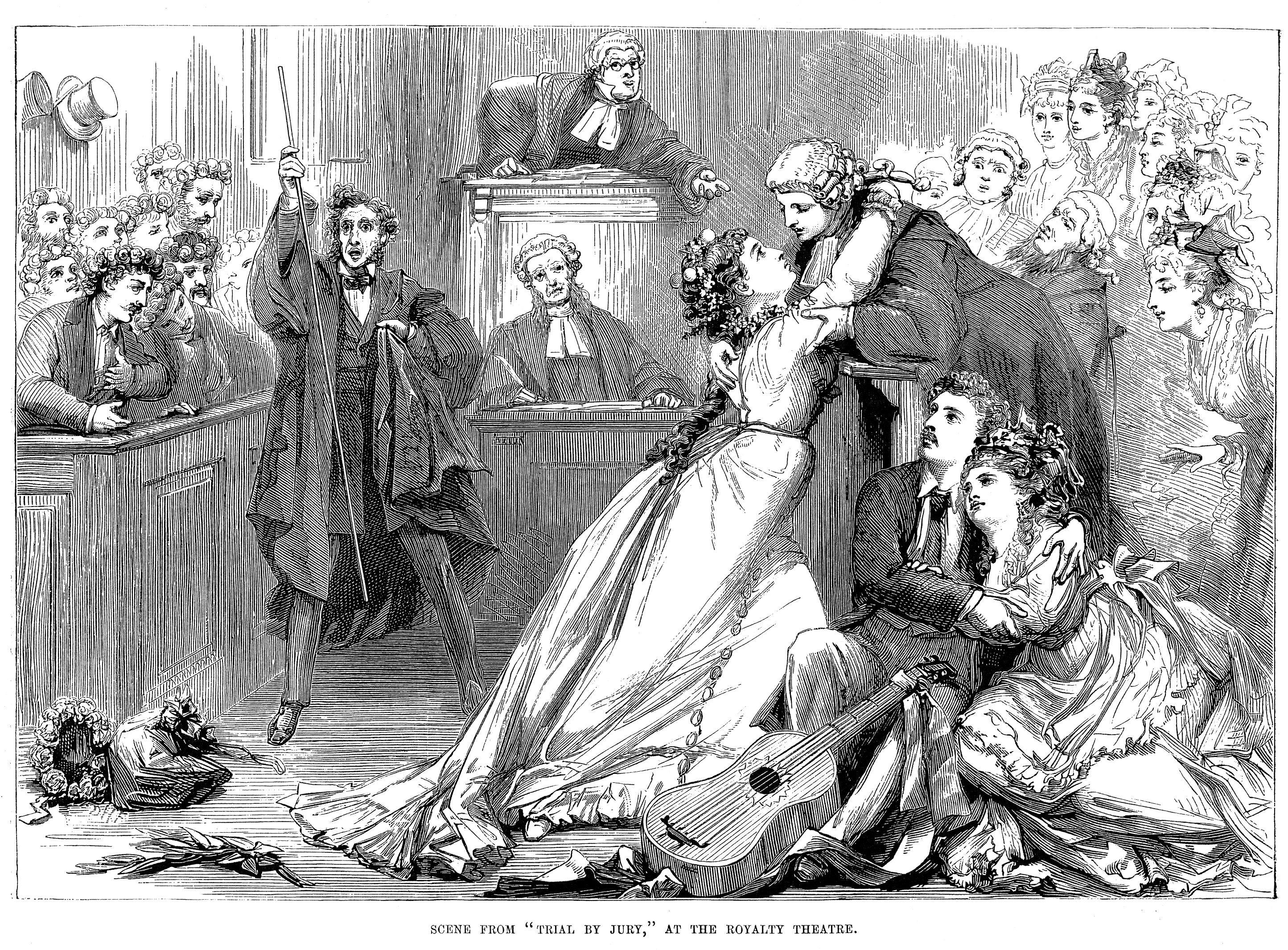
A scene from Trial by Jury as illustrated in the magazine Illustrated Sporting and Dramatic News of 1 May 1875

Trial by Jury is a comic opera in one act, with music by Arthur Sullivan and libretto by W. S. Gilbert. It was first produced on 25 March 1875, at London's Royalty Theatre, where it initially ran for 131 performances and was considered a hit, receiving critical praise and outrunning its popular companion piece, Jacques Offenbach's La Périchole. The story concerns a "breach of promise of marriage" lawsuit in which the judge and legal system are the objects of lighthearted satire. Gilbert based the libretto of Trial by Jury on an operetta parody that he had written in 1868.

The opera premiered more than three years after Gilbert and Sullivan's only previous collaboration, Thespis, an 1871–72 Christmas season entertainment. In the intervening years, both the author and the composer were busy with separate projects. Beginning in 1873, Gilbert tried several times to get the opera produced before the impresario Richard D'Oyly Carte suggested that he collaborate on it with Sullivan. Sullivan was pleased with the piece and promptly wrote the music.

As with most Gilbert and Sullivan operas, the plot of Trial by Jury is ludicrous, but the characters behave as if the events were perfectly reasonable. This narrative technique blunts some of the pointed barbs aimed at hypocrisy, especially of those in authority, and the sometimes base motives of supposedly respectable people and institutions. These themes became favourites of Gilbert through the rest of his collaborations with Sullivan. Critics and audiences praised how well Sullivan's witty and good-humoured music complemented Gilbert's satire. The success of Trial by Jury launched the famous series of 13 collaborative works between Gilbert and Sullivan that came to be known as the Savoy Operas.

After its original production in 1875, Trial by Jury toured widely in Britain and elsewhere and was frequently revived and recorded. It also became popular for benefit performances. The work continues to be frequently played, especially as a companion piece to other short Gilbert and Sullivan operas or other works. According to the theatre scholar Kurt Gänzl, it is "probably the most successful British one-act operetta of all time".

== Background ==
Before Trial by Jury, W. S. Gilbert and Arthur Sullivan had collaborated on one previous opera, Thespis; or, The Gods Grown Old, in 1871. Although reasonably successful, it was a Christmas entertainment, and such works were not expected to endure. Between Thespis and Trial by Jury, Gilbert and Sullivan did not collaborate on any further operas, and each man separately produced works that further built his reputation in his own field. Gilbert wrote several short stories, edited the second volume of his comic Bab Ballads, and created a dozen theatrical works, including Happy Arcadia in 1872; The Wicked World, The Happy Land and The Realm of Joy in 1873; Charity, Topsyturveydom and Sweethearts in 1874. At the same time, Sullivan wrote various pieces of religious music, including the Festival Te Deum (1872) and an oratorio, The Light of the World (1873), and edited Church Hymns, with Tunes (1874), which included 45 of his own hymns and arrangements. Two of his most famous hymn tunes from this period are settings of "Onward, Christian Soldiers" and "Nearer, my God, to Thee" (both in 1872). He also wrote a suite of incidental music to The Merry Wives of Windsor (1874) and many parlour ballads and other songs, including three in 1874–75 with words by Gilbert: "The Distant Shore", "Sweethearts" (inspired by Gilbert's play) and "The Love that Loves Me Not".

=== Genesis of the opera ===
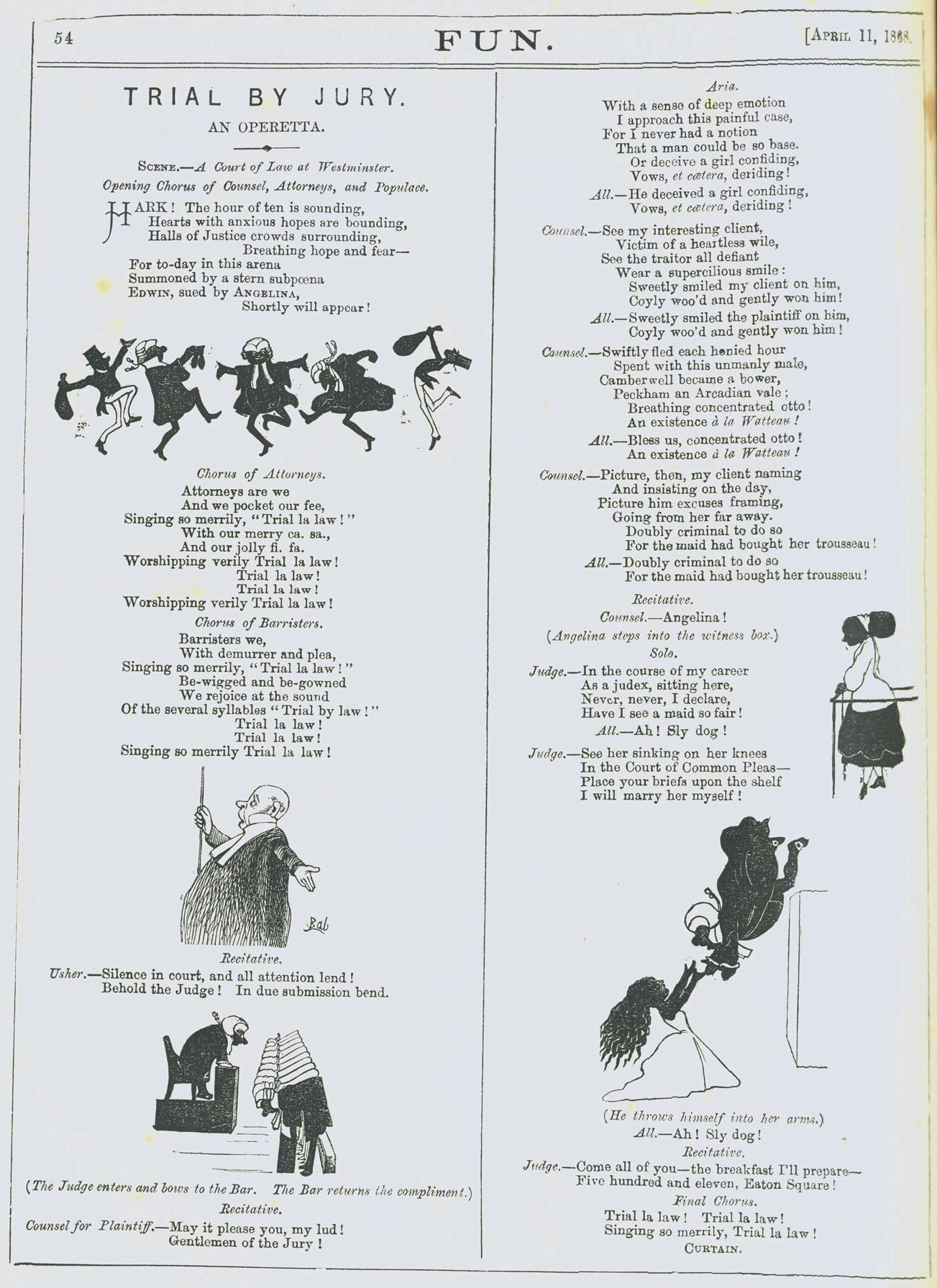
Gilbert's original sketch of Trial by Jury, published in Fun in 1868

The genesis of Trial by Jury was in 1868, when Gilbert wrote a single-page illustrated comic piece for the magazine Fun entitled Trial by Jury: An Operetta. Drawing on Gilbert's training and brief practice as a barrister, it detailed a "breach of promise" trial going awry, in the process spoofing the law, lawyers and the legal system. (In the Victorian era, a man could be required to pay compensation should he fail to marry a woman to whom he was engaged.) The outline of this story was followed in the later opera, and two of its numbers appeared in nearly their final form in Fun. The skit, however, ended abruptly: the moment the attractive plaintiff stepped into the witness box, the judge leapt into her arms and vowed to marry her, whereas in the opera, the case is allowed to proceed further before this conclusion is reached.

In 1873, the opera manager and composer Carl Rosa asked Gilbert for a piece to use as part of a season of English opera that Rosa planned to present at the Drury Lane Theatre; Rosa was to write or commission the music. Gilbert expanded Trial into a one-act libretto. Rosa's wife, Euphrosyne Parepa-Rosa, a childhood friend of Gilbert's, died after an illness in 1874, and Rosa dropped the project. Later in the same year, Gilbert offered the libretto to the impresario Richard D'Oyly Carte, but Carte knew of no composer available to set it to music.

Meanwhile, Sullivan may have been considering a return to light opera: Cox and Box, his first comic opera, had received a London revival (co-starring his brother, Fred Sullivan) in September 1874. In November, Sullivan travelled to Paris and contacted Albert Millaud, one of the librettists for Jacques Offenbach's operettas. However, he returned to London empty-handed and worked on incidental music for the Gaiety Theatre's production of The Merry Wives of Windsor. By early 1875, Carte was managing Selina Dolaro's Royalty Theatre, and he needed a short opera to be played as an afterpiece to Offenbach's La Périchole, which was to open on 30 January (with Fred Sullivan in the cast), in which Dolaro starred. Carte had asked Sullivan to compose something for the theatre and advertised in The Times in late January: "In Preparation, a New Comic Opera composed expressly for this theatre by Mr. Arthur Sullivan in which Madame Dolaro and Nellie Bromley will appear." (Note: Apparently, this refers to another opera that Sullivan was working on for the Royalty: an advertisement in The Era on 14 March 1875 stated that "In consequence of the continued success of La Périchole, the production of Mr. Sullivan's two-act opera is postponed". A gossip column in the Athenæum, dated 13 March 1875, stated that Sullivan was working on new music for a piece at the St James's Theatre. From this, McElroy speculates that Sullivan had already begun writing musical numbers for The Zoo before he shifted his energies to Trial by Jury and decided "to salvage them by telling [his librettist] to boil the libretto down to one act and [transfer] the project to another theatre.") But around the same time, Carte also remembered Gilbert's Trial by Jury and knew that Gilbert had worked with Sullivan to create Thespis. He suggested to Gilbert that Sullivan was the man to write the music for Trial.

Gilbert finally called on Sullivan and read the libretto to him on 20 February 1875. Sullivan was enthusiastic, later recalling, "[Gilbert] read it through ... in the manner of a man considerably disappointed with what he had written. As soon as he had come to the last word, he closed up the manuscript violently, apparently unconscious of the fact that he had achieved his purpose so far as I was concerned, inasmuch as I was screaming with laughter the whole time." Trial by Jury, described as "A Novel and Original Dramatic Cantata" in the original promotional material, (Note: See First edition libretto cover on exhibition at the University of Rochester Libraries. In 1871 Sullivan had composed his only other "dramatic cantata", On Shore and Sea.) was composed and rehearsed in a matter of weeks.

=== Production and aftermath ===
The result of Gilbert and Sullivan's collaboration was a witty, tuneful and very "English" piece, in contrast to the bawdy burlesques and adaptations of French operettas that dominated the London musical stage at that time.

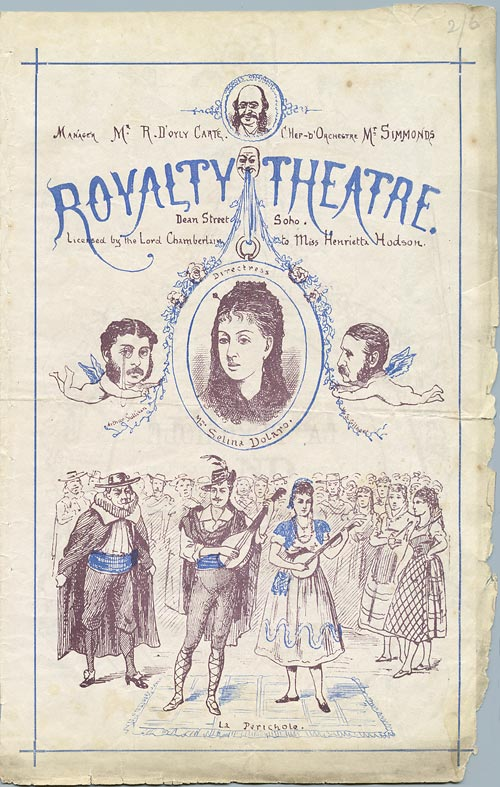
April 1875 programme for La Périchole and Trial by Jury. Sullivan and Gilbert are the cherubs.

Initially, Trial by Jury, which runs only 30 minutes or so, was played last on a triple bill, on which the main attraction, La Périchole (starring Dolaro as the title character, Fred Sullivan as Don Andres and Walter H. Fisher as Piquillo), was preceded by the one-act farce Cryptoconchoidsyphonostomata. The latter was immediately replaced by a series of other curtain raisers. (Note: The fashion in the late Victorian era was to present long evenings in the theatre, and so Carte preceded his Savoy operas with curtain raisers.) The composer conducted the first night's performance, and the theatre's music director, B. Simmons, conducted thereafter. The composer's brother, Fred Sullivan, starred as the Learned Judge, with Nellie Bromley as the Plaintiff. One of the choristers in Trial by Jury, W. S. Penley, was promoted in November 1875 to the small part of the Foreman of the Jury and made a strong impact on audiences with his amusing facial expressions and gestures. In March 1876, he temporarily replaced Fred Sullivan as the Judge, when Fred's health declined from tuberculosis. With this start, Penley went on to a successful career as comic actor, culminating with the lead role in the record-breaking original production of Charley's Aunt. Fred Sullivan died in January 1877.

Jacques Offenbach's works were then at the height of their popularity in Britain, but Trial by Jury proved even more popular than La Périchole, becoming an unexpected hit. Trial by Jury drew crowds and continued to run after La Périchole closed. While the Royalty Theatre closed for the summer in 1875, Dolaro immediately took Trial on tour in England and Ireland. The piece resumed at the Royalty later in 1875 and was revived for additional London seasons in 1876 at the Opera Comique and in 1877 at the Strand Theatre.

Trial by Jury soon became the most desirable supporting piece for any London production, and, outside London, the major British theatrical touring companies had added it to their repertoire by about 1877. The original production was given a world tour by the Opera Comique's assistant manager Emily Soldene, which travelled as far as Australia. Unauthorised "pirate" productions quickly sprang up in America, taking advantage of the fact that American courts did not enforce foreign copyrights. It also became popular as part of the Victorian tradition of "benefit concerts", where the theatrical community came together to raise money for actors and actresses down on their luck or retiring. The D'Oyly Carte Opera Company continued to play the work for a century, licensing the piece to amateur and foreign professional companies, such as the J. C. Williamson Gilbert and Sullivan Opera Company. Since the copyrights to Gilbert and Sullivan works ran out in 1961, the piece has been available to theatre companies around the world free of royalties. The work's enduring popularity since 1875 makes it, according to theatrical scholar Kurt Gänzl, "probably the most successful British one-act operetta of all time".

The success of Trial by Jury spurred several attempts to reunite Gilbert and Sullivan, but difficulties arose. Plans for a collaboration for Carl Rosa in 1875 fell through because Gilbert was too busy with other projects, and an attempted Christmas 1875 revival of Thespis by Richard D'Oyly Carte failed when the financiers backed out. Gilbert and Sullivan continued their separate careers, though both continued writing light opera, among other projects: Sullivan's next light opera, The Zoo, opened while Trial by Jury was still playing, in June 1875; and Gilbert's Eyes and No Eyes premiered a month later, followed by Princess Toto in 1876.

Gilbert and Sullivan were not reunited until The Sorcerer in 1877. It was announced that Fred Sullivan would be involved with the next Gilbert and Sullivan opera the following season, but he became ill and died soon afterwards.

== Roles ==
- The Learned Judge (comic baritone)
- The Plaintiff (soprano)
- The Defendant (tenor)
- Counsel for the Plaintiff (lyric baritone)
- Usher (bass-baritone)
- Foreman of the Jury (bass)
- Associate (silent)
- First Bridesmaid
- Chorus of Bridesmaids, Gentlemen of the Jury, Barristers, Attorneys and Public.

== Synopsis ==
Excerpt from "The Judge's Song"

JUDGE.
When I, good friends, was called to the bar,
I'd an appetite fresh and hearty.
But I was, as many young barristers are,
An impecunious party.
I'd a swallow-tail coat of a beautiful blue –
A brief which I bought of a booby –
A couple of shirts, and a collar or two,
And a ring that looked like a ruby!

CHORUS.
He'd a couple of shirts, and a collar or two,
And a ring that looked like a ruby.

JUDGE.
In Westminster Hall I danced a dance,
Like a semi-despondent fury;
For I thought I never should hit on a chance
Of addressing a British Jury –
But I soon got tired of third-class journeys,
And dinners of bread and water;
So I fell in love with a rich attorney's
Elderly, ugly daughter.

CHORUS.
So he fell in love, etc.

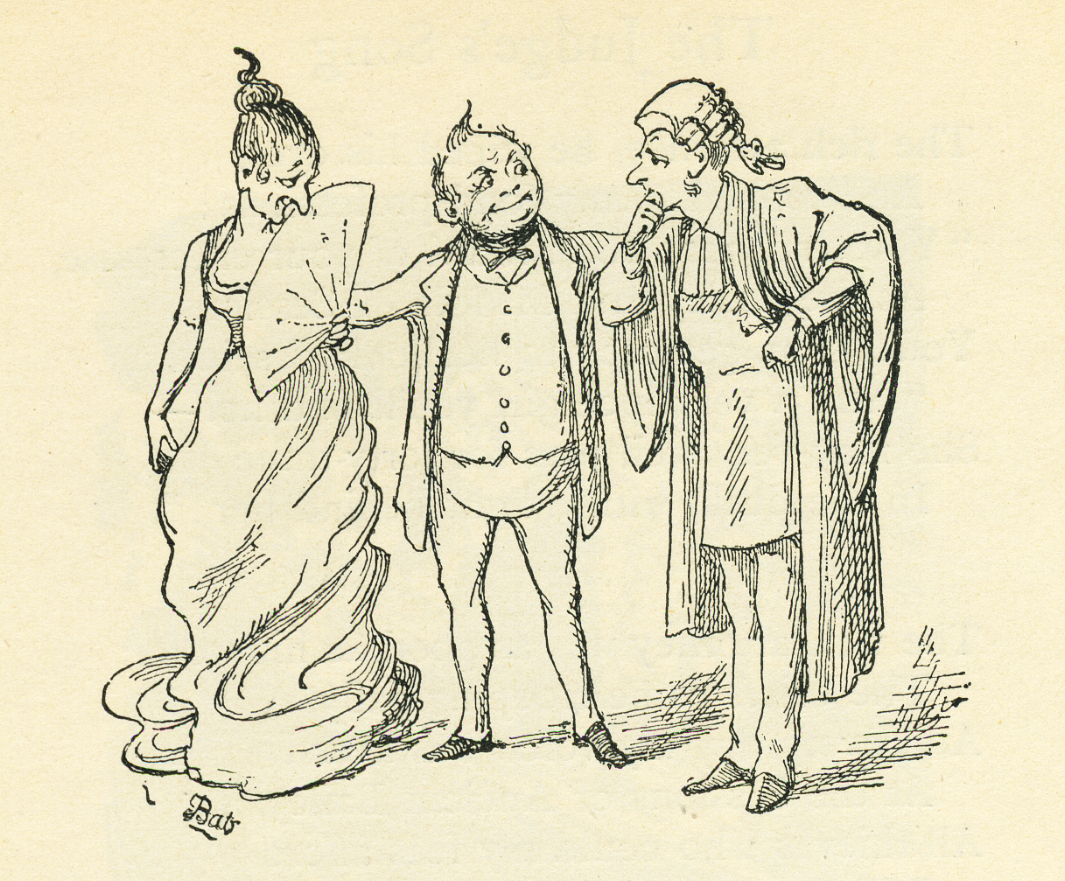
Drawing by W. S. Gilbert

Drawing by W. S. Gilbert

It is 10 a.m. at the Court of the Exchequer, where a jury and the public assemble to hear a case of breach of promise of marriage.

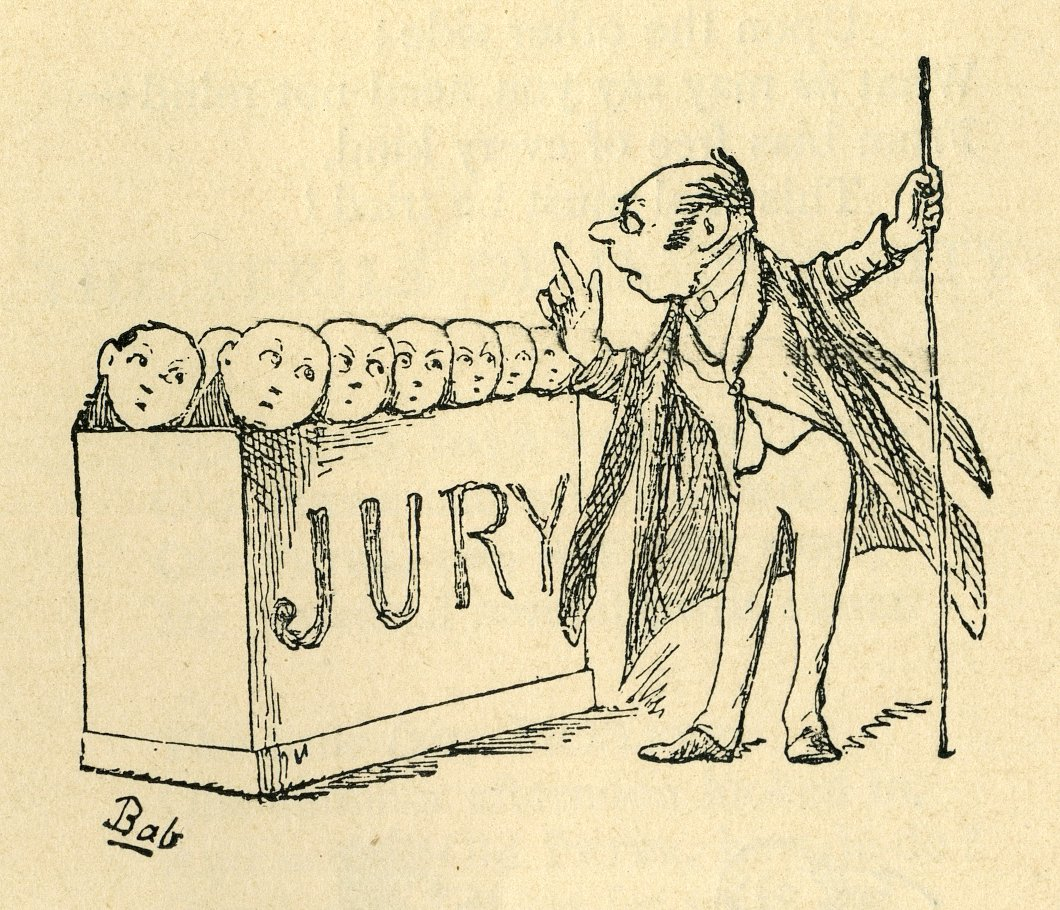
The Usher advises the jury. Drawing by W. S. Gilbert

The Usher advises the jury to listen to the broken-hearted Plaintiff's case, adding that they "needn't mind" what the "ruffianly defendant" has to say. He notes, for the record, that "From bias free of every kind, this trial must be tried!" The Defendant (Edwin) (Note: Edwin and Angelina were "a traditional pairing of names of faithful lovers" as far back in English literature as Oliver Goldsmith's The Hermit and The Vicar of Wakefield.) arrives, and the jurymen greet him with hostility, even though, as he points out, they have as yet no idea of the merits of his case. He candidly tells them that he jilted the Plaintiff because she became a "bore intense" to him, and he then quickly took up with another woman. The jurymen recall their own wayward youth, but as they are now respectable gentlemen they have no sympathy for the Defendant.

The Judge enters with great pomp and describes how he rose to his position – by courting a rich attorney's "elderly, ugly daughter". The rich attorney then aided his prospective son-in-law's legal career until the Judge "became as rich as the Gurneys" and "threw over" the daughter. The jury and public are delighted with the Judge, although he has just admitted to the same wrong of which the Defendant is accused. (Note: Burgess comments, "The irony of the situation will not go unperceived by the reader.")

The jury is sworn in, and the Plaintiff (Angelina) is summoned. She is preceded into the courtroom by her bridesmaids, one of whom catches the eye of the Judge. However, when Angelina herself arrives in full wedding dress, she instantly captures the heart of both Judge and jury. The Counsel for the Plaintiff makes a moving speech detailing Edwin's betrayal. Angelina feigns distress and staggers, first into the arms of the Foreman of the Jury, and then of the Judge. Edwin counters, explaining that his change of heart is only natural:

Oh, gentlemen, listen, I pray,
Though I own that my heart has been ranging,
Of nature the laws I obey,
For nature is constantly changing.
The moon in her phases is found,
The time and the wind and the weather,
The months in succession come round,
And you don't find two Mondays together.

He offers to marry both the Plaintiff and his new love, if that would satisfy everyone. The Judge at first finds this "a reasonable proposition", but the Counsel argues that from the days of James II, it has been "a rather serious crime / To marry two wives at a time"; he labels the crime not "bigamy", but rather "burglary". Perplexed, everyone in court ponders the "nice dilemma" in a parody of Italian opera ensembles.

Angelina desperately embraces Edwin, demonstrating the depth of her love, and bemoans her loss – all in evidence of the large amount of damages that the jury should require Edwin to pay. Edwin, in turn, says he is a smoker, a drunkard, and a bully (when tipsy), and that the Plaintiff could not have endured him even for a day; thus the damages should be small. The Judge suggests making Edwin tipsy to see if he would really "thrash and kick" Angelina, but everyone else (except Edwin) objects to this experiment. Impatient at the lack of progress, the Judge resolves the case by offering to marry Angelina himself. This is found quite satisfactory and the proceedings are concluded with "joy unbounded". (Note: This synopsis is based on the libretto as printed in Bradley, pp. 7–39)

== Musical numbers ==
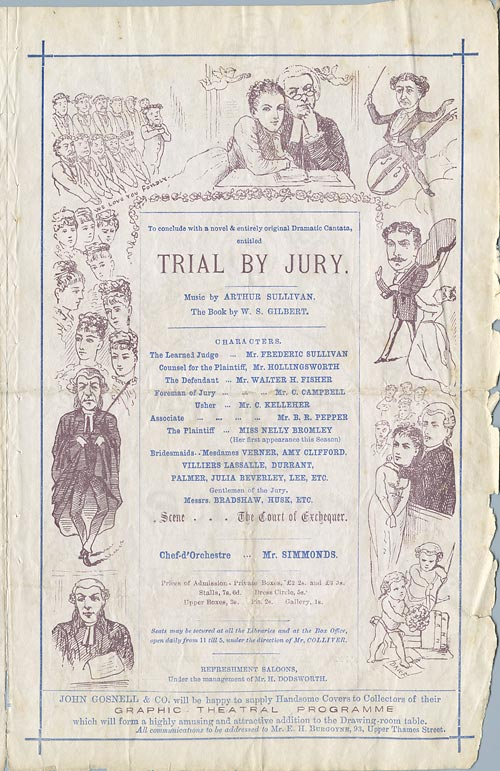
Third page of the 1875 programme

- 1. "Hark, the hour of ten is sounding" (Chorus) and "Now, Jurymen, hear my advice" (Usher)
- 1a. "Is this the Court of the Exchequer?" (Defendant)
- 2. "When first my old, old love I knew" (Defendant and Chorus) and "Silence in Court!" (Usher)
- 3. "All hail great Judge!" (Chorus and Judge)
- 4. "When I, good friends, was call'd to the Bar" (Judge and Chorus)
- 5. "Swear thou the Jury" (Counsel, Usher) and "Oh will you swear by yonder skies" (Usher and Chorus)
- 6. "Where is the Plaintiff?" (Counsel, Usher) and "Comes the broken flower" (Chorus of Bridesmaids and Plaintiff) (Note: "Where is the Plaintiff?" has a joke involving echoes of the Usher's "Oh, Angelina", echoing in the courtroom. In D'Oyly Carte productions, the echoes were performed by the defendant with his back to the audience.)
- 7. "Oh, never, never, never, since I joined the human race" (Judge, Foreman, Chorus)
- 8. "May it please you, my lud!" (Counsel for Plaintiff and Chorus)
- 9. "That she is reeling is plain to see!" (Judge, Foreman, Plaintiff, Counsel, and Chorus)
- 10. "Oh, gentlemen, listen, I pray" (Defendant and Chorus of Bridesmaids)
- 11. "That seems a reasonable proposition" (Judge, Counsel, and Chorus)
- 12. "A nice dilemma we have here" (Ensemble)
- 13. "I love him, I love him, with fervour unceasing" (Plaintiff, Defendant and Chorus) and "The question, gentlemen, is one of liquor" (Judge and Ensemble)
- 14. "Oh, joy unbounded, with wealth surrounded" (Ensemble)

For clarity, only characters with a major role in each particular song have been listed.

== Reception ==
Reviews of the first performance of Trial by Jury were uniformly glowing. Fun magazine declared the opera "extremely funny and admirably composed", while the rival Punch magazine wrote that it "is the funniest bit of nonsense your representative has seen for a considerable time", only regretting that it was too short. The Daily News praised the author: "In whimsical invention and eccentric humour Mr. W. S. Gilbert has no living rival among our dramatic writers, and never has his peculiar vein of drollery and satire been more conspicuous than in a little piece entitled Trial by Jury". The Daily Telegraph concluded that the piece illustrated the composer's "great capacity for dramatic writing of the lighter class". Many critics emphasised the happy combination of Gilbert's words and Sullivan's music. One noted that "so completely is each imbued with the same spirit, that it would be as difficult to conceive the existence of Mr. Gilbert's verses without Mr. Sullivan's music, as of Mr. Sullivan's music without Mr. Gilbert's verses. Each gives each a double charm." Another agreed that "it seems, as in the great Wagnerian operas, as though poem and music had proceeded simultaneously from one and the same brain."

In 1880, Punch magazine prematurely anticipated Sullivan's knighthood, publishing a cartoon accompanied by a parody version of "When I, good friends", from Trial by Jury, that summarised Sullivan's career to that date:
Excerpt from A Humorous Knight
["It is reported that after the Leeds Festival Dr. Sullivan will be knighted." Having read this in a column of gossip, a be-nighted Contributor, who has "the Judge's Song" on the brain, suggests the following verse....]

As a boy I had such a musical bump,
And its size so struck Mr. HELMORE,
That he said, "Though you sing those songs like a trump,
You shall write some yourself that will sell more."
So I packed off to Leipsic, without looking back,
And returned in such classical fury,
That I sat down with HANDEL and HAYDN and BACH,—
And turned out "Trial by Jury."

But W.S.G. he jumped for joy
As he said, "Though the job dismay you,
Send Exeter Hall to the deuce, my boy;
It's the haul with me that'll pay you."
And we hauled so well, mid jeers and taunts,
That we've settled, spite all temptations,
To stick to our Sisters and our Cousins and our Aunts,—
And continue our pleasant relations.

The opening night audience was also delighted by the piece, preferring it even to the Offenbach work: "To judge by the unceasing and almost boisterous hilarity which formed a sort of running commentary on the part of the audience, Trial by Jury suffered nothing whatever from so dangerous a juxtaposition [with a piece by the popular Offenbach]. On the contrary, it may fairly be said to have borne away the palm." A reviewer noted that "Laughter more frequent or more hearty was never heard in any theatre than that which more than once brought the action ... to a temporary standstill." Another paper summed up its popular appeal: "Trial by Jury is but a trifle – it pretends to be nothing more – but it is one of those merry bits of extravagance which a great many will go to see and hear, which they will laugh at, and which they will advise their friends to go and see, and therefore its success cannot be doubtful."

Among the actors, special critical praise was reserved for the composer's brother, Fred Sullivan, in the role of the Learned Judge: "The greatest 'hit' was made by Mr. F. Sullivan, whose blending of official dignity, condescension, and, at the right moment, extravagant humour, made the character of the Judge stand out with all requisite prominence, and added much to the interest of the piece." The Times concurred that his portrayal deserved "a special word of praise for its quiet and natural humour." Nelly Bromley (the Plaintiff), Walter H. Fisher (the Defendant), John Hollingsworth (the Counsel) and others were also praised for their acting.

Later assessments of the work have been no less positive. In 1907, Gilbert's first biographer, Edith A. Browne, concluded: "In Trial by Jury we find author and composer looking at the humorous side of life from exactly the same point of view, and we at once realise how Gilbert and Sullivan have been able to do for Comic Opera what Wagner has done for Grand Opera by combining words and music so as to make them one." H. M. Walbrook similarly wrote in 1922:

Trial by Jury ... satirizes the procedure in an average breach of promise, and also the insincerity which may sometimes underlie the pose of "respectability." Everything done or sung is ludicrous, and yet beneath it all lies a recognisable substratum of truth. The piece is a riot of laughter. The Judge's ditty, "When first, my friends, I was called to the Bar," [sic] is the best-known comic song in the English language. In none of the operas is the genius of Gilbert as an inventor of "comic business" more daringly and irresistibly exhibited. One can see the piece again and again and discover fresh strokes of comicality. Its place in the Gilbert and Sullivan repertory is as secure as ever; and whatever reforms may be hereafter effected in this particular department of the King's Bench Division, Trial by Jury will probably long continue to be one of the English-speaking world's refreshments.

The Gilbert and Sullivan biographer Michael Ainger, writing in 2002, 127 years after the premiere of the opera, explained its enduring appeal: "Nothing could be more serious than a court of law ... and now the world had been turned upside down. The court of law had become the scene of humor and frivolity; the learned judge had shown himself to be as fickle as the defendant, and the justice system turned out to be flawed by human frailty. And Sullivan had grasped the joke.... From the first chords ... Sullivan's music sets the scene of mock-seriousness and proceeds to dance its way through the whole piece."

== Impact and analysis ==
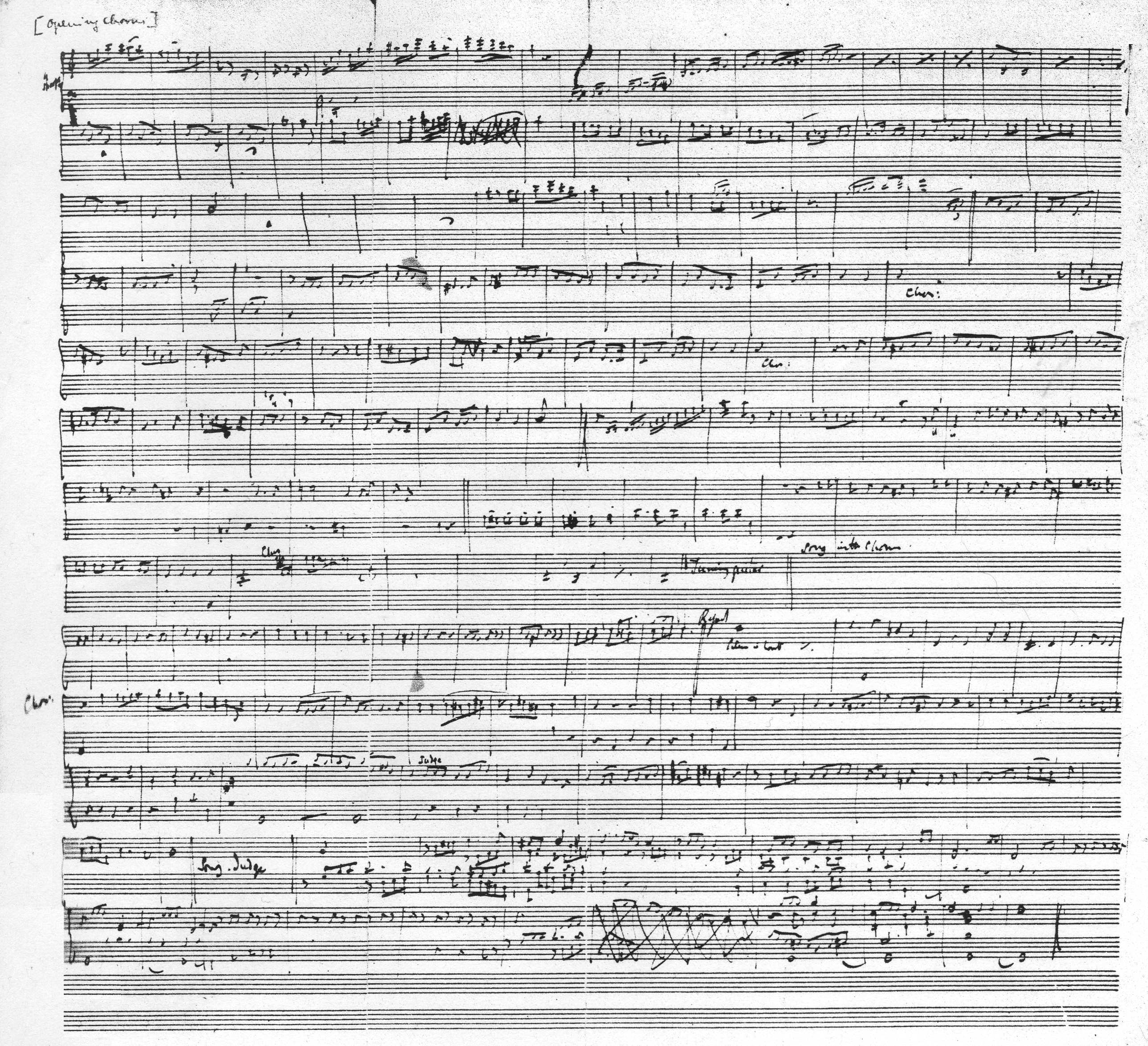
Sullivan's original thematic sketch of Trial by Jury

=== Impact ===
As the first Savoy opera, Trial by Jury marked an important moment in the history of the Gilbert and Sullivan collaboration, as well as in the careers of each of the two men and in Victorian drama in general. The historian Reginald Allen sums up the historical import of the opera:

Most scholars of the Victorian theatre date the birth of Gilbert & Sullivan opera with the first performance of Trial by Jury.... Some will maintain that there is no single date of comparable importance in the history of the modern lyric theatre than this occasion which first brought together the triumvirate of W. S. Gilbert, Arthur Sullivan, and their catalyst business genius, Richard D'Oyly Carte. The next twenty-five years witnessed the spectacular, worldwide success of this collaboration: the Gilbert & Sullivan operas, initiated by Trial by Jury. Without this spark, who can say that any of the instantaneous hits of G[ilbert] & S[ullivan] that followed would ever have been written?

Sidney Dark and Rowland Grey also give a high value to the importance of Trial by Jury and the operas that followed: "There is not a little historical interest in the genesis of the Gilbert and Sullivan operas, the one English contribution of any value to dramatic literature for many generations." In addition, references to the opera continue today in the popular media (Note: For example, in the British television show Kavanagh QC, starring John Thaw, in the episode "Briefs Trooping Gaily", Kavanagh's colleague Jeremy Aldermarten (Nicholas Jones) plays the Judge in an amateur production of Trial by Jury. In another example, in The Follies of 1907, a scene lifted musical excerpts from Trial and featured a send up of the American justice system in which tenor Enrico Caruso was put on trial in a parody of the trial of Harry Kendall Thaw, whose "crime of the century" involved the murder of Stanford White, who was having an affair with his wife, the actress Evelyn Nesbit.) and even in law cases. (Note: For example, in the American lawsuit Askew v. Askew, 22 Cal.App.4th 942 (4th Dist. 1994), the decision includes an extensive reference to Trial by Jury as an introduction to its discussion of suits for breach of promise and "the potential for abuse inherent in such lawsuits".)

=== Pattern for later Savoy operas ===
Trial by Jury is the only Gilbert and Sullivan opera played in one act and the only theatrical work by W. S. Gilbert without spoken dialogue. However, later Gilbert and Sullivan operas retained a number of patterns seen in Trial. For example, all except The Yeomen of the Guard begin with a chorus number. Also, like Trial by Jury, the later operas generally end with a relatively short finale consisting of a chorus number interspersed with short solos by the principal characters. "Comes the broken flower" (part of No. 3) was the first in a string of meditative "Horatian" lyrics, "mingling happiness and sadness, an acceptance and a smiling resignation". These would, from this point forward, allow the characters, in each of the Savoy operas, an introspective scene where they stop and consider life, in contrast to the foolishness of the surrounding scenes. Like both of the tenor's arias in Trial by Jury, tenor arias in later Savoy operas were set in 6/8 time so frequently that Anna Russell, in her 1953 parody, "How to Write Your Own Gilbert and Sullivan Opera", exclaimed, "the tenor ... according to tradition, must sing an aria in 6/8 time, usually accompanying himself on a stringed instrument". In Trial by Jury hypocrisy is revealed as the characters' motivations are held up to satire, and Gilbert mocks the underlying absurdity of the judicial procedures. As Gilbert scholar Andrew Crowther explains, Gilbert combines his criticisms with comic entertainment, which renders them more palatable, while at the same time underlining their truth: "By laughing at a joke you show that you accept its premise." This too would become characteristic of Gilbert's work.

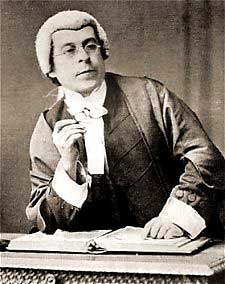
Fred Sullivan as The Learned Judge

The judge's song, "When I, good friends, was called to the Bar" was followed by a string of similar patter songs that would come to epitomise Gilbert and Sullivan's collaboration. In these, often, a "dignified personage [would, just like the Judge,] supply a humorous biography of himself." Just as in Gilbert's earlier play, The Palace of Truth, in these songs, the characters "naïvely reveal their innermost thoughts, unconscious of their egotism, vanity, baseness, or cruelty". Crowther points out that such revelations work particularly well in Trial by Jury, because people commonly expect "characters singing in opera/operetta will communicate at a deeper level of truth than they would in mere speech." In "When I, good friends", the judge outlines the path of corruption that led to his becoming a judge, and this, too, would set the pattern for many of the patter songs in Gilbert and Sullivan operas to follow.

One of Gilbert's most notable innovations, first found in Thespis and repeated in Trial by Jury and all of the later Savoy operas, is the use of the chorus as an essential part of the action. In most earlier operas, burlesques, and comedies, the chorus had very little impact on the plot and served mainly as "noise or ornament". In the Gilbert and Sullivan operas, however, the chorus is essential, taking part in the action and often acting as an important character in its own right. Sullivan recalled, "Until Gilbert took the matter in hand choruses were dummy concerns, and were practically nothing more than a part of the stage setting. It was in 'Thespis' that Gilbert began to carry out his expressed determination to get the chorus to play its proper part in the performance. At this moment it seems difficult to realise that the idea of the chorus being anything more than a sort of stage audience was, at that time, a tremendous novelty." Another Gilbert innovation, following the example of his mentor, T. W. Robertson, was that the costumes and sets were made as realistic as possible: Gilbert based the scenery for the production on the Clerkenwell Sessions House, where he had practised law in the 1860s. The costumes were contemporary, and Angelina and her bridesmaids were dressed in real wedding attire. This attention to detail and careful creation of realistic sets and scenes were typical of Gilbert's stage management and would be repeated in all of Gilbert's work. For instance, when preparing the sets for H.M.S. Pinafore (1878), Gilbert and Sullivan visited Portsmouth to inspect ships. Gilbert made sketches of H.M.S. Victory and H.M.S. St Vincent and created a model set for the carpenters to work from. This was far from standard procedure in Victorian drama, where naturalism was still a relatively new concept, and where most authors had very little influence on how their plays and libretti were staged.

=== Analysis ===
Andrew Crowther places Trial by Jury at the centre of Gilbert's development as a librettist. He notes that in some of Gilbert's early libretti, such as Topsyturveydom (1874), the songs simply emphasise the dialogue. In others, such as Thespis (1871), some songs are relatively disconnected from both the story and characterisation, such as "I once knew a chap" or "Little maid of Arcadee", which simply convey a moral lesson. In Trial by Jury, however, each song carries the plot forward and adds depth to the characters. In addition, unlike some of Gilbert's more fantastical early plots, "Aside from the ending, nothing essentially improbable happens." Gänzl agrees, writing that "Gilbert's libretto was superior to any of his previous efforts. It was concise, modern and satirical without being impossibly whimsical. Having no spoken dialogue it was perforce tightly constructed and allowed of no interpolation or alteration." Sullivan's development as a comic opera writer, too, would mature with Trial by Jury. Except for incidental music for productions of Shakespeare, he had not written any music for the stage since Thespis. Gänzl wrote that Trial by Jury "brought Sullivan firmly and finally into the world of the musical" stage and confirmed, after his previous success with Cox and Box and Thespis, that "Sullivan was a composer of light lyric and comic music who could rival Offenbach, Lecocq and any English musician alive."

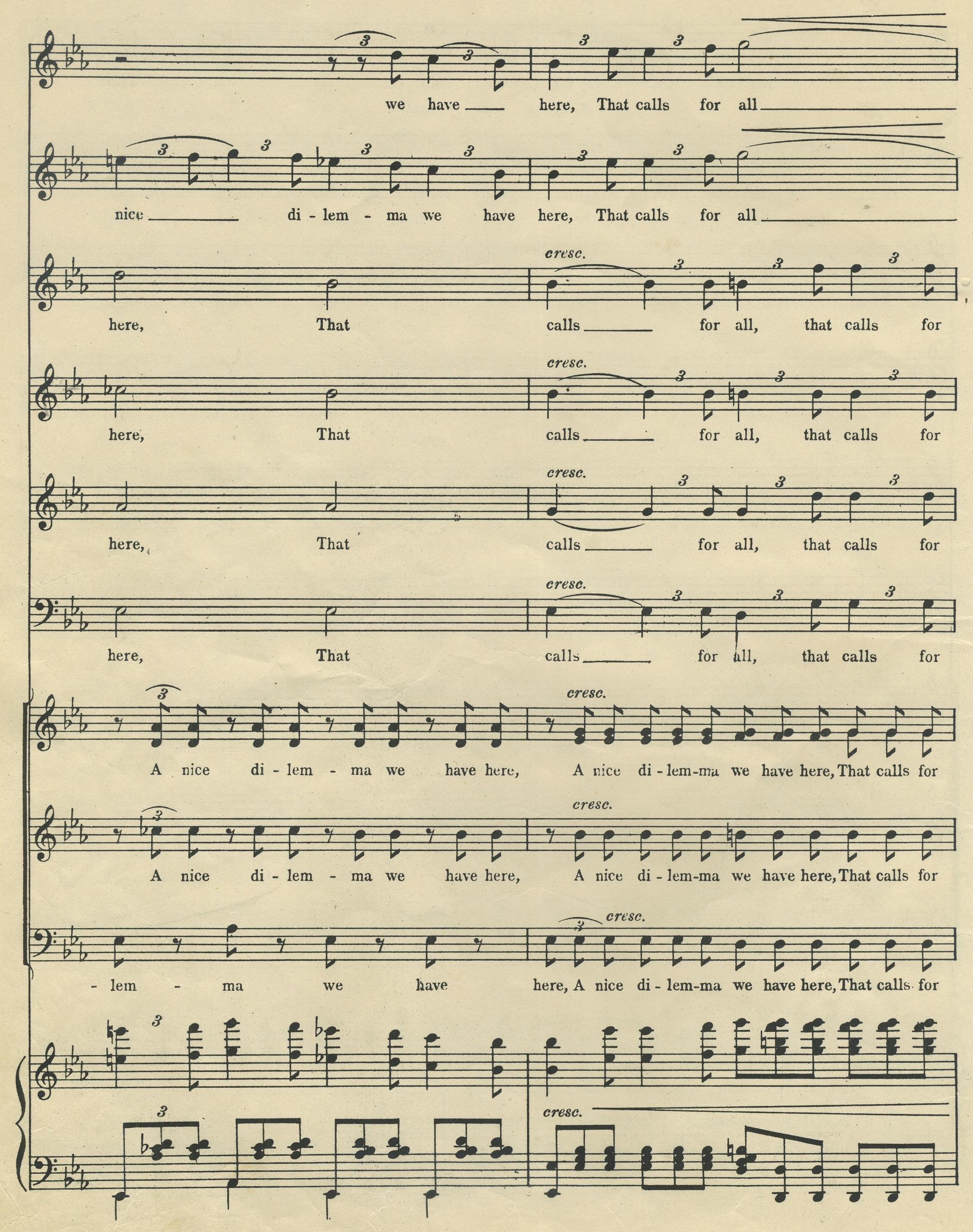
Part of the vocal score of "A nice dilemma"

Sullivan used the opportunities suggested by Gilbert's satire of the pomp and ceremony of the law to provide a variety of musical jokes. "From the first chords ... Sullivan's music sets the scene of mock-seriousness.... His ... humorous use of the orchestra runs throughout". For example, counterpointing the plaintiff's calculated swooning in "That she is reeling is plain to see!" (No. 9) with a reeling, minor-key theme in the string accompaniment, heading up and down the octaves. The instruments are also used to comically set the scene; for instance, he underlines the Counsel's misstatement in the line "To marry two at once is burglaree" with a comic bassoon "sting" in octaves and has the Defendant tune his guitar on stage (simulated by a violin in the orchestra) in the opening to his song.

The score also contains two parodies or pastiches of other composers: No. 3, "All hail great Judge" is an elaborate parody of Handel's fugues, and No. 12, "A nice dilemma", parodies "dilemma" ensembles of Italian opera in the Bel canto era; in particular "D'un pensiero" from Act I of Bellini's La sonnambula. "A nice dilemma" uses the dominant rhythm and key of "D'un pensiero" and divides up some of the choral lines between the basses and higher voices to create an oom-pa-pa effect common in Italian opera choruses.

== Productions ==
After the premiere of Trial by Jury in 1875, operetta companies in London, the British provinces and elsewhere picked it up rapidly, usually playing it as a forepiece or an afterpiece to a French operetta. The first American showings were an unauthorized production by Alice Oates at the Arch Street Theatre in Philadelphia on 22 October 1875 and another at the Eagle Theatre in New York City on 15 November 1875. The world tour of the original British production took it to America, Australia, and elsewhere by 1876. It was even translated into German, and premièred as Im Schwurgericht, at the Carltheater on 14 September 1886, and as Das Brautpaar vor Gericht at Danzer's Orpheum on 5 October 1901.

Beginning in 1878 Richard D'Oyly Carte's opera companies (of which there were often several playing simultaneously) usually programmed Trial by Jury as a companion piece to The Sorcerer or H.M.S. Pinafore. (Note: In addition to the London productions mentioned below and early tours mentioned above, Carte toured Trial with The Sorcerer beginning in 1878.) In the 1884–85 London production, a pantomime-style transformation scene was added at the end, in which the Judge and Plaintiff became the Harlequinade characters Harlequin and Columbine, and the set was "consumed" by theatrical red fire and flames. From 1894, the year when the D'Oyly Carte Opera Company established a year-round touring company that had most of the Gilbert and Sullivan works in its repertory, Trial by Jury was always included, except for 1901 to 1903, and then again from 1943 until 1946, when the company played a reduced repertory during World War II. From 1919, costumes were by Percy Anderson, and a new touring set was designed by Peter Goffin in 1957.

During the company's 1975 centennial performances of all thirteen Gilbert and Sullivan Operas at the Savoy Theatre, Trial was given four times, as a curtain raiser to The Sorcerer, Pinafore and Pirates and as an afterpiece following The Grand Duke. Before the first of the four performances of Trial, a specially written curtain raiser by William Douglas-Home, called Dramatic Licence, was played by Peter Pratt as Carte, Kenneth Sandford as Gilbert and John Ayldon as Sullivan, in which Gilbert, Sullivan and Carte plan the birth of Trial in 1875. Trial by Jury was eliminated from the D'Oyly Carte repertory in 1976 as a cost-saving measure.

=== Production history ===
The following table summarises the main London productions of Trial by Jury up to the time of Sullivan's death in 1900:

Theatre	Opening date	Closing date	Perfs.	Details
Royalty Theatre	25 March 1875	11 June 1875	131	This company also played matinées at the Gaiety Theatre on 10 April, 17 April, and 24 April 1875. The theatre closed from 13 June through 10 October while the company took Trial by Jury and other operas on a provincial tour. Trial then continued as an afterpiece to French operettas at the Royalty, with Charles Morton as manager and Hamilton Clarke as musical director.
Royalty Theatre	11 October 1875	18 December 1875	131	This company also played matinées at the Gaiety Theatre on 10 April, 17 April, and 24 April 1875. The theatre closed from 13 June through 10 October while the company took Trial by Jury and other operas on a provincial tour. Trial then continued as an afterpiece to French operettas at the Royalty, with Charles Morton as manager and Hamilton Clarke as musical director.
Opera Comique	14 January 1876	5 May 1876	96	Emily Soldene and Kate Santley brought Morton's production to the Opera Comique. Trial was not performed from 13 to 18 March while Fred Sullivan was ill, and the theatre was closed for Easter from 9 to 14 April. Soldene then toured with Trial and other operettas until 28 October. Dolaro and Carte (as manager and musical director), also produced Trial in Dublin and Manchester from 24 July to 5 August 1876.
Strand Theatre	3 March 1877	26 May 1877	73	Produced "under the immediate direction of the authors". Originally performed as an afterpiece to Tom Taylor's comedy Babes and Beetles. A tour of this production followed from 27 May to 28 July, produced by Santley. At the same time, from May to September 1877, Santley toured Trial as an afterpiece to an Offenbach operetta.
Opera Comique	23 March 1878	24 May 1878	56	Played as an afterpiece to The Sorcerer
Savoy Theatre	11 October 1884	12 March 1885	150	Played as a forepiece to The Sorcerer
Savoy Theatre	22 September 1898	31 December 1898	102	Played as a forepiece to The Sorcerer
Savoy Theatre	6 June 1899	25 November 1899	174	Played as a forepiece to H.M.S. Pinafore

The exclusive performing rights to Trial by Jury and the other Gilbert and Sullivan operas were held by the D'Oyly Carte Opera Company until their expiration in 1961, 50 years after Gilbert's death, and no other professional company was authorised to present the Savoy operas in Britain from 1877 until that date. American, Australian and numerous other foreign productions continued to be produced after 1875, and after 1961 professional productions by various other companies returned to Britain; in the 21st century, the opera continues to be produced frequently.

The following tables show the casts of the principal original D'Oyly Carte productions and touring companies at approximately 10-year intervals through to the 1975 centenary season. (Note: An examination of Rollins and Witts and Gänzl shows that a ten-year interval is sufficient to indicate the bulk of the notable performers who portrayed these roles in authorized productions during that period. Biographies of the persons named below can be found at Stone, David. Who Was Who in the D'Oyly Carte Opera Company, The Gilbert and Sullivan Archive, accessed 8 June 2014.)

Role	Royalty Theatre 1875	Strand Theatre 1877	Opera Comique 1878	Savoy Theatre 1884	Savoy Theatre 1898
Learned Judge	Frederic Sullivan	J. G. Taylor	George Grossmith	Rutland Barrington	Henry Lytton
Counsel	John Hollingsworth	Charles Parry	Rutland Barrington	Eric Lewis	Jones Hewson
Defendant	Walter H. Fisher	Claude Marius	George Power	Durward Lely	Cory James
Foreman	Charles Kelleher	W. S. Penley	F. Talbot	Arthur Kennett	Leonard Russell
Usher	Belville R. Pepper	Harry Cox	Fred Clifton	William Lugg	Walter Passmore
Associate				J. Wilbraham	Charles Childerstone
Plaintiff	Nelly Bromley	Lottie Venne	Lisa Walton	Florence Dysart	Isabel Jay
1st Bridesmaid	Linda Verner	Gwynne Williams		Sybil Grey	Mildred Baker

Role	D'Oyly Carte 1905 Tour	D'Oyly Carte 1915 Tour	D'Oyly Carte 1925 Tour	D'Oyly Carte 1935 Tour
Learned Judge	Charles H. Workman	Leo Sheffield	Leo Sheffield	Sydney Granville
Counsel	Albert Kavanagh	Frederick Hobbs	Henry Millidge	Leslie Rands
Defendant	Strafford Moss	Dewey Gibson	Sidney Pointer	Robert Wilson
Foreman	J. Lewis Campion	Frank Steward	T. Penry Hughes	T. Penry Hughes
Usher	Reginald White	George Sinclair	Joseph Griffin	Richard Walker
Associate		Allen Morris	Martyn Green	C. William Morgan
Plaintiff	Bessie Mackenzie	Marjorie Gordon	Eleanor Evans	Ann Drummond-Grant
1st Bridesmaid	Mabel Burnege	Ethel Armit	Beatrice Elburn	Nancy Ray

Role	D'Oyly Carte 1949 Tour	D'Oyly Carte 1955 Tour	D'Oyly Carte 1965 Tour	D'Oyly Carte 1975 Tour
Learned Judge	Richard Watson	John Reed	Jeffrey Skitch	Jon Ellison
Counsel	Alan Styler	Alan Styler	Alan Styler	Michael Rayner
Defendant	Leonard Osborn	John Fryatt	Philip Potter	Jeffrey Cresswell
Foreman	Donald Harris	John Banks	Anthony Raffell	James Conroy-Ward
Usher	L. Radley Flynn	George Cook	George Cook	John Broad
Associate	C. William Morgan	Keith Bonnington	Keith Bonnington	William Palmerley
Plaintiff	Enid Walsh	Kathleen West	Jennifer Toye	Marjorie Williams
1st Bridesmaid	Joyce Wright	Margaret Dobson	Pauline Wales	Rosalind Griffiths

== Benefit performances ==
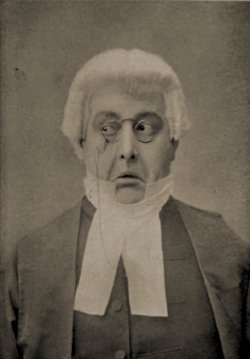
Rutland Barrington as the Learned Judge

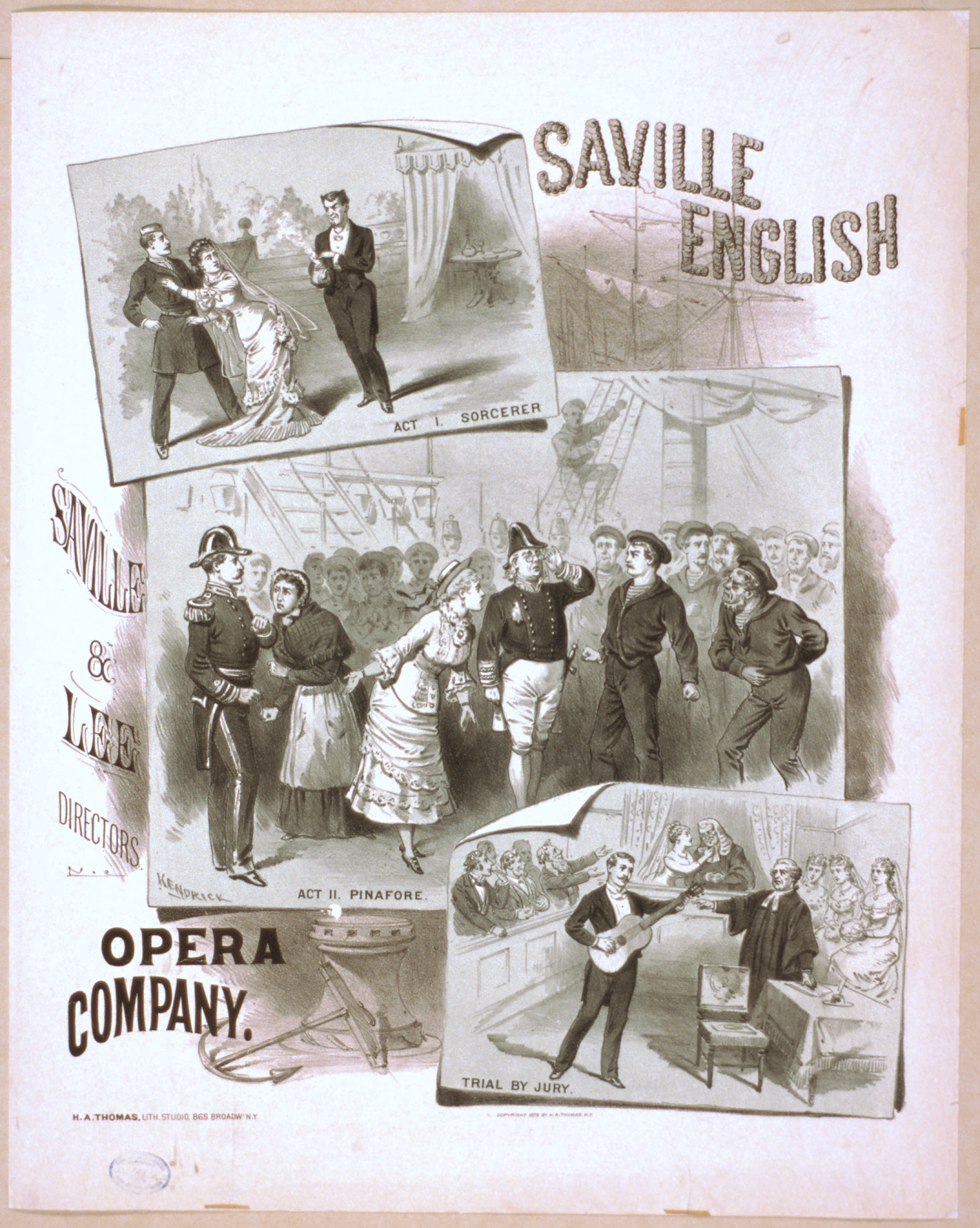
Poster advertising operettas by Gilbert & Sullivan; includes Trial by Jury

Starting in 1877, Trial by Jury was often given at benefit performances, usually for an actor or actress who had fallen on hard times, but occasionally for other causes. These were glittering affairs, with various celebrities appearing in principal roles or as part of the chorus. Gilbert himself played the silent role of the Associate on at least four occasions.

Arthur Sullivan conducted the 1877 benefit for the actor Henry Compton. At the Compton benefit, Penley and George Grossmith were members of the Jury, and a number of other famous actors and actresses were in the chorus. Sullivan also conducted the 1889 benefit for Barrington.

At the Nellie Farren benefit, many of the performers listed below sat in the jury or the gallery, and Trial by Jury was followed by a six-hour-long concert. Performances were given by Henry Irving, Ellaline Terriss, Marie Tempest, Hayden Coffin, Arthur Roberts, Letty Lind, Edmund Payne and many others.

The Ellen Terry benefit in 1906 was also a particularly well-attended affair, with Sir Arthur Conan Doyle numbered among the jury and Enrico Caruso singing, among many star performances.

Role	Henry Compton Drury Lane 1 March 1877 (Note: The chorus included leading stars such as W. S. Penley, George Grossmith, Kate Bishop and Marion Terry.)	Amy Roselle Lyceum 16 June 1887	Rutland Barrington Savoy 28 May 1889	Nellie Farren Drury Lane 17 March 1898
Judge	George Honey	Rutland Barrington	Rutland Barrington	Rutland Barrington
Counsel	George Fox	Richard Temple	Alec Marsh	Eric Lewis
Defendant	W. H. Cummings	Henry Bracy	Courtice Pounds	Courtice Pounds
Foreman			Mr. Burbank	Henry Lytton
Usher	Arthur Cecil	Rudolph Lewis	W. H. Denny	Walter Passmore
Associate	W. S. Gilbert	Arthur Roberts		W. S. Gilbert
Plaintiff	Pauline Rita	Geraldine Ulmar	Lottie Venne	Florence Perry

Role	Princess Christian's Homes of Rest for Disabled Soldiers Drury Lane, 15 May 1900	William Rignold Lyric Theatre 5 December 1902	Ellen Terry Drury Lane 12 June 1906
Judge	Rutland Barrington	Rutland Barrington	Rutland Barrington
Counsel	Eric Lewis	C. Hayden Coffin	Henry Lytton
Defendant	Courtice Pounds	Charles Childerstone	Courtice Pounds
Foreman	W. H. Denny	Fred Kaye	Robert Marshall
Usher	Walter Passmore	George Grossmith Jr.	Walter Passmore
Associate	W. S. Gilbert	^{1}	W. S. Gilbert
Associate's Wife^{2}	Effie Bancroft	—	Fanny Brough
Counsel^{3}	—	Lionel Monckton	—
Plaintiff	Florence St. John	Evie Greene	Ruth Vincent

^{1}W. S. Gilbert was due to play the part but did not; the name of the person who played the role is not reported.

^{2}This role does not appear in other performances of the opera.

^{3}This role does not appear in other performances of the opera.

== Recordings ==
Trial by Jury has been recorded many times. Of the recordings by the D'Oyly Carte Opera Company, those recorded in 1927 and 1964 are ranked the best, according to the "Gilbert and Sullivan Discography", edited by Marc Shepherd. The 1961 Sargent and especially the 1995 Mackerras recordings are also rated highly by the Discography. The reviewer Michael Walters gives his highest praise to the 1927 recording, but he also likes the 1961 recording.

The Discography recommends the 1982 Brent Walker video, which is paired with Cox and Box. More recent professional productions have been recorded on video by the International Gilbert and Sullivan Festival.

Selected recordings

- 1927 D'Oyly Carte – Conductor: Harry Norris
- 1961 Sargent/Glyndebourne – Pro Arte Orchestra, Glyndebourne Festival Chorus, Conductor: Sir Malcolm Sargent
- 1964 D'Oyly Carte – Conductor: Isidore Godfrey
- 1975 D'Oyly Carte – Conductor: Royston Nash
- 1982 Brent Walker Productions video – Ambrosian Opera Chorus, London Symphony Orchestra, Conductor: Alexander Faris
- 1995 Mackerras/Telarc – Orchestra and Chorus of the Welsh National Opera, Conductor: Sir Charles Mackerras
- 2005 Opera Australia video (modern dress) – Stage Director: Stuart Maunder; conductor: Andrew Greene

== Textual changes ==
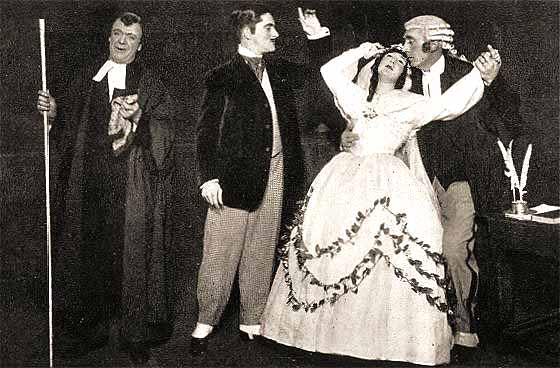
The Plaintiff, in "distress", captures the sympathy of the judge and jury. Production with Sydney Granville, 1919

Before the first performance of Trial by Jury, some material was cut, including two songs and a recitative: a song for the foreman of the jury, "Oh, do not blush to shed a tear", which was to be sung just after "Oh, will you swear by yonder skies"; and a recitative for the Judge and song for the Usher, "We do not deal with artificial crime" and "His lordship's always quits", which came just before "A nice dilemma". The melody for "His Lordship's always quits" is known, and it was reused in "I loved her fondly" in The Zoo and later modified into the main tune from "A wand'ring minstrel, I" in The Mikado. A few changes were made to the end of "I love him, I love him!" after the first night. A third verse for "Oh, gentlemen, listen I pray" was sung, at least on the first night, and part was quoted in a review in the Pictorial World.

Trial by Jury underwent relatively minor textual changes after its first run, mainly consisting of insignificant amendments to wording. The most significant changes involve the ending. The original stage directions set up a simple pantomime-style tableau:

Judge and Plaintiff dance back, hornpipe step, and get onto the Bench – the Bridesmaids take the eight garlands of roses from behind the Judge's desk and draw them across floor of court, so that they radiate from the desk. Two plaster Cupids in bar wigs descend from flies. Red fire.

This became much more elaborate in the 1884 revival, with the entire set being transformed, and the plaintiff climbing onto the Judge's back "à la fairy". In the 1920s, the plaster cupids were evidently damaged on a tour, and the transformation scene was abandoned completely.

== Notes, references and sources ==
=== Sources ===
- Ainger, Michael (2002). Gilbert and Sullivan – A Dual Biography. Oxford: Oxford University Press. ISBN 978-0-19-514769-8.
- Allen, Reginald (1958). The First Night Gilbert and Sullivan. London: Chappell. OCLC 3156011.
- Allen, Reginald (1975a). The First Night Gilbert and Sullivan [Centennial Edition]. London: Chappell. OCLC 550681465.
- Allen, Reginald (1975b). Sir Arthur Sullivan: Composer and Personage. New York: The Pierpont Morgan Library. ISBN 978-0-87598-049-2.
- Archer, William (1882). "Mr. W. S. Gilbert". English Dramatists of To-Day. London: Low, Marston, Searle and Rivington. OCLC 963632829.
- Bradley, Ian (1996). The Complete Annotated Gilbert and Sullivan. Oxford: Oxford University Press. ISBN 978-0-19-816503-3.
- Browne, Edith A. (1907). Stars of the Stage: W. S. Gilbert. London: John Lane, The Bodley Head. OCLC 5866733.
- Burgess, A. J. (1997). The Notary and other Lawyers in Gilbert & Sullivan. Hadleigh, Suffolk: Jardine Press. ISBN 978-0-9525594-1-2.
- Crowther, Andrew (2000). Contradiction Contradicted – The Plays of W. S. Gilbert. London: Associated University Presses. ISBN 978-0-8386-3839-2.
- Davis, Richard Harding (ed. Charles Belmont Davis) (1995). Adventures and Letters of Richard Harding Davis. Project Gutenberg. ISBN 978-0-8386-3839-2.
- Dark, Sidney and Rowland Grey (1923). W. S. Gilbert: His Life and Letters. Ayer Publishing. ISBN 978-0-405-08430-0.
- Fitzgerald, Percy Hetherington (1899). The Savoy Opera and the Savoyards. London: Chatto & Windus. OCLC 4635323. "Trial by Jury Fisher Sullivan Bromley Pepper."
- Gänzl, Kurt (1986). The British Musical Theatre—Volume I, 1865–1914. Oxford: Oxford University Press. ISBN 978-0-333-39839-5.
- Gänzl, Kurt (2021). Gilbert and Sullivan: The Players and the Plays. Albany, New York: State University of New York Press. ISBN 978-1-4384-8545-4.
- Gilbert, W. S. & Sullivan, Arthur (1912). Trial by Jury (Vocal Score). London: Chappell. OCLC 48594935.
- Goldberg, Isaac (1929). The Story of Gilbert and Sullivan, or The 'Compleat' Savoyard. London: John Murray. OCLC 758343552.
- Jacobs, Arthur (1986). Arthur Sullivan: A Victorian Musician. Oxford: Oxford University Press. ISBN 978-0-19-282033-4.
- Lawrence, Arthur (1899). Sir Arthur Sullivan, Life Story, Letters and Reminiscences (1907 ed.). London: Duffield. OCLC 1303888.
- McElroy, George C. (1984). "Whose Zoo; or, When Did The Trial Begin?". Nineteenth Century Theatre Research. 12: 39–54.
- MacQueen-Pope, W. J. (1947). Carriages at Eleven. London: Hutchinson. OCLC 155797891.
- Rollins, Cyril; R. John Witts (1962). The D'Oyly Carte Opera Company in Gilbert and Sullivan Operas: A Record of Productions, 1875–1961. London: Michael Joseph. OCLC 504581419. Also, four supplements, privately printed.
- Stedman, Jane W. (1996). W. S. Gilbert, A Classic Victorian & His Theatre. Oxford University Press. ISBN 0-19-816174-3.
- Walbrook, H. M. (1922). Gilbert & Sullivan Opera: A History and A Comment. London: F. V. White. OCLC 3303311.
- Wilson, Robin; Frederic Lloyd (1984). Gilbert & Sullivan – The Official D'Oyly Carte Picture History. New York: Alfred A. Knopf. ISBN 978-0-394-54113-6.
- Young, Percy M. (1971). Sir Arthur Sullivan. London: J. M. Dent. ISBN 0-460-03934-2.
