= Charles Collette =

British composer, actor and writer

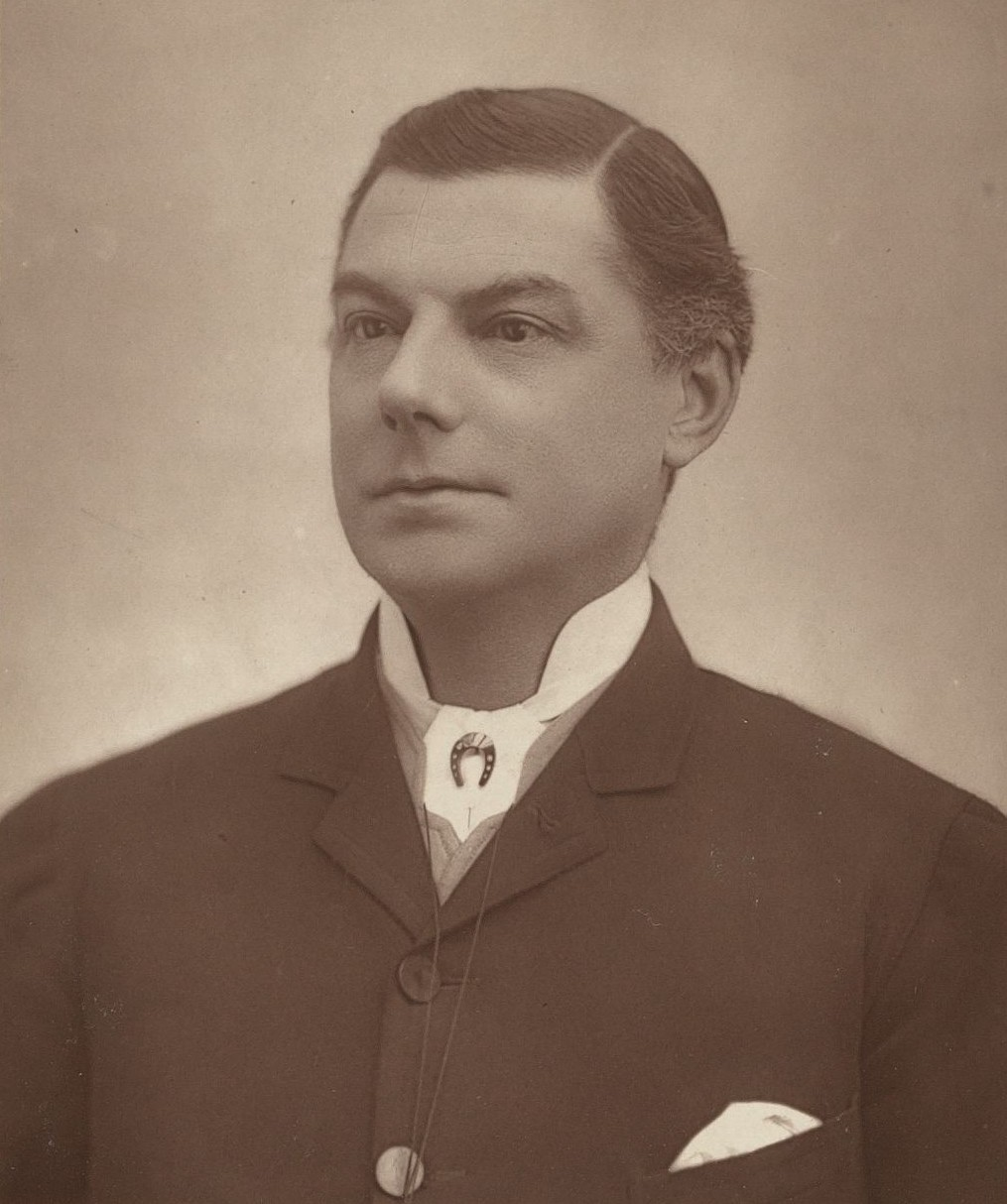
Charles Collette in Bootles' Baby, c. 1888

Charles Henry Collette (29 July 1842 – 10 February 1924) was an English stage actor, composer and writer noted for his work in comedy in a long career onstage. He appeared, beginning in the late 1860s, in many Bancroft productions and was engaged by other managers, including J. L. Toole, John Hollingshead, Mary Anderson, Lydia Thompson and Herbert Beerbohm Tree, as well as performing in his own companies. He toured for some years as the title character in F. C. Burnand's The Colonel and played many military men.

Collette continued acting in London and in the British provinces until 1907, a career of nearly four decades, but he is probably best remembered today for the presence of his musical play Cryptoconchoidsyphonostomata on the bill with the historic 1875 premiere of Gilbert and Sullivan's Trial by Jury.

== Early life and acting career ==
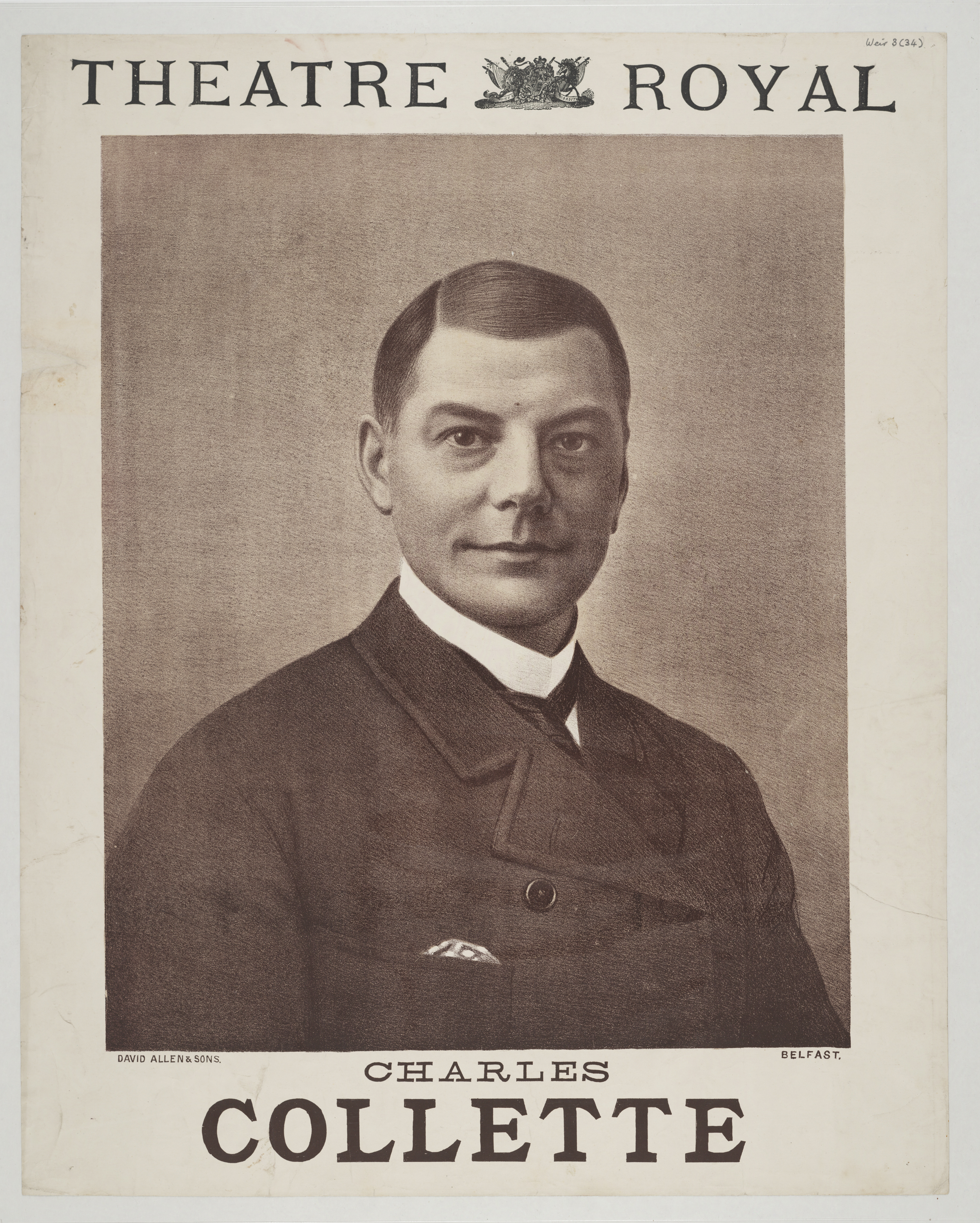
Poster of Collette, c. 1865

Collette was born in London, the son of Charles Hastings Collette, a solicitor, and his wife, Frances Mary, née Sharpe, and the grandson of General Collette of the Madras Cavalry. As a young man, he held a commission in the Dragoon Guards. He left the army in 1868, and, having enjoyed amateur theatricals while serving in India, he was attracted by a stage career. A mutual friend put him in touch with Marie Bancroft, who cast him as Charles Hampton, a light romantic role, in a comedy, Tame Cats at the Prince of Wales's Theatre. He made an immediate impression. The magazine Fun published an article with the title "Tame Cats; Or, The Triumph of Collette"; this, however, was not so much a tribute to the actor as a rebuke to his over-enthusiastic friends in the audience.

Over the succeeding years, Collette appeared in many Bancroft productions, including School by T. W. Robertson, Sheridan's The School for Scandal (as Sir Oliver Surface), The Merchant of Venice, and Edward Bulwer-Lytton's Money. Another classic role that Collette played was Mr. Puff in The Critic. He was engaged by other managers, notably J. L. Toole, John Hollingshead, Mary Anderson, Lydia Thompson and Herbert Beerbohm Tree, among others, as well as touring his own companies. He appeared in plays by a wide variety of authors besides Shakespeare, Sheridan and Robertson, including stage adaptations of Dickens novels. In 1879, his attempt at theatrical management ended in financial disaster, sending him into bankruptcy for several years and drawing his solicitor father to the brink of professional ruin.

Collette toured for some years as Colonel Woottwweell Woodd in F. C. Burnand's The Colonel. Woodd was one of his favourite roles; others included Sergeant Jones in Robertson's Ours, Colonel Berners in They're Smith's Cut off with a Shilling, Adonis Evergreen in Charles Mathews's My Awful Dad, Autolycus in The Winter's Tale, and Private Saunders in Bootles' Baby, an adaptation by Hugh Moss of a popular novelette by J. S. Winter. He was often referred to as the "soldier-actor"; not only did he play a large number of military men, there was, The Times said, "no mistaking that he had been in the Army. Tall and upright, with a broad chest and shoulders, he looked even when quite old the perfect type of a healthy Englishman."

In 1887, Collett performed his own comic sketch at the Alhambra Theatre, called Charles Collette at Home. The sketch included several patter songs and a comic lecture upon Natural History. In 1894 he played Captain Crook in Wapping Old Stairs at the Vaudeville Theatre. Collette continued acting in London and in the British provinces until 1907, when he played Mr. Micawber in an adaptation of David Copperfield, and in In the Bishop's Carriage at the Waldorf Theatre. He also appeared in concerts, and, towards the end of his life performed in "variety" shows. He also created illustrations later in his life.

== Writing and personal life ==
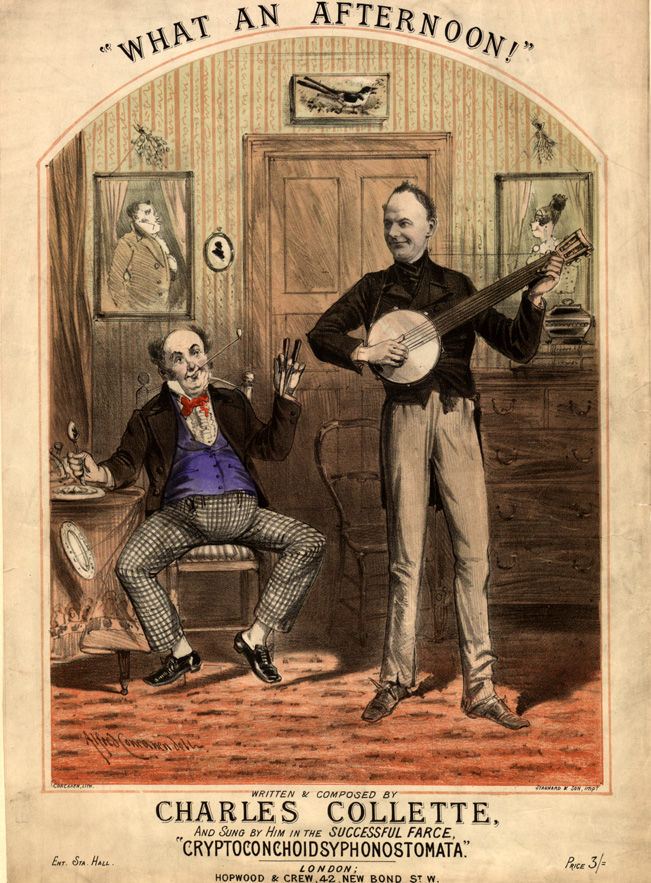
Sheet music for Collette's popular song from Cryptoconchoidsyphonostomata

In addition to performing, Collette wrote a number of his own works, including the "successful romantic extravaganza" improbably titled Cryptoconchoidsyphonostomata, or While It's to be Had. This play was on the bill at the Royalty Theatre, with Collette in the lead and managed by Richard D'Oyly Carte, when Gilbert and Sullivan's Trial by Jury was premiered in 1875. Collette's song from the piece, "What an Afternoon!", became popular. The simple form of the lyric, with its title repeated every other line, caught the public fancy:

His trousers' sleeves were bright green-red,
What an afternoon!
With velvet collar of white black lead;
What an afternoon!
He also moved his legs when he walked,
What an afternoon!
And he generally spoke when he usually talked;
What an afternoon!

The popularity of the song prompted unauthorized distribution of the words and music. Collette successfully sued a man named Goode, causing one paper to comment that the song should be retitled "What a Goode Afternoon".

Offstage, Collette was an enthusiastic collector of Staffordshire china, and was a long-standing and popular member of the Savage Club. He married Blanche Julia Wilton (1851–1934), the younger sister of Lady Bancroft, with whom he had one daughter.

Collette died at his home near Kew Gardens at the age of 81.
