= Charles Hastings Collette =

British lawyer and writer (1816–1901)

Charles Hastings Collette (1816–1901) was a British 19th-century solicitor and writer of Protestant popular controversialist apologetics. He was the father of actor Charles Henry Collette and the organizer of the Joseph Mendham library. As a volunteer in the First Middlesex Artillery, he compiled a handbook for drill instruction.

His Novelties of Romanism, developed from a sermon, was translated into Spanish and, from Spanish, into Portuguese (under the translated name of Carlos Hastings Collette) and remains in print to this day.

== Partial Bibliography ==
- Collette, Charles Hastings (1842), The Novelties of Romanism: Or, Popery Refuted by Tradition (sermon), St. Andrew's Church, Manchester: Grant & Bolton; RM Tims; W Curry, Jun & Co; J. Robertson.
- Collette, Charles Hastings (1864) [1860], The Novelties of Romanism: Addressed to the Right Rev. Dr. Goss (2 ed.), London: The Religious tract society.
- Collette, Charles Hastings (1866), Dr. Newman and his Religious Opinions, London: John F. Shaw and Co..
- Collette, Charles Hastings (1869), A Reply to Cobbett's "History of the Protestant Reformation in England and Ireland", London: S.W. Partridge & Co.
- Collette, Charles Hastings (1887), The Life, Times and Writings of Thomas Cranmer D.D., London: George Redway.
- Collette, Charles Hastings (1890), Queen Elizabeth and the penal laws : with an introduction on William Cobbett's "History of the Protestant reformation" : passing in review the reigns of Henry VIII, Edward VI, and Mary, London: Protestant Alliance.
- Collette, Carlos Hastings (2001) [Dias, Guilherme transl. Castilian, 1912, Lisbon, PT: Livraria Evangélica], Inovações do romanismo: em ordem cronológica [The Novelties of Romanism: in chronological order] (in Portuguese), André, José transl. from the Spanish; Martins, Eline Alves cover, layout, Vila Romana, São Paulo, SP, BR: Parakletos.
