= Kurt Gänzl =

New Zealand writer, historian and former casting director (born 1946)

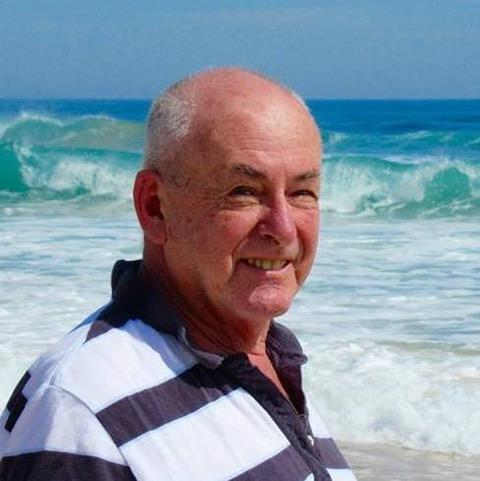
- Kurt Gänzl in 2018
- Born: Brian Roy Gallas; 15 February 1946 (age 80); Wellington, New Zealand
- Education: University of Canterbury
- Occupations: Writer, historian Former casting director and singer
- Notable work: The Encyclopedia of the Musical Theatre (1994, 2001)
- Partner: Ian Bevan (died 2006)
- Relatives: John Gallas (brother)

Kurt-Friedrich Gänzl (born 15 February 1946) is a New Zealand writer, historian and former casting director and singer best known for his books about musical theatre.

After a decade-long playwriting, acting and singing career, and a second career as a casting director of West End shows, Gänzl became one of the world's most important chroniclers of musical theatre history. According to Christophe Mirambeau of Canal Académie, "Kurt Gänzl is an institution. No one interested in musicals and operetta can ignore that. He is the world reference – with some few others, like Gerald Bordman, Ken Bloom, or Andrew Lamb – for that subject." He has written more than a dozen books on musical theatre topics, as well as blogs and articles about musicals, light opera and people, especially of the Victorian era, involved with the musical stage. He has also translated French poetry.

== Early life and career ==
Gänzl was born Brian Roy Gallas in Wellington, New Zealand, and is of Austrian descent, the son of Frederick, né Fritz Eduard Gänzl, an educator who moved to New Zealand before World War II and became Headmaster of Wellington Technical College and who adopted the name Fred Gallas, and his wife Nancy, née Agnes Ada Welsh. He studied law and classics at the University of Canterbury in New Zealand, receiving a master's degree in 1967 while performing as a radio and concert vocalist.

Early in his career, Gänzl wrote plays. His one-act plays Elektra and The Women of Troy were produced in New Zealand in 1966 and 1967 by Elmwood Players. The latter play won the British Drama League (Drama magazine) award in 1967. The next year, Gänzl joined the New Zealand Opera Company as a bass soloist. After the company closed in 1968, he moved to London and studied for a year at the London Opera Centre. For several more years, he worked as a performer, including a 1969 season in the hit London show, The Black and White Minstrels, and afterwards in Monte Carlo and on cruise ships. His last show was the 1974 production of Tommy Steele's adaptation of Hans Andersen at the London Palladium. Throughout the 1980s, together with his domestic partner, the theatrical agent Ian Bevan, he worked as a talent agent and as a casting director for Harold Fielding on over a dozen musicals and plays in London's West End theatres and for musical and operatic productions in Europe, Australia and America.

== Writing and later years ==
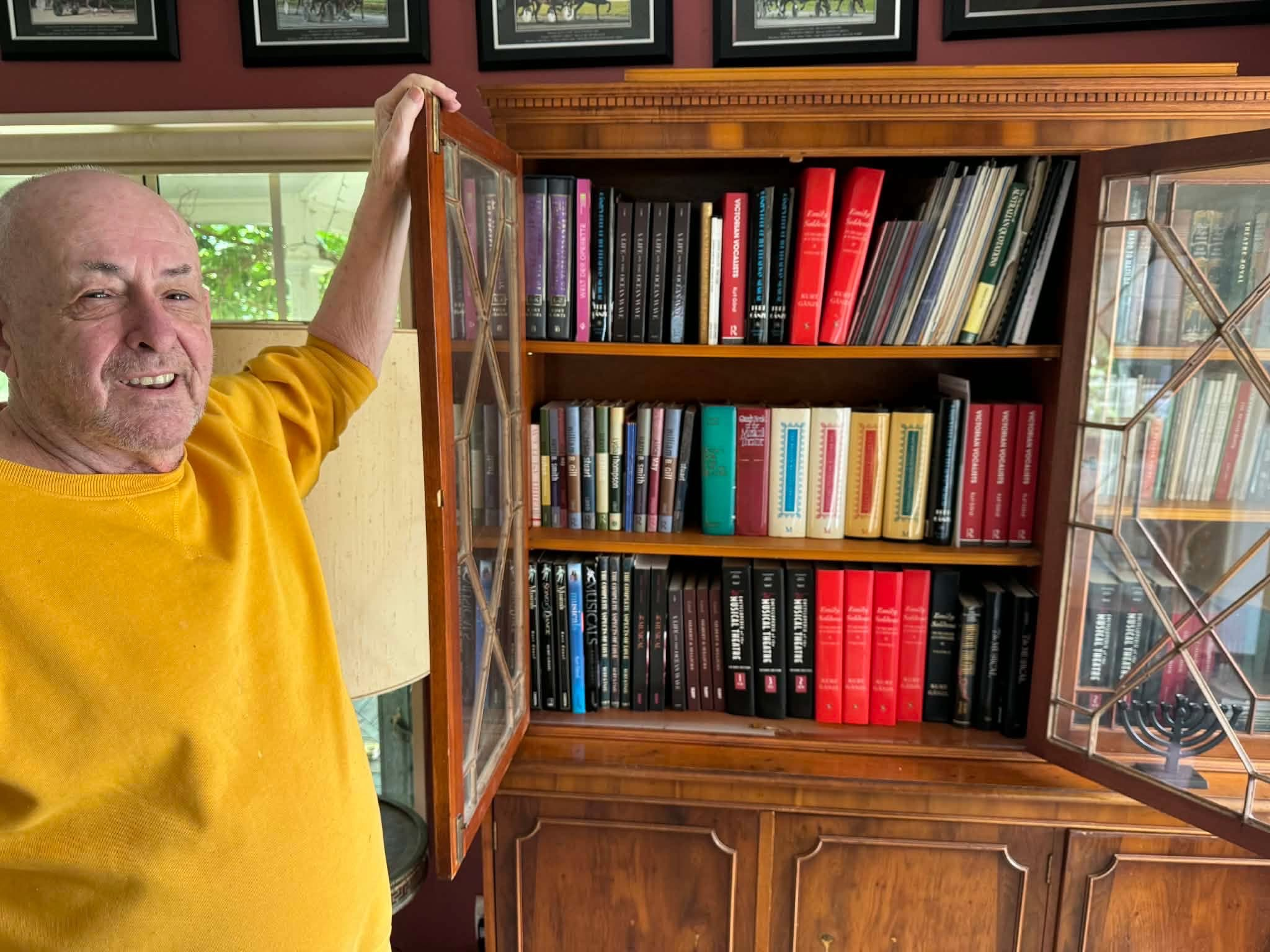
Gänzl at home in 2026 with a display of the books he has authored

While still working as a casting director, Gänzl began writing theatre reference works. In 1986 he published his two-volume history, The British Musical Theatre (1986), which won the Roger Machell Prize for the year's best performing-arts book and the British Library Association's McColvin Medal for the outstanding reference work (any subject) of its season. This was followed by Gänzl's Book of the Musical Theatre (1988 with Andrew Lamb) and The Blackwell Guide to the Musical Theater on Record (1989). At the end of the 1980s, Gänzl moved to St. Paul de Vence in the south of France with Bevan to concentrate on writing full-time. In the 1990s, he published The Complete 'Aspects of Love' (1990), five editions of Musicals (1995; US: Song and Dance: The Complete Story of Stage Musicals), and The Musical: A Concise History (1997).

=== The Encyclopedia of the Musical Theatre ===
Gänzl's seminal reference work, The Encyclopedia of the Musical Theatre, was published in 1994 and greatly expanded in a second edition in 2001. It was a Dartmouth Medal honoree in 1995 and was awarded "Outstanding Reference Source" in 1997 by the American Library Association. Theatre historian John Kenrick wrote: "Only serious research libraries carry this set listing thousands of shows and individuals. This expanded update of the 1995 original edition is the best source to date on European musicals, with solid coverage of Broadway too." Another critic calls it "the most exhaustive study anyone has yet made of musicals, and it is difficult to imagine it being done in a better or more thorough way."

The Times wrote, "So, with The Encyclopaedia of the Musical Theatre, Kurt Gänzl ... has transcended all rivals. His work embraces not only Broadway and Shaftesbury Avenue, but Vienna and Budapest, Paris and Rome, Sydney and Toronto. He even apologises for including only three New Zealand entries. If there is a musical production of any kind that he does not know about, then it is odds-on that nobody else does either." Gänzl has said, "My goals are to make the musical theater a respectable academic subject and to put the musical theater into its international context. I want to bring the so-called 'musical' and 'operetta' back together as part of the same art form and to dispel some of the early myths and quasi-historical errors and distortions that have become accepted as part of musical theater history."

=== Later years ===
In the early 2000s, Gänzl and Bevan moved to a home in Sefton, New Zealand, where Gänzl completed biographies of Victorian burlesque queen Lydia Thompson, Broadway author William Gill and Victorian singing star Emily Soldene, and in 2017 a compendium of 100 biographies titled Victorian Vocalists. After Bevan's death in 2006, Gänzl spent time as a musical critic in Berlin, Germany, and then lived in Yamba, Australia.

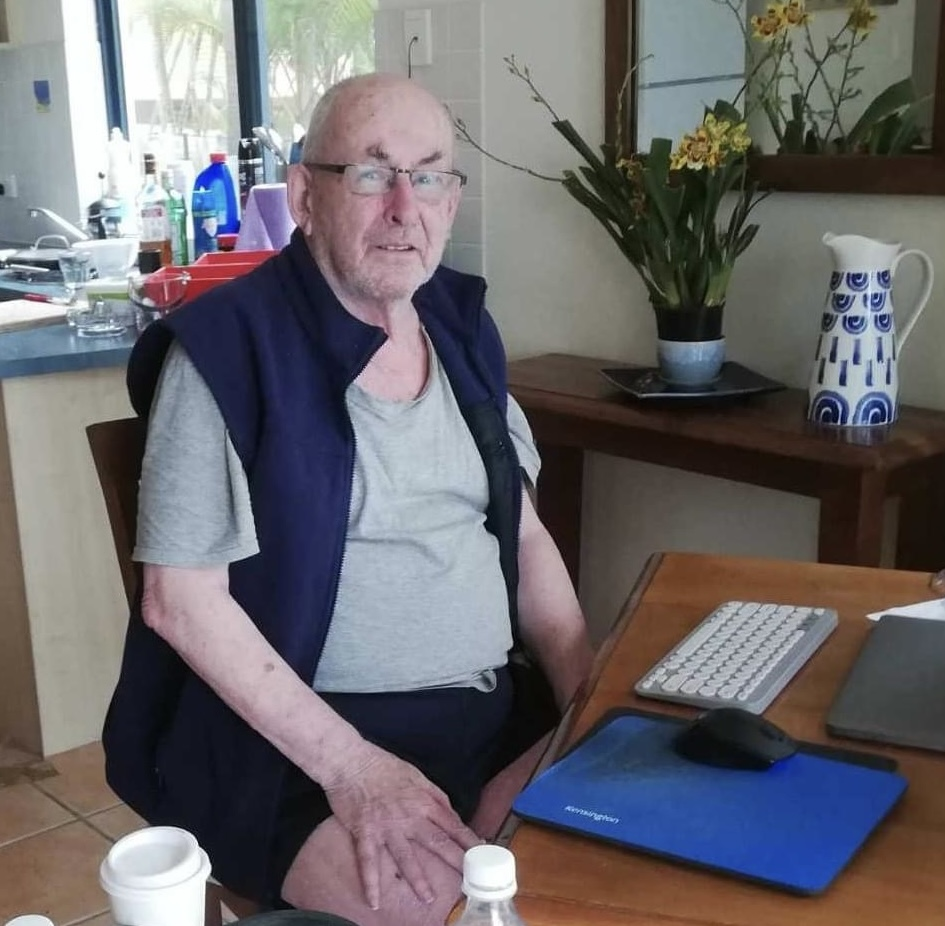
Gänzl at home in 2024

Gänzl has published more than a dozen books on musical theatre and contributed many biographical entries to the Oxford Dictionary of National Biographies and Grove's Dictionary of Music and Musicians. He has also published biographies elsewhere, such as for Theatre Heritage Australia. Since 2007 he has contributed more than a thousand entries about Victorian and Edwardian singers, actors and musical theatre works, on his blog Kurt of Gerolstein. Over the years he has also worked with his younger brother, the poet John Gallas, on translations of works by Baudelaire, Verhaeren, Materlinck, Yourcenar, Anna de Noailles, Nerval, Florian and others, including Borel's Rhapsodies (2022).

Gänzl has an avid interest in the sport of harness racing and has owned and bred racehorses.

== Books ==
- 1986: The British Musical Theatre (2 vols.; Macmillan Press) ISBN 0-19-520509-X
- 1988: Gänzl's Book of the Musical Theatre (with Andrew Lamb; Bodley Head/Schirmer) ISBN 0-02-871941-7
- 1989: The Blackwell Guide to the Musical Theatre on Record. Blackwell ISBN 0-631-16517-7
- 1990: The Complete "Aspects of Love" (Aurum Press) ISBN 0-670-83192-1
- 1994: The Encyclopedia of the Musical Theatre (Blackwell/Schirmer; 2 vols, expanded in 2001 to 3 vols.) ISBN 0-02-864970-2
- 1995: Musicals: the Illustrated Story (Carlton) ISBN 0-7475-2381-9
  - 1995 (US edition of same): Song and Dance: The Complete Story of Stage Musicals (Smithmark Publishers) ISBN 0-8317-1890-0
- 1995: Gänzl's Book of the Broadway Musical (Schirmer; Macmillan) ISBN 0-02-870832-6
- 1997: The Musical: A Concise History (Boston: Northeastern University Press ISBN 1-55553-311-6
- 2002: Lydia Thompson: Queen of Burlesque (NY & London: Routledge) ISBN 0-415-93766-3
- 2002: William B. Gill: From the Gold Fields to Broadway (Routledge) ISBN 0-415-93767-1
- 2007: Emily Soldene: In Search of a Singer (Steele Roberts) ISBN 978-1-877338-72-4
- 2017: Victorian Vocalists (Taylor and Francis) ISBN 978-1-1381-0317-7
- 2021: Gilbert and Sullivan: The Players and the Plays (State University of New York Press) ISBN 978-1-4384-8545-4
- 2022: Rhapsodies 1831: Petrus Borel translated with John Gallas (Carcanet Classics) ISBN 978-1800172203
- 2022: The Musical: A Concise History (2022 version) with Jamie Findlay (State University of New York Press) ISBN 978-1-4384-8751-9
- 2026: Editor: A Life on the Ocean Wave: The Story of Henry Russell second, revised edition, with Andrew Lamb (State University of New York Press) ISBN 979-8855805994
