= Emily Soldene =

English singer, actress, director, theatre manager, novelist and journalist

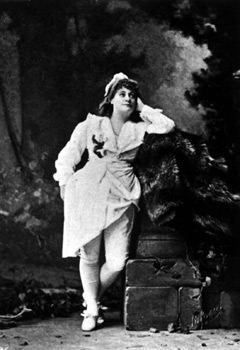
Emily Soldene, c. 1875

Emily Soldene (30 September 1838 – 8 April 1912) was an English singer, actress, director, theatre manager, novelist and journalist of the late Victorian era and the Edwardian period. She was one of the most famous singers of comic opera in the late nineteenth century, as well as an important director of theatre companies and later a celebrated gossip columnist.

== Life and career ==
Soldene was born in Clerkenwell, London. Her mother was Priscilla Swain Fuller (1812–1900), and although she was apparently the product of a bigamous marriage, she was raised as the daughter of Edward Fuller Solden (1805–1873). In 1859 she married law clerk John Powell (1834?–1881) and gave birth to her first child before she began to study singing in 1861 with William Howard Glover.

=== Early career and peak years ===
Soldene made her first public appearance in a concert given by Glover in 1862. She began to appear in classical music concerts at St James's Hall in London soon afterwards, but in 1865 she auditioned for Charles Morton at the Canterbury Music Hall. He became a friend and mentor to her, and she then turned from classical music to music hall, appearing steadily at the Oxford Music Hall and elsewhere under the name of Miss Fitz-Henry.

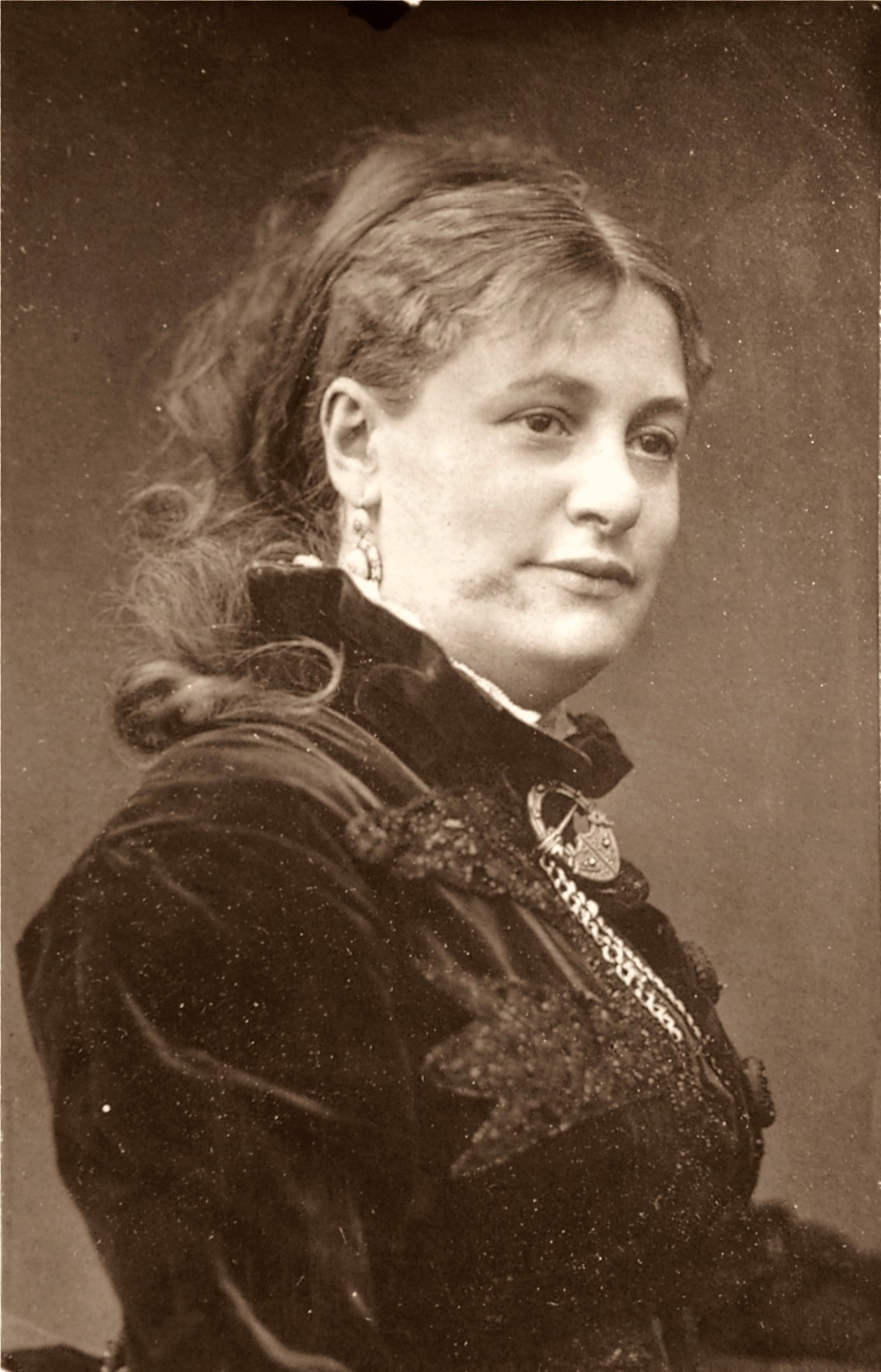
Emily Soldene

As English-language versions of French opéra bouffe first arrived in Britain, Soldene soon became the leading proponent of Jacques Offenbach and Hervé, combining her comedic and vocal talents. According to The Times, "Soldene was a fine and a highly-trained Singer. Exeter Hall loved her in oratorio no less than the Canterbury, the Oxford or the Alhambra [loved her] in more worldly work; but it was in opéra-bouffe that her voice, her vivacity, and her magnetism first found their perfect material." She played the title role in The Grand Duchess of Gerolstein in 1867, with the touring company of the Royal Opera House, Covent Garden, and in 1870. Also in 1870, at the Lyceum Theatre, she played Marguerite in Little Faust (Le petit Faust) and took over title role in Chilpéric. The next year, she toured as Chilpéric in the provinces. For Charles Morton, in 1871 at the Islington Philharmonic, she first appeared as Drogan in the long-running production of Geneviève de Brabant (also directing the production), which became her favourite role. Now widely popular, she starred at the Gaiety Theatre, London, in 1872 in another production of Geneviève de Brabant and as Mlle. Lange in La fille de Madame Angot in 1873. Soldene was also, for several years, a principal boy in British Christmas pantomimes.

Her popularity allowed her to become the manager of her own company, leading an extensive and highly successful tour of America in 1874–1875. There the company played the same operettas that she had made famous in Britain, as well as Madame l'archiduc. Soldene wrote, "From the first moment of going into management – recognizing the attractive force of female beauty – I surrounded myself with the best-looking and best set-up girls that could possibly be found. I selected my chorus from the ballet. The result, a minimum of voice, perhaps, but certainly a maximum of good looks and grace.... They felt the music, were full of life, and, like a blooded horse, were anxious for a start."

Back in England, in January 1876, Trial by Jury was transferred, by arrangement with manager Charles Morton, to the Opera Comique, where Soldene's half-sister, Clara Vesey, sang the role of the Plaintiff, together with Fred Sullivan and W. S. Penley, while Soldene and Kate Santley appeared in Madame l'Archiduc and, from March 1876, Soldene, Vesey and Penley appeared in a revival of Geneviève de Brabant. Soldene continued to tour her operetta repertory throughout Britain.

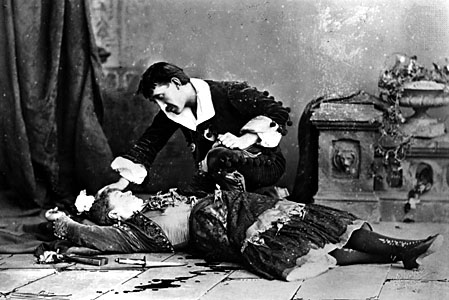
Soldene as Carmen, 1880

In 1877–1878, she travelled to Australasia and again to America. She starred in her usual repertory with the English Comic Opera Company, adding La belle Hélène, Barbe-bleue, Trial by Jury, The Waterman, Poulet et Poulette, Giroflé-Girofla, La Périchole, and La jolie parfumeuse. Back in London in 1879, she played Princess Fanfreluche in La poule aux oeufs d'or and other productions at the Alhambra Theatre. Later the same year, Soldene introduced Bizet's opera Carmen for the first time to the British provinces, in English.

=== Later stage career ===
Soon afterwards, Soldene's husband died, leaving her a single mother of four. In March 1882, Soldene's opera company (including Alice May) were touring the British provinces, when a train on which they were travelling narrowly escaped a high-speed collision with an express train. Soldene, May and other members of the company were slightly injured falling off their beds as the quick-thinking engineer of a loose engine "ran full tilt at" the train Soldene's company were riding and quickly pushed it out of the way of the oncoming express train.

An unsuccessful third tour of America and a costly experiment in theatre management in 1883 depleted Soldene's funds, but she continued with success on tour. Now well into her 40s and 13 stone [182 pounds] in weight, Soldene was soon "forced... to abandon the sexy sophistications of opéra bouffe." Her first character role was in Frivoli at the Drury Lane Theatre, in 1886, together with Marie Tempest. She left this show when America's top musical manager, John McCaull, invited her there to star in comic opera, vaudeville, variety musicals, and, briefly on Broadway with his McCaull Comic Opera Company, as Oudarde in an adaptation of a French melodrama, Lorraine (1887).

Soldene wrote a play, Jeanne Fortier, the Bread Carrier, that premiered at Niblo's Garden on 10 June 1889. She then settled in San Francisco, where she played heavy ladies in comic opera from 1890 to 1892 at the Tivoli and the Orpheum theatres. In 1892, she played again for a season in Australia, but the trip was a financial disaster for her and completely depleted her funds.

=== Journalism career and last years ===
Left without employment, she was forced to seek a new career. A journalist who had admired Soldene obtained a job for her as music and drama critic for the Sydney Evening News. For the next seventeen years, she wrote weekly columns of lively London gossip for the Evening News and then The Sun and other publications. Soldene published one novel, Young Mrs. Staples (1896), and a scandalous memoir, the innocently-titled My Theatrical and Musical Recollections (1896). According to theatre historian Kurt Gänzl, this turned out to be the high-society literary sensation of the last years of the nineteenth century. Soldene named a long list of aristocratic and wealthy gentlemen who had had liaisons with young ladies in the theatre during her younger days.

Soldene had four children, one of whom became a comedian and dancer, Pip Powell. In 1906, a benefit was held for Soldene at the Palace Theatre.

She died of a heart attack at her lodgings in Bloomsbury at the age of 73 and is buried in the graveyard of Shirley Church, London.
