= Robert Burford =

Robert Burford may refer to:

- Robert Burford (painter) (1791–1861), English painter of panoramas
- Robert F. Burford (1923–1993), American politician
