= Robert Copeland (theatre manager) =

English Theatre Manager

- Born: 1765; Bampton, Oxfordshire, England
- Died: 17 April 1842 (aged 76–77); Kensington, London, England
- Occupation: Theatre manager
- Children: William (theatre manager), Mrs Fanny Fitzwilliam (actress), Mary, Thomas and Charlotte

Robert Copeland (1765-1842) was a theatre manager who managed the Dover theatre circuit in England in the early part of the 19th Century. The circuit initially included the theatres at Dover, Sandwich and Deal but in 1801 he added the Theatre Royal, Margate. Copeland was business like and practical and he managed to turn round the fading fortunes of the Theatre Royal. In Copeland's first season he hired the services of the distinguished actors Mrs Jordan and George Frederick Cooke. The season of 1803 saw the Theatre Royal, Margate requisitioned by the army to be used as auxiliary barracks. Copeland returned to manage the Theatre Royal 1811.

Through his descendants Copeland left quite a mark on British theatre. His daughter Fanny went on to become an actress. After marrying the actor Edward Fitzwilliam she performed as Mrs Fitzwilliam. His brother Benjamin's grand-daughter Isabella, also an actress, became the wife of the actor, playwright and theatre manager John Baldwin Buckstone. The Buckstone's went on to have children who became prominent actors both here and in the United States. His son William Robert Copeland followed in his father's footsteps by managing theatres in London and Liverpool.

Other stars of the stage such as Fay Compton and Vesta Tilley also married Copeland's descendants.
