= Grand Panorama of London from the Thames =

The Grand Panorama of London from the Thames is an 1844 wood engraving depicting the north bank of the Thames river in London (then the world's largest city) running from Western Stone Wharf by the unfinished Houses of Parliament (the tower to house Big Ben is not yet constructed) to the Belfast, Cork, Leith and Glasgow Steam Wharf, just east of St Katharine Docks; a distance of approximately ten miles. An illustration, based on the engraving, was published as four separate supplements (each sheet measuring 31 and a half inches by 42 and a half inches) to the Pictorial Times and when joined were approximately 12 feet in length.

== Background ==
Early-Victorian periodicals of the 1840s such as the Illustrated London News and Punch magazines used wood engravings to illustrate their stories. The Pictorial Times, founded in 1843 by Henry Vizetelly (1820–1894), with his elder brother James Thomas and Andrew Spottiswoode, was a rival to the Illustrated London News and presented the Grand Panorama of London from the Thames as a gift to its subscribers. The engraving was the brainchild of the Pictorial Times's editor, Henry Vizetelly, who was an artist and journalist and who had offered a similar gift whilst working with the Illustrated London News a few years previously. His own sketches of London would be pieced together to form engravings.

The Pictorial Times produced handbills in late 1844 announcing 'for all persons, the largest engraving in the world, the Grand Panorama of London from the Thames, fourteen feet in length!' The panorama appeared on 11 January 1845. Though 'Engraved by Henry Vizetelly' appeared on the panorama it is assumed that it was engraved at the Vizetelly establishment rather than by Henry Vizetelly himself.

== London of 1844 ==
London had undergone rapid expansion in the early nineteenth century and the 1841 Census showed a population of roughly two and a quarter million (it was to double again within 40 years). The Panorama starts with the public buildings in the west and finishes with the busy docks and wharves of the East End. In between are the spires of churches and statues, mixed with the industry of the city shown as the chimneys. The engraving shows the unfinished Hungerford Bridge (completed in 1845) and the original 1769 Blackfriars Bridge (replaced in 1869). Waterloo Bridge is shown as it was then a toll bridge. London Bridge is depicted with the lamp posts cast from cannon captured from the French during the Peninsular War.

Some of the major buildings appearing on the engraving that were later lost include Northumberland House (demolished to make way for Northumberland Avenue); Exeter Hall; and many of the churches have been replaced or lost including St Benet's, St Michael's and St Mary Magdalen's; Hungerford Market was lost and Charing Cross Station built on it.

== 1849 colour version ==
In 1849 an updated colourised version of the engraving was published by Whitelaw in London and was 6-inch by 18-foot-long and housed in 6 by 7 inch book. This went further east to the Isle of Dogs and covered the south bank of the Thames to the Royal Victualling Office at Deptford. This version made small changes to Hungerford Bridge which had been completed in 1845.

== See also ==
- Romantic-era panoramas
- Wyld's Great Globe
