= Lionel Benjamin Rayner =

18/19th century British actor (1788-1855)

Lionel Benjamin Rayner (10 October 1788 – 24 September 1855) was an English actor, usually playing rustic characters. As an actor-manager he opened in 1831 a short-lived theatre in the Strand, London.

== Life ==
Rayner was born in Heckmondwike in the West Riding of Yorkshire in 1788. His father, a farmer and cloth manufacturer, died before he was seven years old. After seeing, at Leeds, Charles Mathews as Farmer Ashfield in Thomas Morton's Speed the Plough, he ran away from home and joined a company at Cheadle, Staffordshire, where he opened as Jeremy Diddler in James Kenney's farce Raising the Wind. His manager played the light-comedy parts which Rayner wanted to play, so he left and joined, at a salary of three shillings weekly, a company in Stone, Staffordshire, where he stayed for three years. In Stratford-on-Avon, by his performance of Solomon Lob in Love laughs at Locksmiths, he raised his position and his salary. He appeared in Manchester as Robin Roughhead in John Till Allingham's Fortune's Frolic with success; and then, at a salary of thirty shillings, joined the Nottingham company. Here, where he rose in reputation, he was seen by John Bannister in Zekiel Homespun and Dr. Pangloss in The Heir at Law by George Colman the Younger, and was recommended by him to the manager of the Haymarket Theatre.

Having made the acquaintance and friendship of John Emery, to whose parts he succeeded, Rayner went to York, where he played rustics, sailors and similar parts. Stamford, Lynn, Louth, Manchester, Huntingdon, and other places were visited. His popularity was everywhere marked. Nevertheless, he was thinking of leaving the stage, when he received an offer from Robert William Elliston for Drury Lane. He appeared there in November 1822, playing Dandie Dinmont in Guy Mannering. At Drury Lane he seems to have played only this character, in which, in February 1823, he was replaced by Ralph Sherwin. Rayner then joined the Lyceum, where he appeared in July 1823 as Fixture in Thomas Morton's A Roland for an Oliver, and subsequently played Giles in The Miller's Maid. in a manner that secured for him offers from Drury Lane and Covent Garden Theatre.

=== Covent Garden ===
At Covent Garden, under Charles Kemble, he made what was announced as his first appearance there, in October 1823, as Tyke in Thomas Morton's The School of Reform. His engagement was for three years at a salary rising from £10 to £12 per week. Later that month he was seen as Robin Roughhead in Fortune's Frolic. Sam Sharpset in The Slave, Fixture, and Pan in Midas followed, and he had an original part in an unprinted drama in two acts, The Ferry of the Guiers. In the following season his name was rarely in the bills. He was seen, however, in June 1825 as Friar Tuck in Ivanhoe, and later that month as Caliban. During his third season he can only be traced in Dandie Dinmont, Zekiel Homespun, and in Rolamo in Clari, which he played for his benefit.

=== "Rayner's New Subscription Theatre" ===
In 1831 he took the site of Burford's Panorama, and erected there a house known as Rayner's New Subscription Theatre in the Strand. Two burlettas, Professionals Puzzled by William Leman Rede, and Mystification, were produced, and Rayner appeared as Giles in The Miller's Maid; Harriet Waylett became his leading actress. Bayle Bernard brought out for her his Four Sisters, Madame Céleste appeared in a drama called Alp the Brigand. Leman Rede wrote for the theatre The Loves of the Angels and The Loves of the Devils, which were played by a company including Miss M. Glover, Charles Selby and William Henry Oxberry.

However, the theatre closed in November 1831 for want of patronage, because of the absence of the Lord Chamberlain's license and the opposition of the patent theatres. Rayner went into the country, and obtained a great success as Lubin in Love's Frailties; or, Passion and Repentance, written for him by J. J. Stafford to show off his abilities.

He made further attempts, all unsuccessful, to open the Strand with a magistrate's license and with non-dramatic pieces. His persistence in pointing out that, while theatres on the south side of the Thames could be opened, those on the north side could not, helped to form public opinion on the subject; and in 1836 a license was granted. It was too late to be of service to Rayner, who retired from his long fight practically ruined, and began writing for racing papers and magazines. During his stay at Covent Garden he had become a subscriber to the Covent Garden fund; on attaining his sixtieth year he claimed a pension, and on this and some aid from his pen he lived, contracting a second marriage and administering to the needs of others in the profession poorer than himself. He died on 24 September 1855, and was buried in the old burial-ground, Camberwell, near his only son. He had, in 1812, married, at Shrewsbury, Margaret Remington, daughter of the prompter of the York circuit, and had by her a son.

== His character ==
Joseph Knight wrote: "Rayner was a good serio-comic actor. His countrymen, though good, were not equal to those of John Emery, whom, however, he surpassed as Giles in The Miller's Maid. Job Thornberry, in George Colman the Younger's John Bull, represents the line in which he was seen to the most advantage. His Penruddock, in Richard Cumberland's The Wheel of Fortune, was compared, not to his disadvantage, with that of Kemble. It wanted dignity, but exhibited something higher and more beautiful—the picture of a heartbroken miserable misanthrope. In private life Rayner's character stood high. He was indefatigable in work and always conciliatory. When a house for his benefit was full, and a crowd outside was clamorous, he came and spoke to those assembled, asking what he could do for them. 'Sing us a song, Rayner,' was the reply, 'and we'll go quietly home.' Rayner mounted a tub, and, with the accompaniment of one violin, sang a song, receiving in response hearty cheers."

Rayner was five feet eight in height, stoutly made, dark in complexion, with hazel eyes and a certain appearance of rusticity. He was a sporting man, a member of Tattersalls, and, while in the country, a follower of the hounds.
