= William Robert Copeland =

English theatre manager (1799–1867)

William Robert Copeland (1799–1867) was an English theatre manager. He was born in Deal, Kent, the son of Robert Copeland who managed the Dover theatre circuit. His sister Fanny became the noted actress Fanny Fitzwilliam. In his early years he was apprenticed to a chemist.

During his career in the theatre he became the lessee and manager of the Theatre Royal, Liverpool and proprietor of the Royal Amphitheatre, Liverpool (1843). He also managed the Strand Theatre, London, which he called "Punch's Playhouse", from May 1851 to May 1852.

Copeland married Douglas Jerrold's sister Elizabeth Sarah Lambe Jerrold and the couple had at least 6 children.

Copeland died on 29 May 1867 aged 68. He was buried at Smithdown Lane Cemetery, Liverpool on 8 June 1867.

== Related links ==
- Liverpool's Old Theatres
