= Kathleen Fitzwilliam =

English actress and singer

- From Planche's Extravaganzas Vol III
- Born: Kathleen Mary Fitzwilliam; 13 November 1826; Covent Garden, London, England
- Died: 6 January 1894 (aged 67); 21 Edith Road, West Kensington, London, W14 0SU
- Occupations: Actress, Singer
- Years active: 1845–1854
- Spouse: Charles Edward Withall (m. 1854; Until his death. 1886)
- Children: 4
- Relatives: Edward Fitzwilliam (father); Fanny Fitzwilliam (mother); Edward Francis Fitzwilliam (brother)

Kathleen Mary Fitzwilliam (1826–1894) was an English actress and singer appearing regularly on the London stage in the mid 19th century.

== Early life ==
Kathleen Fitzwilliam was born in Covent Garden, England, the daughter of the noted actors Edward Fitzwilliam and Fanny Fitzwilliam. Her parents were both of Irish descent.

She attended the Convent in Hammersmith as a boarder.

== Musical education ==
She studied under John Barnett (singing), John Liptrot Hatton (piano) and Balzir Chatterton (harp). Her first appearance in public was on 15 March 1845 at the Hanover Square Rooms as a singer on the occasion of the first performance of an original 'Stabat Mater' composed by her brother Edward Francis Fitzwilliam. In the same year she made her stage debut at the Theatre Royal, Birmingham as Rosina in The Barber of Seville.

== Career ==
Fitzwilliam's first appearance on the London stage was on 1 December 1847 at the Lyceum Theatre where she played the title role in Peggy Green which was written expressly for her by Charles Selby. She remained at the Lyceum for three seasons appearing in James Planché's extravaganzas.

Miss Fitzwilliam appeared with many notable Victorian actors. She played Ophelia with William Macready in Hamlet and appeared as Maud in The Wife's Secret with Mr and Mrs Charles Kean. On the return of Miss Fanny Kemble from America, Miss Fitzwilliam played Helen in The Hunchback in Liverpool (1847) to Miss Kemble's Julia.

In 1849 she performed for Queen Victoria at Windsor Castle in the Christmas theatricals. In 1850 (January) Miss Fitzwilliam joined the company of the Theatre Royal Haymarket, under Mr. Benjamin Webster's management, and shortly afterwards transferred her services to the Adelphi Theatre, where she remained for three seasons.

== Retirement ==
Miss Fitzwilliam made her last appearance on the stage in August 1852 in Bon Soir, Signor Pantalon at the Adelphi Theatre, and then adopted concert singing as a profession. From 1852 until early 1854 she sang with much success at most of the concerts and musical reunions in London and at several in the principal towns of the provinces. In May 1854 she married and left the profession.

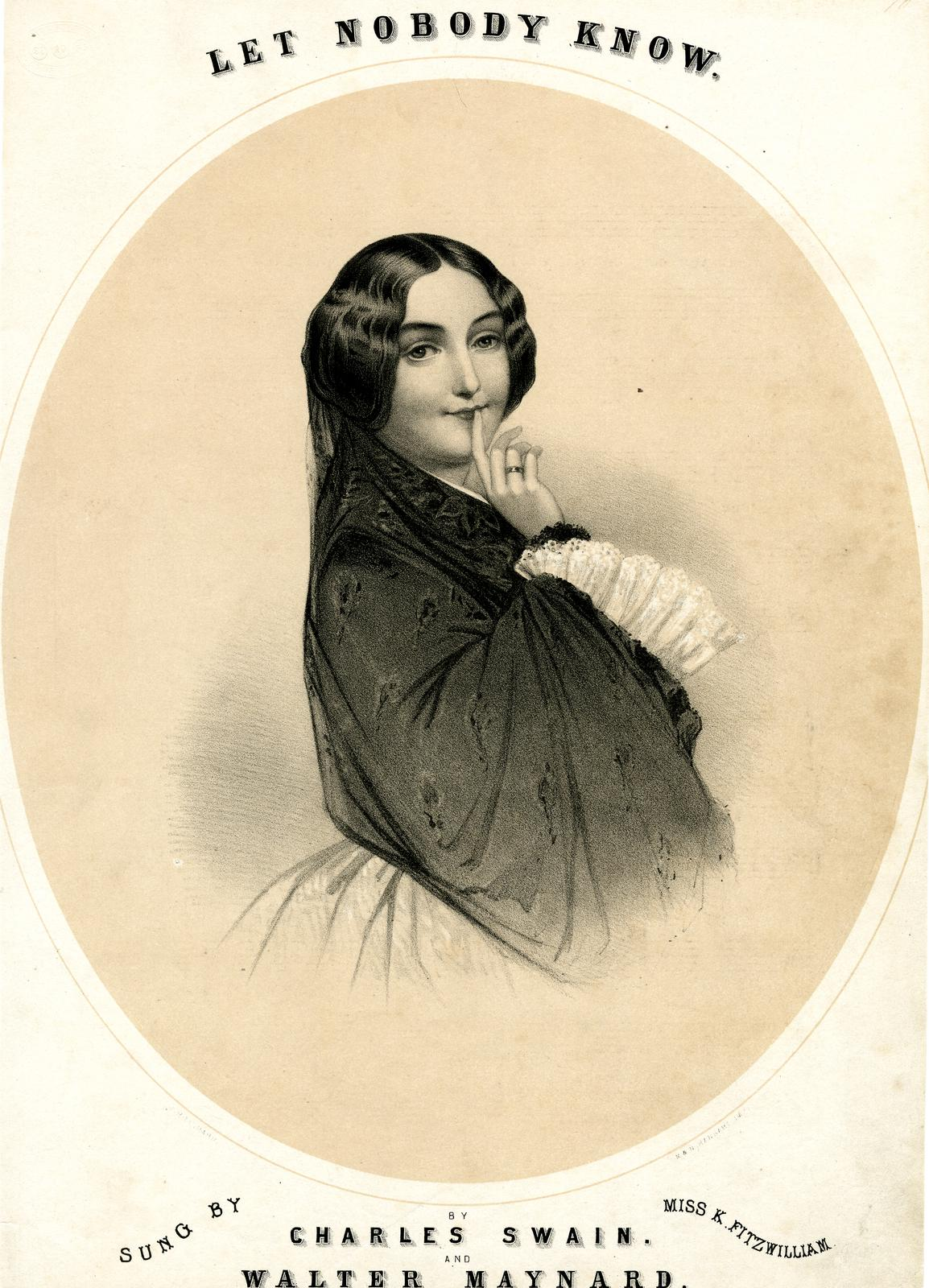

T'Was on a Sunday Morning

== Notable parts – London ==
=== Lyceum Theatre, London ===
- Margaret Honeyball in 'Anything for a Change' by Shirley Brooks
- Anne Page in 'The Merry Wives of Windsor'
- Polly Peachum in a revival of 'The Beggar's Opera'. 15 June 1848 with Madame Vestris

==== Planché's Extravaganzas at the Lyceum ====
- Prince Humpy in The Golden Branch
- Prince Florizel in The King of the Peacocks
- Ariadne in Theseus and Ariadne
- St George in The Seven Champions of Christendom

=== Theatre Royal, Drury Lane ===
- Polly Peachum – 'The Beggar's Opera' July 1849 with Madame Vestris and Sims Reeves for the benefit of James Kenney (dramatist) who died the same evening.

=== Theatre Royal Haymarket ===
- Several performances under Mr. Benjamin Webster's management

=== Adelphi Theatre ===
- Three seasons, playing original parts in
- Columbine in Good Night, Signor Pantalon (23 Sep 1851 – 2 Jun 1852)
- Fiametta in Mephistopheles; or, An Ambassador from Below! (14 Apr 1852 – 31 Jul 1852)
- Giralda in Giralda; or, The Miller's Wife (23 Sep 1851 – 1 Oct 1851)
- Laurette Seymour in My Little Adopted (2 June 1852)
- Mary Thorncliffe in Sea and Land (17 May 1852 – 10 Jul 1852)
- Mrs. Bounce in Bloomerism; or, The Follies of the Day (2 Oct 1851 – 23 Dec 1851)
- Trudchen in Little Red Riding Hood (26 Dec 1851 – 20 Mar 1852)
- Esmeralda
- Jessie Gray
- The Tarantula

=== Windsor Castle Theatricals 1849 ===
- Endiga in 'Charles The Twelfth' singing 'Rise Gentle Moon' in the Rubens' Room
  - The Queen, through Mr Charles Kean, sent a message to the actress, saying how pleased Her Majesty had been with the song, and expressing appreciation of " the admirable way in which Miss Fitzwilliam had accomplished, what must have been, a very difficult task."

== Notable parts – Provinces ==
- Ophelia in Hamlet with William Macready
- Maud in The Wife's Secret with Mr and Mrs Charles Kean
- Helen to Fanny Kemble's Julia in The Hunchback in Liverpool.
- Several important pieces with Miss Cushman
