= C. J. Phipps =

English architect

C. J. Phipps FSA
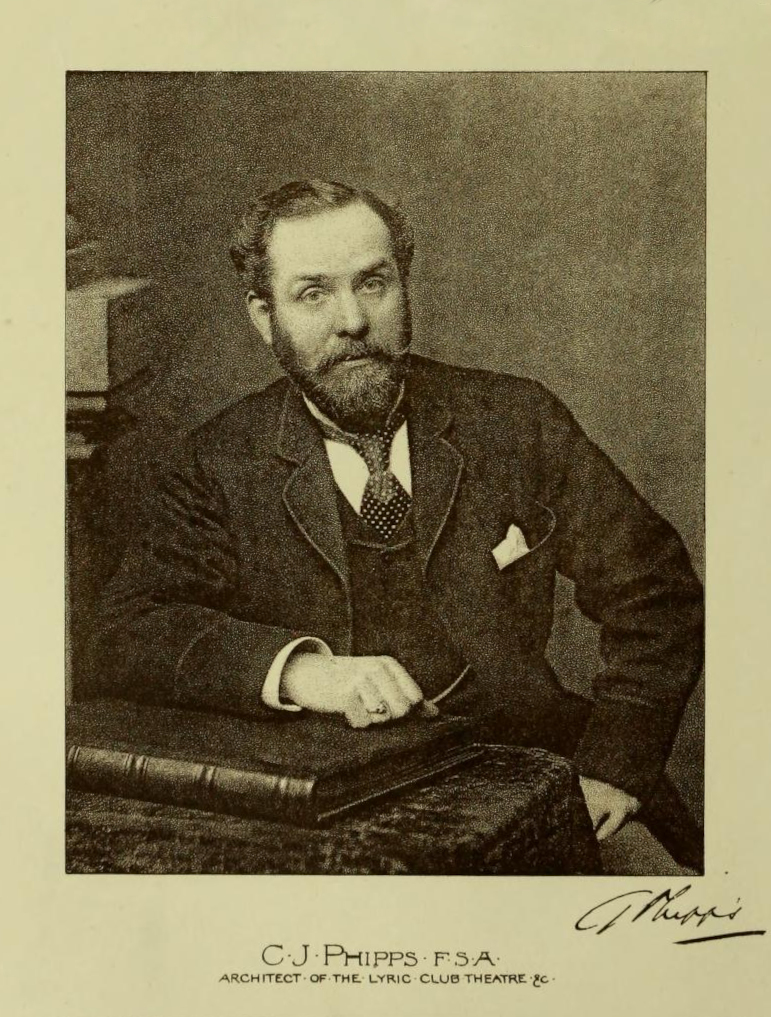
- Phipps, c. 1890
- Born: 25 March 1835; Lansdowne, Bath, England
- Died: 25 May 1897 (aged 62); London, England
- Occupation: Architect
- Known for: Savoy Theatre, Gaiety Theatre
- Spouse: Honor Hicks (m. 1860)

Charles John Phipps FSA (25 March 1835 – 25 May 1897) was an English architect known for more than forty theatres he designed in the latter half of the nineteenth century.

He began his own practice in his native Bath in 1857, designing buildings and furniture in the Gothic Revival style. In 1862 he gained his first theatre commission, the Theatre Royal, Bath, which generally retained the Georgian character of the original theatre on the site. He moved to London in 1868, where he designed a variety of non-theatrical buildings, including the Royal Institute of British Architects’ own premises.

Four of his West End theatres survive: the Vaudeville, the Lyric, the Garrick and Her (now His) Majesty's. Eight others have been rebuilt in the twentieth century (including the Savoy and Sadler's Wells) or demolished (including the Gaiety and Daly's).

In the British provinces Phipps's theatres have fared better, with the prominent exception of the Theatre Royal, Exeter, which burned down in 1887 with large loss of life. Nine others have been destroyed by fire or bombs, rebuilt or demolished, but nine have survived, including the Theatres Royal at Bath, Brighton, Glasgow and Nottingham and theatres in Aberdeen, Eastbourne, Edinburgh, Northampton and Wolverhampton. Of his surviving theatres, all but one are Listed buildings – officially designated as of particular architectural or historic interest deserving special protection.

== Life and career ==
=== Early years ===
Phipps was born in Lansdown, Bath in Somerset, the eldest of the three children of John Rashleigh Phipps and his second wife, Elizabeth Ruth née Neate. He was educated at St Catherine's Hermitage, Bath, and then articled to an architectural practice in the city, Fuller and Wilson. (Note: Phipps's contemporary Paul Waterhouse in the Dictionary of National Biography calls the partnership Wilcox & Fuller, but the name of Fuller’s partner is confirmed elsewhere.)

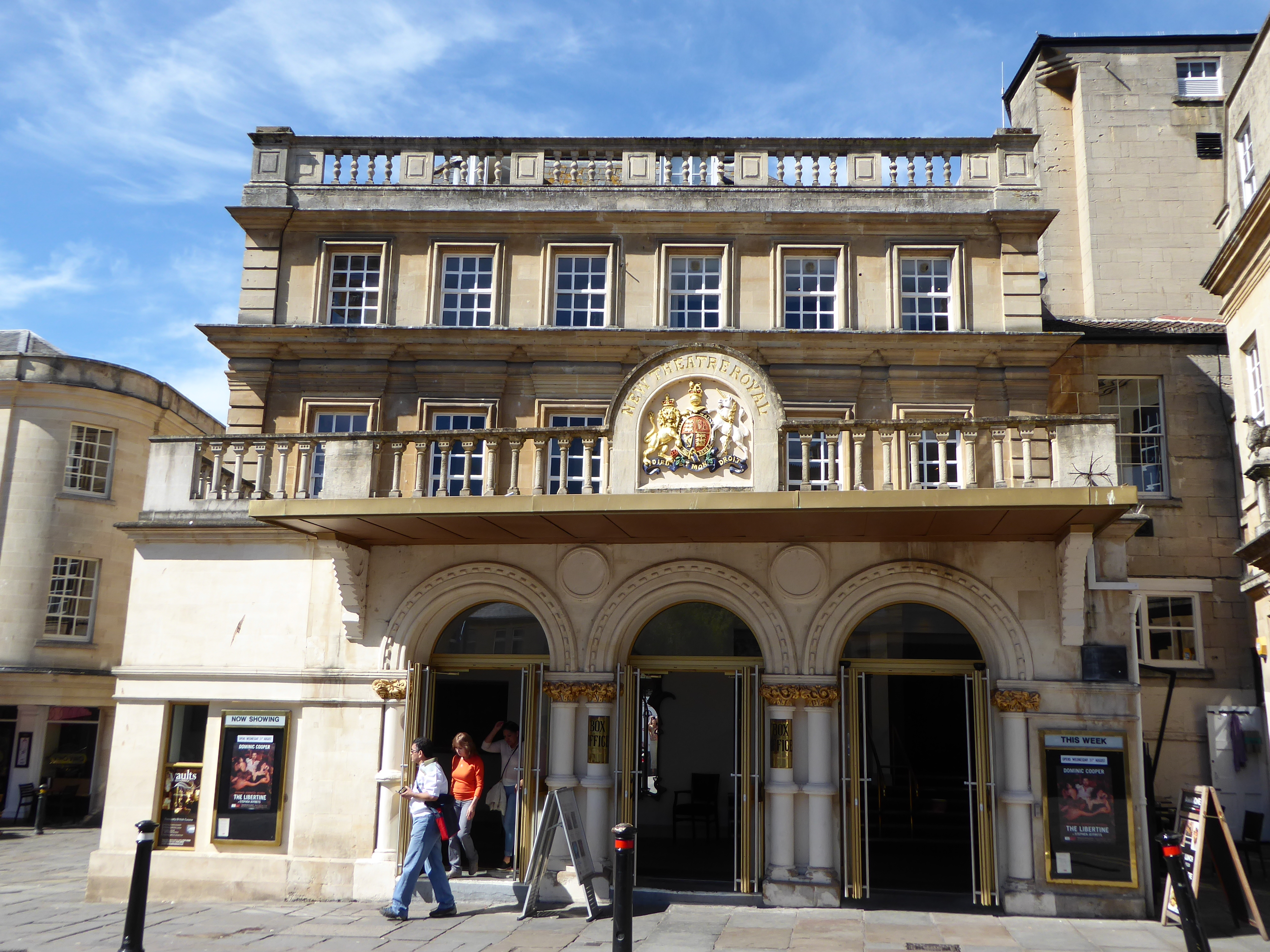
Theatre Royal, Bath, 1863 (2016 photograph)

After a sketching tour on the Continent, Phipps established his own practice in Bath in 1857, producing designs for buildings and furniture in the Gothic Revival style of George Godwin and William Burges. In 1860 he married Honor Hicks of Enborne, Berkshire; they had five children, born between 1860 and 1872, four of whom survived into adulthood.

In 1862 Phipps gained his first theatre commission – a replacement of the old Theatre Royal, Bath, which had been gutted by fire. He came first in a competition to rebuild the theatre, and created the new house around the shell of the old, making use of the walls that remained, and generally retaining the Georgian character of George Dance the Younger's original building. As a 1901 biographer put it, this "marked the direction of a future career, at variance both with the wishes of his parents, who disapproved of theatres, and with his training, which was Gothic and ecclesiastical".

=== London ===
Phipps and his family moved to London in 1868, living at 26 Mecklenburgh Square in Bloomsbury, which he made his office as well as his home. He designed some non-theatrical buildings, including a substantial reconstruction of the Devonshire Club in St James's, the new Carlton Hotel in the Haymarket, the 100-room Lyric Club near Leicester Square, flats in Shaftesbury Avenue, business premises in the Strand, Ludgate Hill and Moorgate, the Savoy Turkish Baths and the militia barracks in Bath.

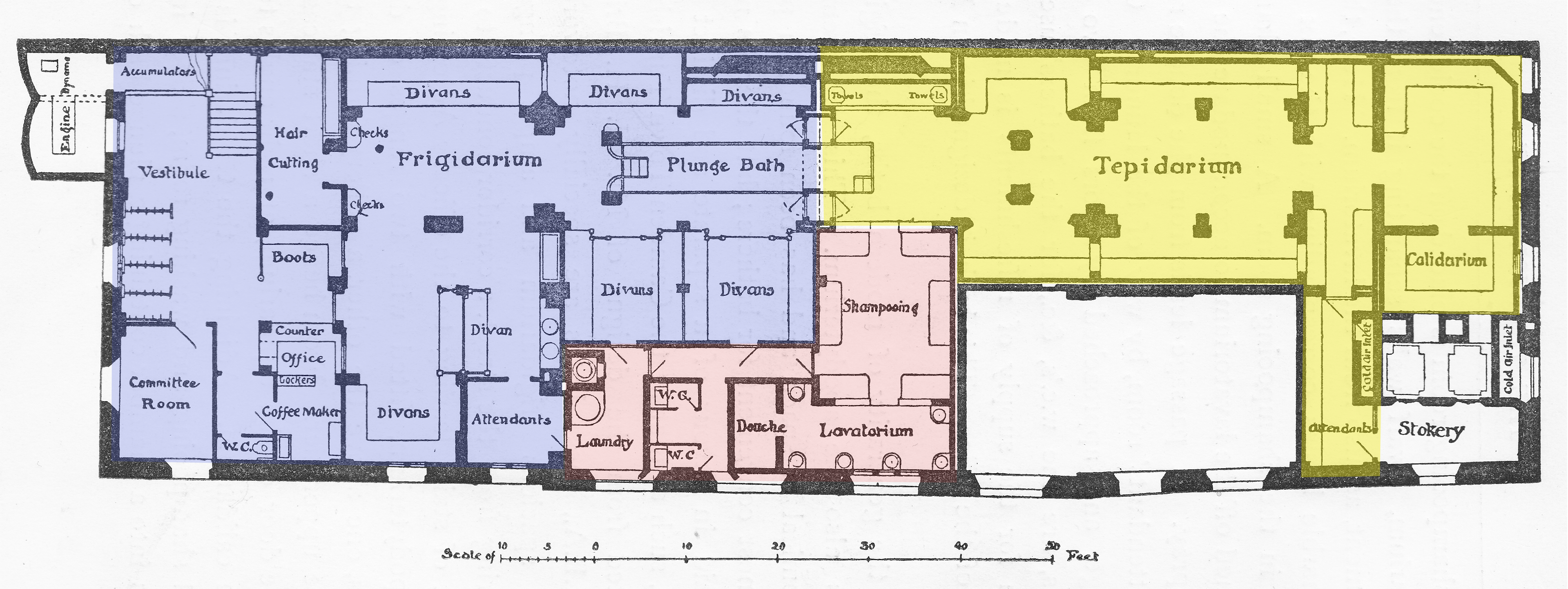
The Savoy Victorian Turkish baths

Other non-theatre designs included Leinster Hall in Dublin for Michael Gunn (opened in 1886 and replaced in 1897), the Star and Garter Hotel at Richmond (demolished in 1919) and the Savoy Victorian Turkish baths, the first in London to be lit by electricity. Phipps was chosen to design the Royal Institute of British Architects’ own premises at 9 Conduit Street. The building is still there, although no longer occupied by the institute. Nonetheless it was as a theatre architect that he became best known.

=== Theatres ===
Phipps more often designed theatres for straight drama, rather than music halls – the latter boomed later in the century and became associated with younger architects including Frank Matcham and W. G. R. Sprague. Phipps's style was influenced by the great French theatres of the eighteenth and mid-nineteenth centuries, with, as a 1982 study puts it, "a solemn, seemingly solid dignity". The decoration of his interiors was restrained, unlike "the integrated high-key rumbustiousness of the later Matcham or Crewe theatres". A similar classical restraint was evident in the exterior of most of his buildings.

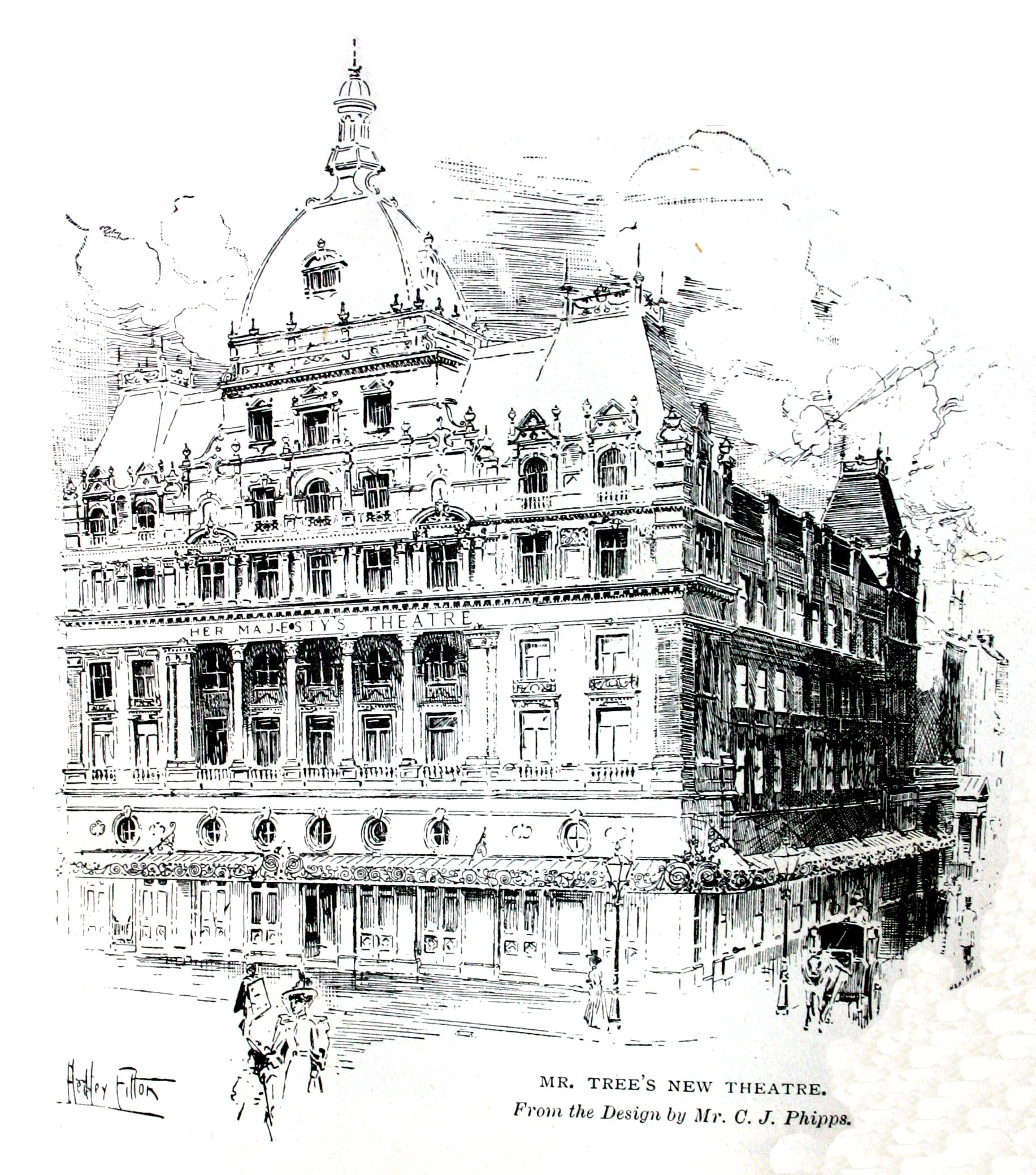
Phipps's Her Majesty's Theatre (1897)

Phipps established himself as the leading theatrical architect, designing, in rapid succession, the Queen's (1867), the Gaiety (1868), the Olympic (1870) and the Vaudeville (1871). His West End theatres of the 1880s included the Savoy Theatre (1881), the Strand (1882), the Prince's (1884), the Lyric (1888), the original Shaftesbury Theatre (1888) and the Garrick (1889). His London theatres of the 1890s were the Tivoli (1890), Daly's (1893) and Her Majesty's Theatre (1897).

In addition to Phipps's London theatres, he was responsible for many more in the provinces, including as far north as Aberdeen and as far west as Dublin. Eight have survived including the Theatres Royal at Bath, Brighton, Glasgow and Nottingham and theatres in Aberdeen, Eastbourne, Edinburgh and Northampton. Of his surviving theatres, all but one are Listed buildings – officially designated by the Historic Buildings and Monuments Commission for England or Historic Environment Scotland as of particular architectural or historic interest deserving special protection.

=== Blame for deaths at Exeter fire ===
Phipps designed the Theatre Royal, Exeter, which opened in 1886. In 1887, during a performance, a gauze curtain caught fire from a gas lamp lighting the stage. The resulting fire claimed the lives of 186 visitors and remains the worst theatre-related disaster, and third most deadly fire in UK history. There were two inquiries into the disaster, both of which placed significant blame on Phipps:

A coroner's inquest was opened on 21 September 1887 before a coroner's jury. The magistrates who issued the premises licence had noted only a single exit from the gallery (where the majority of the deaths occurred) where there should have been two, but Phipps persuaded them that people climbing the railing at the front of the balcony and dropping to the Upper Circle below was a suitable and effective second exit. The verdict was of accidental death, but the coroner's jury found that the magistrates had been misled by Phipps and suggested that a licence should never have been issued. The coroner's jury noted that a safety curtain and fire hydrant were specified in the theatre's plans, but had not yet been installed in the building. They also criticised the lack of ceiling height above the gallery, which gave people less time to escape before being overcome by smoke.

A separate parliamentary inquiry was carried out by Captain Eyre Massey Shaw, the Chief Officer of the Metropolitan Fire Brigade. Shaw's report was also critical of Phipps and his design. Phipps attended the inquest and was "vigorous" and "sarcastic" in his defence of his work, pointing out that a number of elements in his plans had been changed or ignored during construction. The jury in this case also returned a verdict of accidental death. Ultimately, Shaw was able to use the results of the fire to bring about stricter theatre regulations, including the requirement for a safety curtain.

=== Death ===
Phipps died on 25 May 1897, aged 62, and is buried in a family grave on the east side of Highgate Cemetery.

== Theatres by Phipps ==
In London except where indicated

Date	Theatre	Notes
1863	Theatre Royal, Bath	Listed, Grade II*
1865	Theatre Royal, Nottingham	Listed, Grade II
1865	Theatre Royal, South Shields	Only the façade remaining, which is Listed, Grade II
1866	Theatre Royal, Brighton	Listed, Grade II*
1867	Prince's Theatre, Bristol	Destroyed by bombing, 1940
1867	Royal, Swansea	Demolished
1867	Queen's, Long Acre	Demolished
1868	Gaiety	Demolished
1870	Olympic	Demolished
1870	Varieties Music Hall, Hoxton	Demolished
1871	Gaiety, Dublin	Demolished
1871	Vaudeville	Listed, Grade II
1872	Tivoli, Aberdeen	With James Matthews. Listed, Category A
1873	Theatre Royal, Edinburgh	Destroyed by fire, 1947
1875	Theatre Royal, Worcester	Demolished
1877	Opera House, Leicester	Demolished
1877	Royal Opera House, Derry	Demolished
1878	Rotunda Theatre, Liverpool	With E. Davis & Sons; destroyed by bombing, 1940
1879	Sadler's Wells	Completely rebuilt in 1931
1880	Theatre Royal, Glasgow	Burnt down and rebuilt in 1895). The largest surviving example of Phipps's work. Listed, Category A
1881	Savoy	Rebuilt 1929
1881	Theatre Royal, Belfast	Demolished
1882	Royal Strand	Demolished
1882	Gaiety Theatre, Hastings	With Cross and Wells; now a cinema
1882	Opera House, Leamington	With Osborne and Reading; demolished
1883	Hippodrome, Eastbourne (originally Theatre Royal and Opera House)	Listed, Grade II
1883	Royal Lyceum, Edinburgh	Listed, Category A
1884	Prince's Theatre, also known as the Prince of Wales Theatre	Demolished
1884	Royal, Northampton	Listed, Grade II
1884	Theatre Royal, Portsmouth	Rebuilt by Matcham, 1900
1886	Theatre Royal, Exeter	Burnt down in the same year
1887	Theatre Royal, Darlington	Demolished
1888	Lyric	Listed, Grade II
1888	Original Shaftesbury Theatre	Demolished
1889	Garrick	With Walter Emden. Listed, Grade II*
1890	Tivoli Theatre of Varieties	Demolished
1893	Daly's	Demolished
1893	Queen's Hall	Preliminary designs only; hall destroyed by bombing, 1941
1894	Grand, Wolverhampton	Listed, Grade II
1895	Toole's	Planned but not built
1897	His Majesty's	Listed, Grade II*

Source: Mackintosh and Sell; and Theatres Trust Database.

== Notes, references and sources ==
=== Sources ===
- Lowndes, William (1982). The Theatre Royal at Bath: The Eventful Story of a Georgian Playhouse. Bristol: Redcliffe. ISBN 0-90-545949-0.
- Mackintosh, Iain; Michael Sell, eds. (1982). Curtains!!!, or, A New Life for Old Theatres. Eastbourne: John Offord. ISBN 0-90-393142-7.
- Shifrin, Malcolm (2015). Victorian Turkish Baths. Swindon: Historic England. ISBN 1-84-802230-1.
