= Love's Frailties; or, Passion and Repentance =

1827 play

- Original language: English
- Written by: John J. Stafford
- Genre: Melodrama
- Setting: Yorkshire, London

Premiere
- Place: England

Love's Frailties; or Passion and Repentance is an 1827 seduction drama by English playwright John J. Stafford. The play was sometimes performed under the title The Cottager's Daughter.

The part of Lubin was written for Lionel Benjamin Raynor. In a foreword to the 1834 edition of his play, Stafford attributed much of the play's success to Raynor's performance.

== Plot ==
The low-born Susan Greenwell, a cottager's daughter, runs away to London with the well to-do Squire Belgrade, leaving the provincial Yorkshire village in which she was born and raised. Her brother, Lubin, resolves to find her and bring her back to the village. Squire Belgrade installs Susan in his London apartments. While Susan believes that she is married to Belgrade, the latter reveals that he staged their wedding, as he believes his father would never approve of a union between them. Upon this discovery, Susan goes insane. Lubin finds her and takes her back to their native village. Squire Belgrade decides to marry Susan, restoring her to sanity.

== Reception ==
The Morning Chronicle praised an 1832 production of the play, particularly the cast's performances.

The play made its Edinburgh debut on March 14, 1850, at the Theatre Royal, Edinburgh. The production's opening night received a positive review in Glasgow Daily Mail.

== Scholarship ==
In her scholarly work, Acts of Desire: Women and Sex on the English Stage 1800- 1930, Sos Eltis uses Stafford's play as a means of illustrating the conventions of seduction drama.
