= New Theatre Royal =

Theatre in Portsmouth, England

Theatre Royal
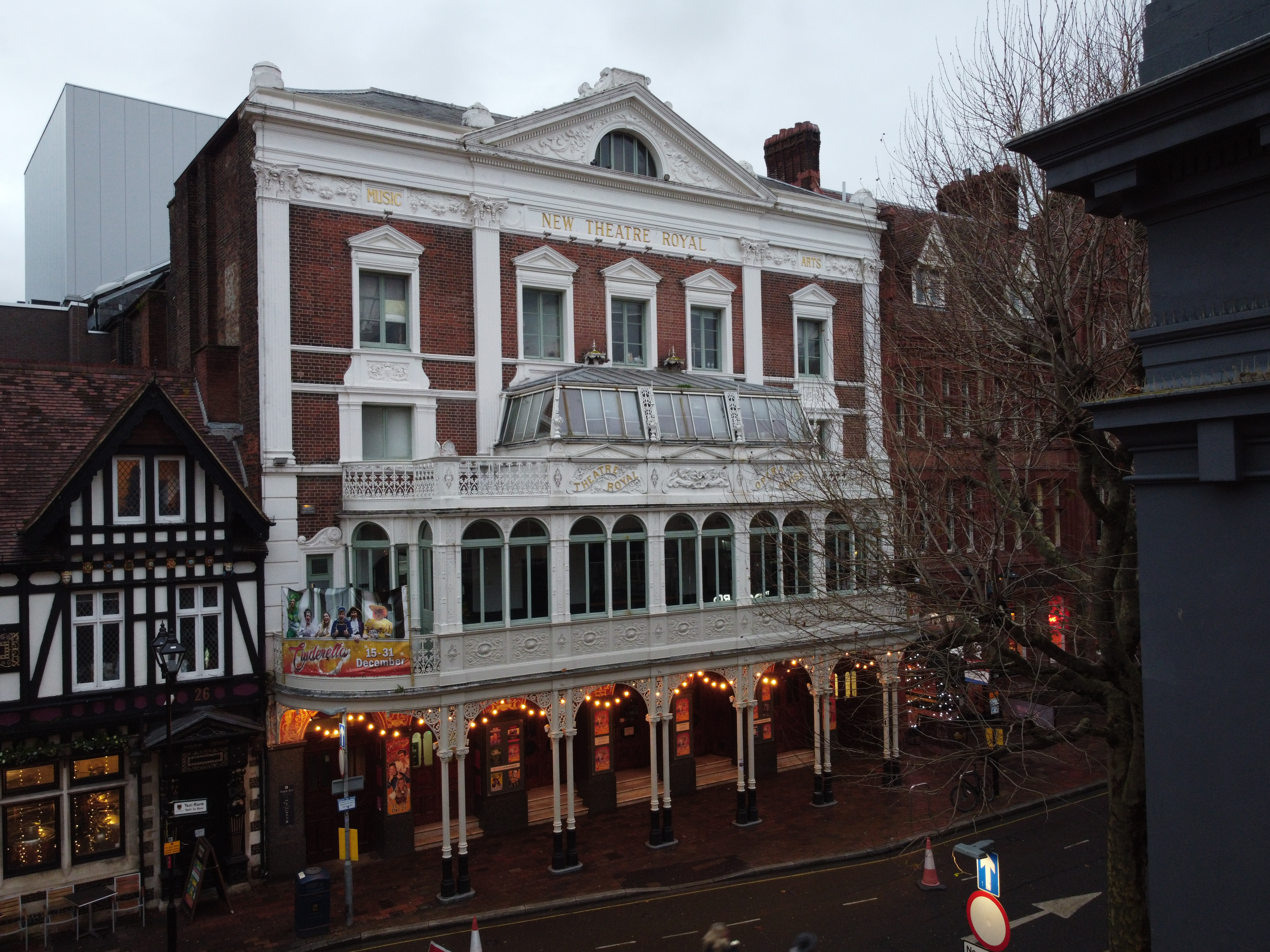
- Theatre Royal facade
- Interactive map of Theatre Royal
- Address: 20–24 Guildhall Walk; Portsmouth; England
- Coordinates: 50.7965°N 1.0932°W
- Owner: New Theatre Royal (Portsmouth) Trustees Ltd
- Capacity: 500
- Type: Visiting productions / Receiving house
- Designation: Grade II*
- Current use: Theatre

Construction
- Opened: 1884
- Renovated: 1900, 1970s, 2004 and 2012-15
- Reopened: 1900, 1976, 2004, 2015
- Years active: 1884–present
- Architects: Charles J. Phipps (1884); Frank Matcham (1900)

Website
- www.newtheatreroyal.com

The Theatre Royal, Portsmouth, is a Victorian Grade II* listed theatre in the heart of Portsmouth, England, with a capacity of 500. The theatre building was constructed in 1854 as Landport Hall. It was converted to a theatre two years later. It was rebuilt in 1884 by Charles J. Phipps and again in 1900 by Frank Matcham.

The Theatre reopened in October 2015 after a £4.7M refurbishment project.

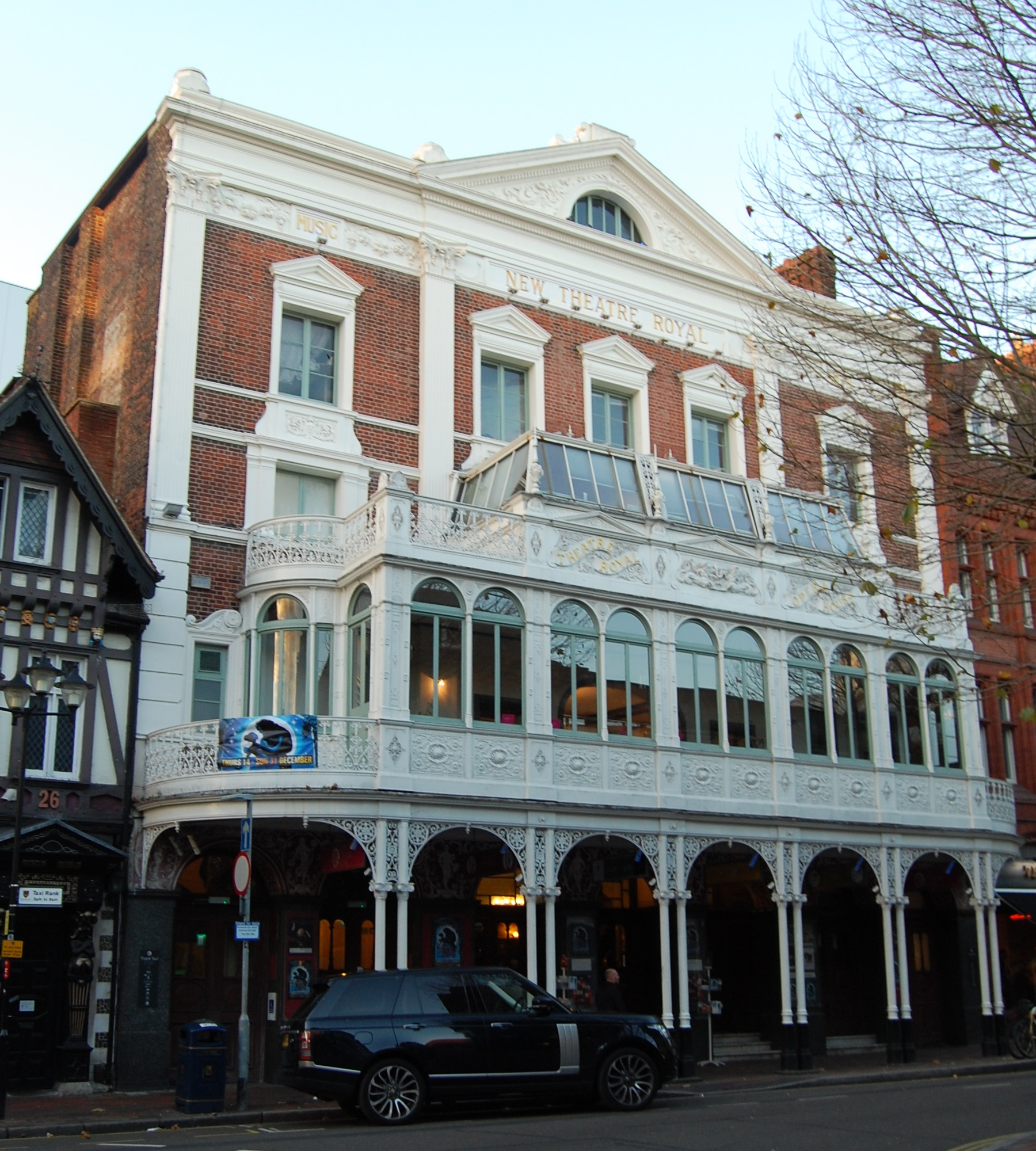
New Theatre Royal

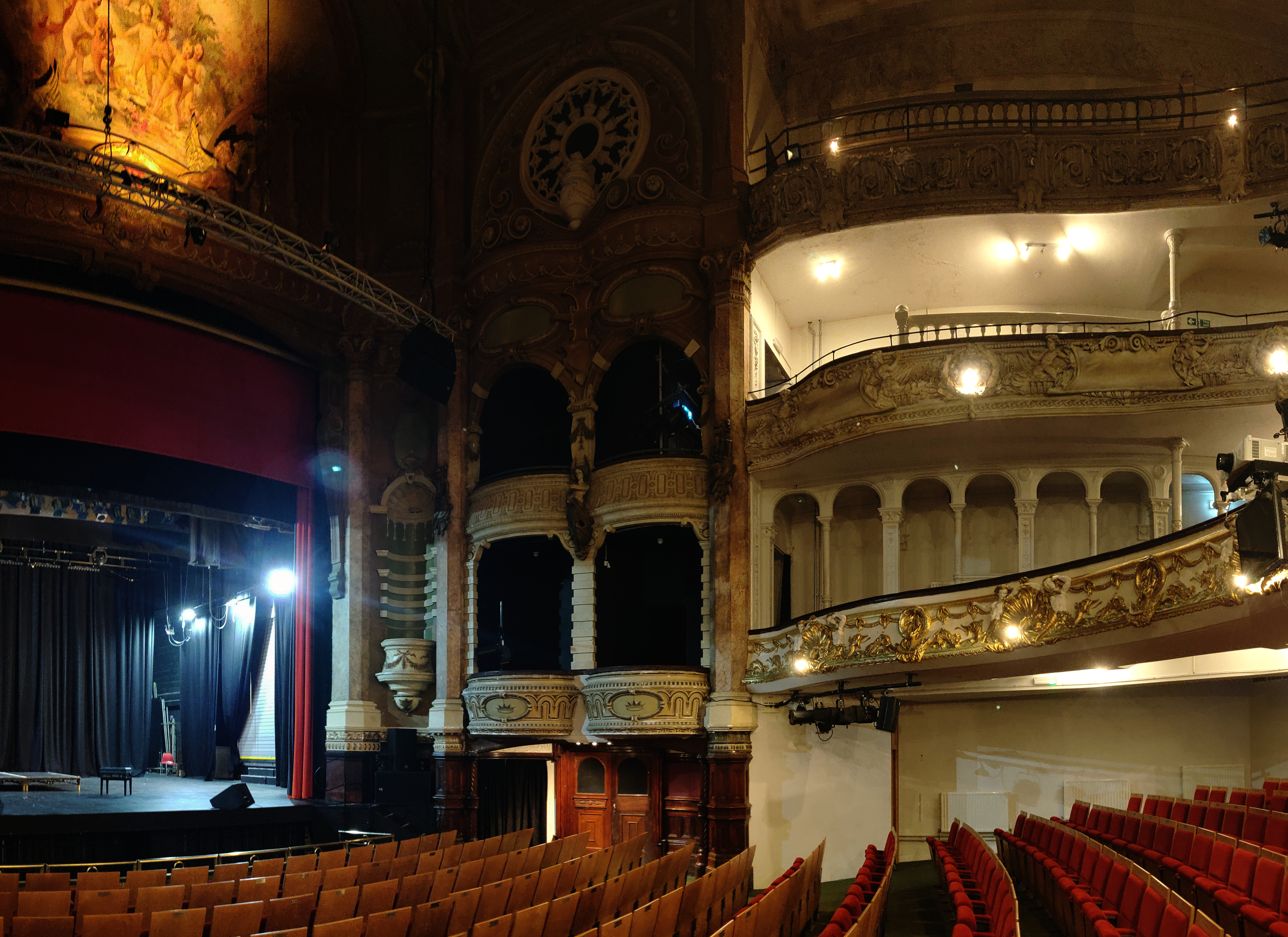
Auditorium

== History ==
=== Dickens and early theatre in Portsmouth ===
The present site was built to replace a theatre located in the High Street (now designated Old Portsmouth). The theatre features in Charles Dickens' novel Nicholas Nickleby. A popular music hall, it hosted performances by Niccolò Paganini and Franz Liszt and Mr Kean the leading actor manager of the early nineteenth century. It closed in 1854 and was demolished in 1856 with a number of other buildings to allow for the construction of a military establishment, the Cambridge Barracks. This building now houses Portsmouth Grammar School, a fee paying independent school. The three-arch entrance to the school occupies the location of the theatre. The city archives contain an 1824 poster/playbill of a performance of The Merchant of Venice starring Kean and paintings of the exterior and interior of the theatre. These show the theatre to have been a low building with no windows and a door with a Grecian portico typical of larger houses of the era. The interior was rectangular with two tiers of boxes along each wall and standing in the pit. It would have had a smaller audience capacity than the theatre which replaced it. The illustration of the Portsmouth Theatre by Phiz in Nicholas Nickleby is true to reality though not to scale.

Extract from Nicholas Nickleby Chapter XXIII

"They groped their way through a dark passage, and, descending a step or two, threaded a little maze of canvas screens and paintpots, and emerged upon the stage of the Portsmouth Theatre. 'Here we are,' said Mr Crummles. It was not very light, but Nicholas found himself close to the first entrance on the prompt side, among bare walls, dusty scenes, mildewed clouds, heavily daubed draperies, and dirty floors. He looked about him; ceiling, pit, boxes, gallery, orchestra, fittings, and decorations of every kind,--all looked coarse, cold, gloomy, and wretched. 'Is this a theatre?' whispered Smike, in amazement; 'I thought it was a blaze of light and finery.' 'Why, so it is,' replied Nicholas, hardly less surprised; 'but not by day, Smike—not by day.' "

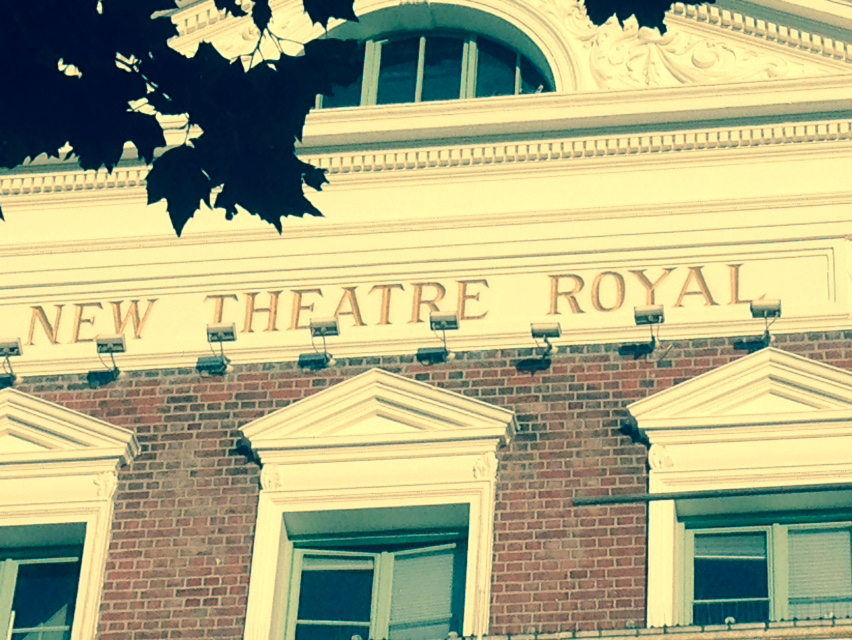
Newly painted

Nicholas Nickleby Charles Dickens, 1838–39

==== Did Dickens perform at the Portsmouth Theatre? ====
Dickens was born in Portsmouth and visited the theatre in 1838 to research for Nicholas Nickleby. He was not only a brilliant writer but a consummate performer and would-be actor. His readings were legendary and made him a 19th-century celebrity. There is a belief that he may have performed at the Portsmouth Theatre but this is unlikely. His descriptions in Nicholas Nickleby show that in addition to the auditorium he visited the stage and back stage but his career as a public performer began some ten years into his literary success and long after its publication. He is known to have performed in Portsmouth later but at St Peter's Hall; he did not perform at the current theatre and there is no evidence of his visiting it though it is possible.

=== Henry Rutley and the Portsmouth Theatres Company ===
In the same year the old theatre was demolished, Mr Henry Rutley opened a new venue on the present site. Rutley (born Newcastle 1816) was an impresario and circus proprietor who had arrived in Portsmouth in 1854 and purchased the Swan Tavern in Commercial Road and the adjoining Landport Hall, a racquet court. He converted the hall to accommodate equestrian displays and applied to the magistrates for permission to construct a new theatre on the site. The magistrates, believing theatres places of ill-repute, granted a licence for a limited period with the condition that there was no direct access from the tavern. A door to the hall, bricked in during building, was temporarily uncovered during renovation work in 2004. The Theatre Royal opened on 29 September 1856 with a production entitled A New Way to Pay Old Debts. Rutley managed the venue with J W Boughton as his assistant and was highly successful. In a typical week the theatre would host two plays a night with matinees at the weekend. Rutley died of 'dropsy' in 1874. His grave can be seen in Highland Road Cemetery in Southsea. Boughton became manager of the theatre in 1876 and, after the death of Rutley's successor J C Hughes, took over control of the Portsmouth Theatres Company in 1882. Rutley's widow eventually sold the theatre to him.

== Architects ==
=== C. J. Phipps ===
Boughton decided on a major rebuild demolishing and replacing the theatre with the present building which re-opened on 4 August 1884 with Gilbert and Sullivan's Princess Ida with principals from the D'Oyly Carte Opera Company. He engaged the most famous theatre architect of the day, C. J. Phipps, who had earlier built London's Gaiety, Vaudeville and Savoy theatres among others. The new building had a four tier auditorium (stalls or pit, dress circle, upper circle and gods). The theatre reflected the rigid social distinctions of the day. The 6-door frontage led to the dress circle to accommodate the wealthy. Patrons in the other floors entered by single doors to the side of the main foyer. Seating capacity was 2,000 but there was space for standing patrons with refreshment bars on each level. The stage was 40 ft deep with a 30 ft proscenium, fly tower and traps.

Phipps also designed the Empire Theatre (Empire Palace Theatre) in Edinburgh Road, built by Corke of Fratton, which opened in 1891. A two-tiered music hall with a small stage, it was a milestone in design for public safety. Phipps' Exeter Theatre Royal had been destroyed in a fire shortly after opening in 1886. The Empire was a radical improvement in build quality and design. The Empire struggled to compete with the Royal, Princes and Kings. A plan in the early 1900s to build a 'super theatre' on the site today occupied by the Zurich offices was rejected by magistrates and the Empire was extensively redecorated and reopened with Marie Lloyd in 1913. It continued to stage variety shows, even when the other venues converted to screening films, but the quality of these declined to the extent that it ended staging "We never clothe 'em" shows, soft core striptease. The Empire was demolished to make way for a supermarket in 1958.

=== Frank Matcham ===
The continued success of the theatre led Boughton to decide to enlarge the stage and he engaged Frank Matcham to renovate the building and build a 65 ft stage in 1900.

Matcham was arguably the greatest theatre architect in UK history. He built over a hundred and fifty theatres across the country including the Tower Ballroom, Sadler's Wells Theatre and the London Palladium.

Matcham perfected increasingly larger floors of seating without supporting pillars, shaped to allow full view of the stage from all seats. He developed 'raked' stages (built at an incline toward the audience) to improve vision from the upper circle and god. Decorative mouldings and shaped frontage to the balcony encouraged better acoustics. Matcham constructed the stage and auditorium area to form a natural bell chamber to project and amplify sound. Comedian Jimmy Tarbuck has said of the Palladium that you can "feel the sound roll around the theatre". Matcham's genius was to create palaces of entertainment which were not only opulent and beautiful but efficient and intimate both for audience and performer.

Matcham enlarged the Theatre Royal stage, rebuilt the dress circle and modified the upper circle and added a cast iron conservatory to the front of the building to allow more patrons into the dress and upper circle bars. The Theatre Royal stage featured a "run-on" or "stage-roller", a large treadmill that allowed horses and vehicles to appear to move on stage. It was a feature of the annual pantomime and it is believed that two racing chariots appeared in a production of Ben Hur shortly after the renovation.

Boughton's success led him to engage Matcham to build two more theatres in Portsmouth, the Prince's Theatre in Lake Road and Kings Theatre in Southsea. The Kings opened in 1907 and is still operating. The Princes Theatre was of a similar structure to the Theatre Royal with a similar cast iron conservatory. It was destroyed in a daylight bombing raid on the city in 1942 during a children's cinema matinee. The three theatres constituted the Portsmouth Theatres Company with a common repertory troupe.

== Famous performers ==
Most of the famous performers of the late nineteenth and early twentieth centuries appeared at the Theatre Royal. Sir Henry Irving and his leading lady and mistress, Ellen Terry, appeared many times both individually and together. Sarah Bernhardt performed there on several occasions, including her legendary appearances in later life when in a wheelchair. She left her signature on the wall of the dressing rooms (it was retrieved after the fire in 1972). Marie Lloyd was also a regular. Laurel and Hardy appeared before fame in Hollywood and Oliver Hardy chose the theatre as the venue for his birthday party in 1954. Similarly Morecambe and Wise were among many twentieth-century variety stars who appeared early in their career. Irving died on tour in a Bradford hotel in 1905 but his last complete set of performances was completed two weeks earlier at the Theatre Royal Portsmouth. Ellen Terry was appearing there the week he died. During some of performances his private secretary and theatre manager, Abraham ('Bram') Stoker – author of his biography and of the classic Gothic novel Dracula – worked in the offices backstage.

== Theatre programming ==
At its height from the Victorian to pre-WW2 eras, theatres provided a dynamic programme of entertainment to the communities they served typically, boasting "two shows nightly" with weekend matinees. Like cinemas, the evening programme ran a major and supporting show. As the Victorian wealthy liked to dine late after a trip to the theatre, the main performance started at 7.30 and the support (shorter and usually less demanding such as a light drama or farce) opened afterwards. Audiences could pay to attend either or both performances. With three venues in Portsmouth from the 1900s to the second world war, the city had a stunning level of entertainment choice and provision.

Programming also provides an insight into the talent and workload of the acting profession. In most weeks, the performances would change with as many as three distinct programmes of shows. Posters from the 1860s show an actor taking the lead in Hamlet followed by the lead in a farce at the start of the week, and the lead role in different plays at the weekend, a formidable memory load.

== Theatre Royal and New Theatre Royal ==
From Shakespeare's time onward, theatre was subject to control and censorship partially out of its moral reputation and partially through recognition of its influence as the world's first form of mass communication. In the eighteenth century legislation insisted that drama could only be performed by theatres that had been granted a royal charter or licence (1737) making them 'patent' theatres. This dispensation entitled them to be known as "Theatre Royal" and display a royal insignia. This accounts for the fact that this is the most common name for 19th-century theatres across the UK. The original 'Portsmouth Theatre' was not patented when Dickens wrote Nicholas Nickleby but gained authorisation at some point thereafter. The patent and title passed to Rutley's theatre in 1856 probably because he reassured the local magistrates that his theatre would be unlike the several 'dubious' places of entertainment then in the city and designed for 'middle class families'.

There is no clear evidence of when or why people began to refer to the theatre as 'New'. From 1856 to 1976 the theatre was officially the Theatre Royal. At some point the 'New' was informally added. Evidence from local newspapers held in the theatres archive at the Victoria and Albert Museum confirm that this was in use by the middle of the century and either began when Rutley's building replaced the one in the High Street or when the Phipps building replaced Rutley's. The frontage of the theatre says both "Theatre Royal" and "New Theatre Royal" indicating that the name was in use by the time Phipps was contracted to design the present building. Archived material indicates that each name was used on material such as programmes.

The Theatre Royal officially became New Theatre Royal when the present trust was incorporated in 1976.

== The RoyalDecline ==
By the 1920s, radio and cinema led to the decline in attendances and, coupled with economic depression and war costs, theatres began to close or convert to film screening. These including the Prince's and Kings. The Theatre Royal was home to a repertory company, The Denville Players, until 1932 when it too had a projection room installed and became a cinema. Portsmouth was subject to extensive damage during The Blitz. The neighbouring Guildhall was gutted by fire and the Prince's destroyed by a direct hit during an afternoon matinee for children but the Royal escaped unharmed. It continued as a cinema until 1948 when it reverted to a variety theatre. According to local academic and musician David Allen, the theatre was the venue for the first live Rock and roll performance in the UK in 1954.

Additional competition from television continued to force closures across the country and the Theatre Royal was eventually forced to shut in 1955. In 1956 Bernard Delfont's 'Brilliant Summer Revue' starring David Nixon was in the Theatre Royal for a Summer Season. In 1957 it opened as a repertory theatre under local impresario Hector Ross but this was short lived and from 1960 it operated only as a bingo hall and a venue for wrestling. For a brief period a young Australian, Robert Stigwood, was Ross's assistant. In the 1960s Stigwood would become one of the leading impresarios in popular music.

In 1966 the owners of the theatre, Portsmouth Theatres Company, sought permission from the council to over-ride its 'listed' status and demolish it. The council agreed, describing the theatre as "an eyesore in the centre of our fine city." A pressure group was formed to oppose this, leading to a council decision in which the proposal was beaten by only one vote.

The empty building began to attract vandals. In 1968 squatters occupied it and valuable brass fittings and roof lead were stolen. The continuing decay and damage led to the formation of the Theatre Royal Society which pressured to defend and preserve the building. This campaign included the locally born actor Brian Murphy who had starred in The Boyfriend and is now a patron of the theatre. The society became the New Theatre Royal trust in 1976.

== The Boyfriend ==
In 1971 the director Ken Russell chose the theatre as the location for a film version of the hit musical The Boy Friend. The play written by Sandy Wilson had been a stage hit in the UK and USA. A love story set on the Riviera in the 1920s, it uses Shakespearean techniques of false identity and final revelation. Russell, who wanted to make a parody of the work of Busby Berkeley, added a story twist by setting it amongst a run-down repertory company with the love story on stage mirrored in one off. He chose the ballet dancer Christopher Gable and the model Twiggy for the lead roles backed by an ensemble cast of experienced stage actors including Barbara Windsor, Brian Murphy, Murray Melvin, Georgina Hale and dancer Tommy Tune; Peter Maxwell Davies, adapted the score.

Russell (who would go on to produce a film version of The Who album Tommy in Portsmouth) shot most of the film on location in the empty theatre and adjoining streets giving it an eerie sense of period and reality. It was to be the Victorian theatre's last performance.

== The fire ==
The following year, 1972, children entered the theatre and lit fireworks setting the stage on fire. A member of the public alerted a patrolling policeman to the smoke but by the time the fire brigade arrived the rear of the theatre was ablaze. Early in the fire the ropes of the safety curtain burned through causing it to fall into place saving the auditorium. (Ironically, the curtain had been faulty and temperamental for many years and regularly refused to operate.) The stage, fly tower and the entire building behind the proscenium arch was destroyed.

Once again, demolition was proposed but the Theatre Royal Society was there to oppose the plan. Amongst those who campaigned to save the theatre was the actor Brian Murphy who had appeared in The Boyfriend. Murphy was born on the Isle of Wight and spent his childhood in Portsmouth.

In 1975, volunteers were allowed back into the building to start the long process of repair and renovation and a trust was formally established to care for the theatre. The New Theatre Royal (Portsmouth) Limited was registered in 1976 with a subsidiary trading company, NTR Trading Limited, as regulations did not allow charities to retail. The Theatre Royal was finally officially the New Theatre Royal. Leading figures in the restoration and rebirth included local teacher John Offord and Jean Salisbury who was made a "Cultural Champion" by the Minister for Sport and Culture in 2010.

The theatre was gradually repaired, largely by volunteers, and slowly came back into operation. In 1984 a small temporary stage was built over the orchestra pit in front of the proscenium arch. Productions were largely restricted to amateur performances.

== Memorabilia ==
Damage to the theatre extended beyond the fire in 1972. Thieves stole valuable brass fittings and other artefacts in the 60's. In the 70's thieves with a van stole auditorium doors which had been removed for renovation whilst volunteers worked in the theatre. In the early 70's artefacts, papers and records including a large collection of posters were moved from the managers office for safekeeping. (The offices and dressing rooms along with the Strand lighting unit were situated to the 'audience' left of the stage behind the White Swan and survived the fire. They were demolished in 1980.) These records were transferred to an empty shop nearby in Guildhall Walk. Two years later, the entire content of the shop were found to have disappeared. Neither the volunteers or the owner of the shop had authorised or knew of their removal. These items were never retrieved.

Sarah Bernhardt left her signature on the wall of the dressing room. This was retrieved after the fire and is now in the possession of the trust.

In the early 'noughties', builders renovating a house in Southsea found a number of posters from the Rutley theatre under floorboards. Most dated from the 1860s. They were sold to Langford Antiques in Albert Road Southsea where they were framed and sold. Several were purchased for the theatre trust.

== Fundraising ==
=== Boyden Report and Onyx Funding ===
In 2003, faced with on-going financial stringency, the Board of Trustees commissioned the Boyden Report which advised a short closure and re-launch and the appointment of an experienced professional director. Shortly after this appointment, the Project Director of a local social enterprise (The Portsmouth and SE Hampshire Partnership) which had been entrusted with finding suitable projects for £1m from the Onyx environmental trust, added the NTR as a last minute addition to the shortlist. The theatre was awarded £440,000, the largest single grant given by the Onyx Trust. With additional funding, the Matcham cast iron portico was renovated, central heating and a new pit bar installed, and original vintage seating in the stalls which had previously been used on the set of Baz Luhrmann's Moulin Rouge!. A larger stage was built in front of the proscenium. To accommodate this, the frontage of the lower boxes had to be removed. Investigation revealed that these were prefabricated and fitted using large bolts. They were stored beneath the stage until eventually reinstatement when the new stage house was built. An external lighting rig was erected over the open stage.

The renovation led to a dynamic programme development endorsed by the trust board. Drama, stand-up comedy, music and dance became features of each season whilst work with local schools and community groups was expanded. The trust developed links with the University of Portsmouth, a funder with the city council. The New Theatre Royal gained prominence on the cultural scene of the city. However, performances were still restricted by the lack of a proper stage and get-in and limited seating capacity. Inevitably, lack of operating finance became problematic again necessitating a period known as "NTR Lite" with less risky but less exciting programing.

Shortly after the recruitment of a new executive (artistic) director, the trust embarked upon the most challenging an exciting period since the remodelling by Matcham.

=== "Let's Make It Great" ===
The board of trustees appointed a sub-committee to investigate and advise on the options for capitalising on its vacant "back lot". The outcome was a plan to rebuild the stage and backstage accommodation in addition to teaching facilities for the university. In 2009, London-based architects Peynore and Prasad were contracted to design the building and a professional fundraiser was appointed to raise the estimated £4m cost to the trust. A fundraising program "Let's Make It Great" began at the opening of 2010 with a weekend finishing with a gala performance MC'd by comedian and broadcaster Sandi Toksvig and headlined by the actor Sheila Hancock, chancellor of the university. Broadcaster and musician Paul Jones and actor Christopher Timothy were among the cast list which included popular and classical music, comedy, opera and dance. At the end of the evening, Sheila Hancock accepted the invitation to become the patron of the theatre.

In May 2010, the theatre hosted the first screening in nearly three decades of The Boy Friend, an honour it shared in the same week with the Verona Film Festival. "The New Theatre Royal in Portsmouth hosted a special 35mm screening of The Boy Friend on 16 May 2010, featuring Ken Russell, Twiggy, Sir Peter Maxwell Davies, Brian Murphy, and Murray Melvin. The event included an interview led by local TV presenter Sally Taylor, and following it, Twiggy, Sir Peter, and Brian Murphy joined Sheila Hancock as patrons of the theatre." The screening was preceded by an interview with the director Ken Russell and cast members Twiggy, Brian Murphy, Georgina Hale and Murray Melvin and the score composer Sir Peter Maxwell Davies. The interview was hosted by local television personality Sally Taylor. Following this event, Twiggy, Sir Peter and Brian Murphy agreed to join Sheila Hancock as patrons.
