= Rebecca Isaacs =

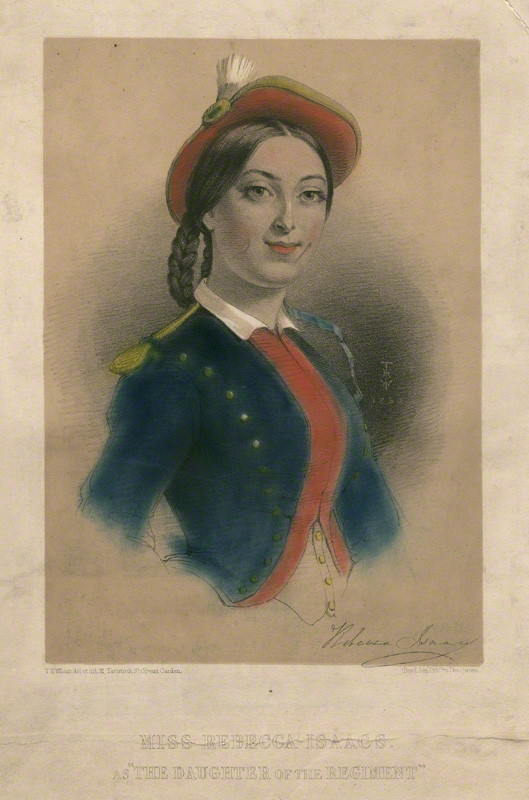
Rebecca Isaacs as Marie in The Daughter of the Regiment

Rebecca Isaacs (26 June 1828–21 April 1877) was an operatic soprano of the mid-19th century who was the Directress of Operas at the Strand Theatre and who created the role of Leila in Satanella at the Royal Opera House in 1858.

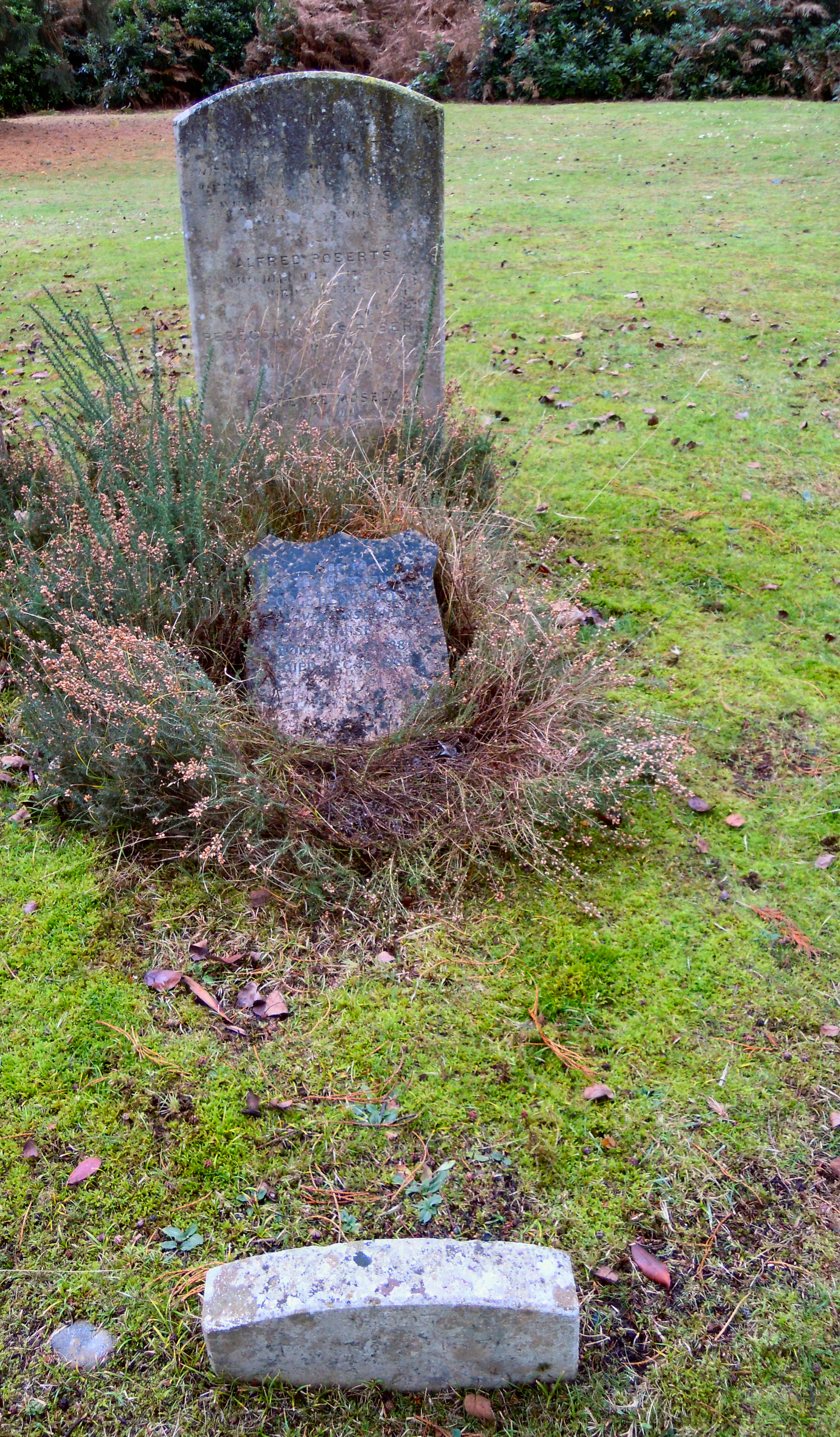
Isaac's grave in Brookwood Cemetery

Born in London, she was the daughter of the Jewish actor and singer John Isaacs (1791-1830), who trained her for the stage. She first appeared in The Barn Burners at the City Theatre in London in 1835 and in 1836 was in the burletta Riquet with the Tuft at the Olympic Theatre. In 1838 she played the central role of the young chimney sweep in Richard Brinsley Peake's The Climbing Boy: A Comic Drama.

She toured with the Distin family and sung under the name 'Miss Zuchelli' in 1838. With a voice "of great compass and sweetness", she acted at Drury Lane taking the leading roles in English operas during 1846, and was Directress of Operas at the Strand Theatre from 1852 to 1853, and again in 1855. She played in The Mountain Sylph at the Royal Opera House in Covent Garden in 1852.

She was the first Leila in Satanella at Covent Garden in 1858. In 1860 she appeared at the Pavilion Theatre as Amina in La sonnambula, as Cinderella in La Cenerentola by Rossini, as Marie, the lead role in The Daughter of the Regiment, and as Lucia in Lucia di Lammermoor. She often appeared in concerts and operas with Sims Reeves.

Her husband was Thomas Roberts (c1831-1876), a non-Jewish dental surgeon and acting manager of the Princess's Theatre.

She is buried in the Actors' Acre in Brookwood Cemetery in Surrey with her husband, her infant son Alfred Roberts who died aged three weeks, her daughter Florence Mosely (1857-1925) and her grandson George Henry Mosely (1887-1969).

The National Portrait Gallery in London holds two portraits of Isaacs in its collection.
