= Ellen Chaplin =

English actress

Ellen Chaplin [married name Fitzwilliam] (c. 1822–1880), was a British actress.

The wife of Edward Francis Fitzwilliam, whom she married on 31 December 1853, was the eldest daughter of Thomas Acton Chaplin who died in November 1859.

She made her first appearance in London at the Adelphi Theatre on 7 October 1841, when she played Wilhelm in the aquatic spectacle Die Hexen am Rhein. For 22 years she was a prominent member of the Haymarket company under the management of J. B. Buckstone. Leaving England for Australia in 1877 she soon became a great favourite in the colonies. After a twelve months' engagement with Mr. Lewis of the Academy of Music, Melbourne, she joined the Lingard company. She was taken ill in Murrundi, New South Wales, but was able to proceed to New Zealand, and acted at Auckland, where she died from acute inflammation on 19 October 1880, aged 58 (Era, 26 December 1880, p. 4; Theatrical Times, 18 November 1848, p. 439, with portrait).
