= Royal Strand Theatre =

Theatre in London

- Barker's Panorama; Rayner's New Subscription Theatre; The New Strand (Subscription) Theatre; Punch's' Playhouse and Marionette Theatre
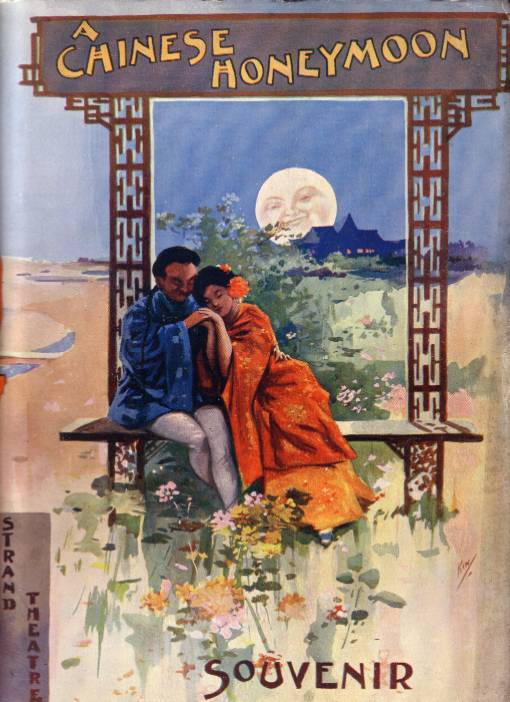
- 2nd Anniversary Souvenir from A Chinese Honeymoon (1903)
- Interactive map of Royal Strand Theatre
- Address: Strand, Westminster; London
- Coordinates: 51.51239°N 0.11600°W
- Owner: Benjamin Lionel Rayner
- Capacity: c. 1500
- Designation: Demolished
- Current use: Site occupied by station

Construction
- Opened: 15 January 1832
- Rebuilt: 1836 unknown 1858 S. Reynolds and Samuel Field; 1865 John Ellis; 1882 Charles J. Phipps
- Years active: 1832–1904
- Architect: Charles Broad

The Royal Strand Theatre was located in the Strand in the City of Westminster. The theatre was built on the site of a panorama in 1832, and in 1882 was rebuilt by the prolific theatre architect Charles J. Phipps. It was demolished in 1905 to make way for Aldwych tube station.

== History ==
From 1801, Thomas Edward Barker set up a rival panorama to his father's in Leicester Square, at 168/169 Strand. On the death of Robert Barker, in 1806, his younger brother, Henry Aston Barker took over management of the Leicester Square rotunda. In 1816, Henry bought the panorama in the Strand, which was then known as Reinagle and Barker's Panorama, and the two panoramas were then run jointly until 1831. Their building was then used as a dissenting chapel and was purchased by Benjamin Lionel Rayner, a noted actor, in 1832.

=== Subscription theatre ===
Rayner engaged Charles Broad to convert and extend the original building as a theatre. This was built in 1832 in seven weeks, at a cost of £3,000. The theatre opened on 15 January 1832, as Rayner's New Subscription Theatre, with a production of Struggles at Starting. Within weeks, the venture failed and was sold to the actress Harriet Waylett, re-opening on 29 May as The New Strand (Subscription) Theatre with Damp Beds. Again, the theatre lacked support and closed in November 1832. The theatre was re-opened in early 1833 as the New Strand Theatre, by Frances Maria Kelly – who also based a drama school there. The singer, Rebecca Isaacs was the Directress of Operas at the theatre from 1852 to 1853, and again in 1855. The theatre failed because it was unlicensed, and this put it into competition with London's patent theatres. Presenting plays by subscription was one method of evading the Acts, but tickets could not be sold at the theatre. This was circumvented by selling them at neighbouring shops; and at one point the public were admitted free on purchase of an ounce of rose lozenges for four shillings (stalls), or half an ounce of peppermint drops for two shillings (the pit) from the neighbouring confectioners.

The theatre was again closed under the Patent Acts in March 1835, and the owners brought before the magistrates. It reopened on 25 April 1836, with the necessary licence, under the management of Douglas William Jerrold and William John Hammond. The theatre was enlarged in 1836 and a gallery added in 1839. In 1849 the manager was William Farren. For a while in 1851 it was owned by William Robert Copeland, and known as Punch's' Playhouse and Marionette Theatre. In 1856 the manager was T. Payne.

Frank Talford wrote the earliest burlesque for the Strand, full of excruciating puns and enlivened by bright songs. Mythological subjects were popular. In one such piece in 1850 the afterwards famous Mrs. Stirling played Minerva, Mrs Leigh Murray was Apollo, and Rebecca Isaacs was Venus.

=== The Swanborough years ===
In 1858, the theatre was taken over by the Swanborough family (originally Smith). Henry V. Swanborough rebuilt it at a cost of £7,000and opened it on 5 April 1858 as the Royal Strand Theatre. His daughter, Louisa, was acting manager for a couple of years until her marriage to Major Lyon. Henry's eldest son William was also an active manager. Following Henry's depression and suicide in 1863, ownership passed to Henry's widow Mary Ann. Between 1868 and 1871, Eleanor Bufton (married to Arthur Swanborough) managed the Greenwich Theatre, and resources were shared between the two theatres.

According to Erroll Sherson, writing in 1923, the Strand was burlesque's first real nursery and its permanent home. Here graduated Marie Wilton (later Lady Bancroft), Patty Oliver and Edward Terry; each would later maintain the burlesque tradition at the Prince of Wales's, The Royalty, and The Gaiety, respectively. For some years, the Strand's programme began with a short drama, many written by H. T. Craven, including, The Postboy, Milky White, and Meg's Diversion. Then followed a burlesque by H. J. Byron, W. Brough, or F. C. Burnand.

Under the Swanboroughs, the theatre enjoyed success, with Ada Swanborough performing in H. J. Byron's burlettas and featuring a cast that included James Thorne, Edward O'Connor Terry, Miss Raynham, Mrs. Raymond, H. J. Turner and Marie Wilton,. These began with The Lady of Lyons, or Twopenny Pride and Pennytence; Fra Diavolo Travestie, or The Prince, the Pirate and the Pearl; The Maid and the Magpie, or The Fatal Spoon (an early play to include a dance at the end of a song); and The Babes in the Wood and the Good Little Fairy Birds.

The celebrated burlesque on Kenilworth, first performed in 1859 and played over many years, brought the Strand great prosperity. It had a strong cast including Louisa Swanborough as the Earl of Leicester, H. J. Turner as Mike Lambourne, Mrs. Charles Selby as Queen Elizabeth, Marie Wilton as Sir Walter Raleigh, Patty Oliver as Amy Robsart, Charlotte Saunders as Tressillian, John Clarke as Varney and James Bland as Wayland Smith; Bland was reputed to be the king of the burlesque actors. Leicester was later played by Maria Ternan. The burlesque that lived longest in the memories of old playgoers, according to Sherson, was Brough's, The Field of the Cloth of Gold.

Henry Jameson Turner was by far the longest serving actor at the Strand. His first appearances pre-dated the Swanboroughs. He moved from the Lyceum to the Strand in 1849, his first wife, Eleanor, and eldest daughter, Ellen, also appearing with him. He served under both Farren and Payne, and was in the Swanborough's first production. Turner also ran a theatrical agency. His final appearance was at a benefit for the Strand General Theatrical Fund (of which he had been treasurer) in April 1882.

The first appearance of the popular pantomime character, Widow Twankey, played by James Rogers in Byron's version of Aladdin, took place at The Strand in 1861. Other successful works in the 1870s, included the hit operettas Madame Favart and Olivette. It also hosted W. S. Gilbert and Frederic Clay's comic opera Princess Toto in 1876.

The theatre was rebuilt in 1865, re-opening 18 November 1865, destroyed by fire on 21 October 1866 and again rebuilt. In 1870 two men wearing drag were arrested outside the building on public decency charges, these were changed to charges of sodomy, but were subsequently dropped. This case is historically significant as it linked public imagination between cross-dressing and sodomy.

In 1882, the theatre was condemned as having inadequate fire precautions and closed on 29 July. It was rebuilt by Charles J. Phipps, re-opening on 18 November 1882 with improved access. The cost to Mrs. Swanborough was heavy. Attempts were made to recoup the expenditure through a sale, but this was unsuccessful. Mrs Swanborough had to go through the Bankruptcy Court in 1885.

Sherson said that, after this, the house ceased to be the old Strand. It came under the direction of Alexander Henderson, who produced adaptations of French light opera with the best results. Though it regained a portion of its vogue under the direction of a very clever American actor, John S. Clarke, it was no longer one of the attractions of the London theatrical world. The musical comedy A Chinese Honeymoon opened in October 1901 and ran at the theatre for a record-breaking 1,075 performances, until closing in 1904.

== Demolition ==
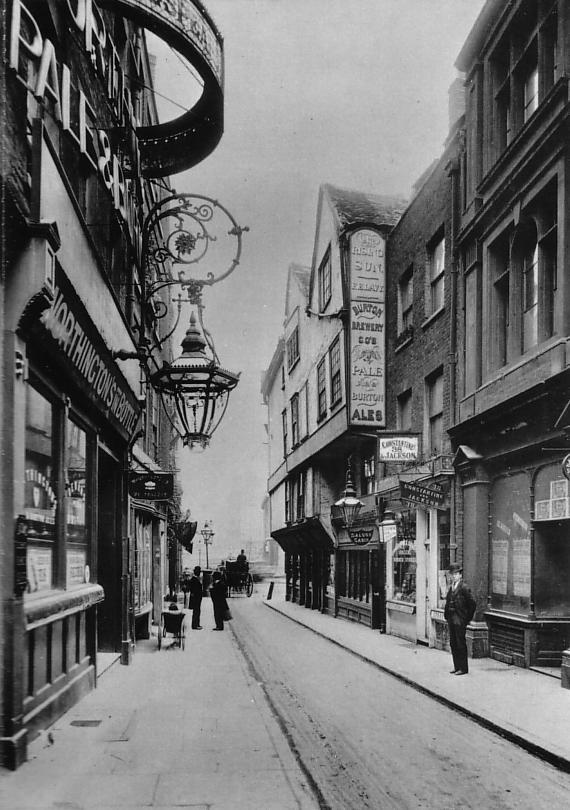
A 1901 postcard of Wych Street, shortly before its demolition. It lay north of the theatre, but was typical of the area.

In the 16th century, Strand had hosted many grand houses by the River Thames and the area began to be built up. By the end the 18th, it had become a notorious rookery - an overcrowded slum. The area had been unaffected by the Great Fire of London and survived with narrow streets, unsuited to the new traffic. A scheme was instituted to build a new road, Kingsway between Holborn and Strand, culminating in a grand crescent, Aldwych. After many false starts, the scheme was begun in 1901 by the London County Council. To go with this a link was built to the tube station at Holborn, and 13 May 1905 the theatre was acquired by Act of Parliament closed and demolished to enable Aldwych underground station to be constructed on the site. The many actors who were attached to the theatre protested against its deconstruction. The station is now closed but is said to be haunted by an angry actress who still scares people today.

Apart from this theatre, the Olympic, Opera Comique, Globe, Old Gaiety and many others were swept away by the scheme, they were replaced by the Gaiety, Aldwych and New Theatres, and a realignment of the Lyceum.
