= Royal Hippodrome Theatre =

Theatre in Eastbourne, England

- Theatre Royal and Opera House
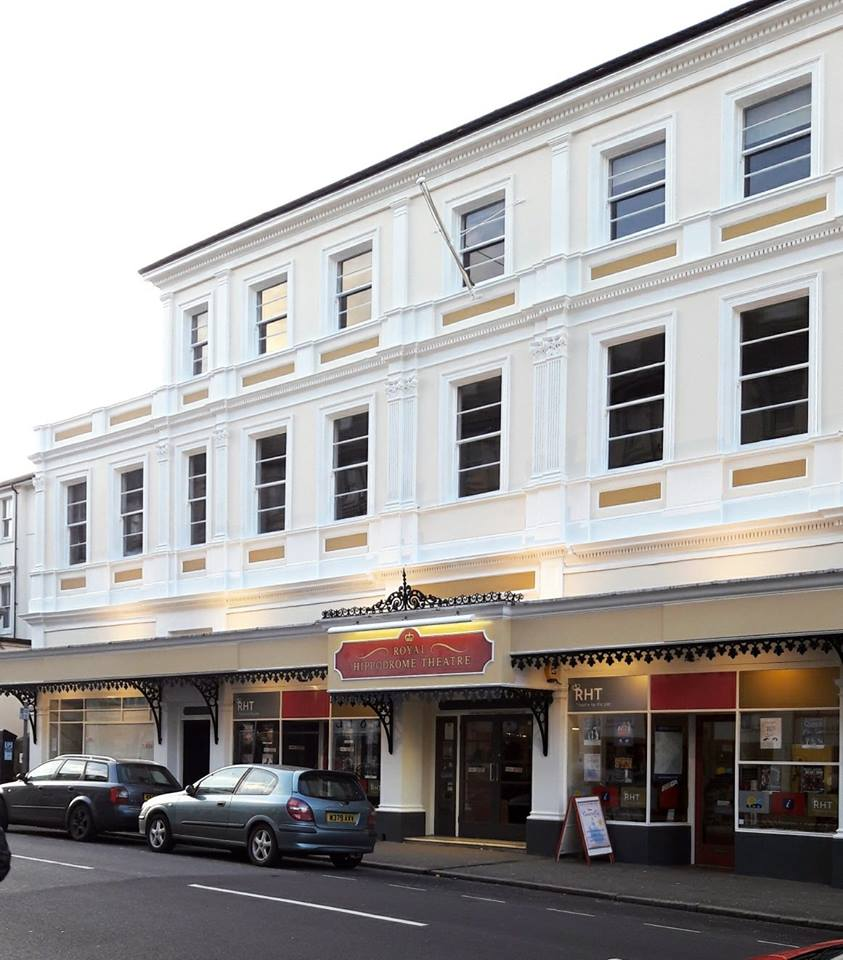
- Interactive map of Royal Hippodrome Theatre
- Address: Seaside Road; Eastbourne, East Sussex; United Kingdom
- Coordinates: 50.7689°N 0.2922°E
- Owner: Eastbourne Borough Council
- Capacity: 516 on 3 levels
- Type: Variety theatre
- Designation: Grade II listed

Construction
- Opened: 2 August 1883
- Rebuilt: 1990 proscenium arch and boxes refurbished 2018 facade restored 2023 auditorium restored
- Architect: Charles J. Phipps

Website
- www.royalhippodrome.com

The Royal Hippodrome Theatre is a theatre in Eastbourne which dates back to 1883, making it the oldest theatre in the town. It was designed and built for the theatre manager and impresario George Beaumont Loveday by the eminent theatre architect C J Phipps. The venue has been host to one of the longest running summer seasons in the country for several years, opening in April and closing in October.

== History of the theatre ==
=== Origins and early years ===
The Royal Hippodrome Theatre opened on Thursday 2 August 1883. At the time Eastbourne was emerging as a highly fashionable destination, encouraged by regular visits from the Prince of Wales.

Its original name "Theatre Royal and Opera House" survived for about 20 years but from around 1904 it became The Royal Hippodrome Theatre. The reason for the name change is unclear, but it seems to mirror a change in style and use. In the early days plays and light opera (including the touring company of the D'Oyly Carte) were presented but these gradually gave way to music hall and variety shows. Music hall programmes had been staged in the Bourne Inn in nearby Pevensey Road until around 1900, and it is true that the Royal Hippodrome Theatre was, and still is at the unfashionable end of town.

The music hall star Vesta Tilley appeared on a bill here in May 1903. The theatre also attracted several other star names during the music hall era including Harry Houdini, Marie Lloyd, Albert Chevalier, Little Tich, Charlie Chaplin, Gracie Fields, Harry Lauder, George Robey, Flanagan and Allen and Max Miller.

Although the foyer was substantially remodelled during the 1930s, the auditorium remains much as it was in 1883. From 1933 summer repertory variety flourished with the Eastbourne Players (a stock company) – there was a resident orchestra of 13 under the baton of Mr Alfred Brocklebank and a permanent theatre staff of 40.

The theatre closed for part of the Second World War, though not before a young Hylda Baker had graced its boards in early 1942. The streets to the east became known as "Hellfire Corner" as they were heavily bombed by the Luftwaffe. The theatre itself escaped a direct hit, almost miraculously since The Lion pub and Caffyn's motor garage only yards away were obliterated; however blast damage caused much of the theatre's original ornate plaster work to be damaged beyond repair, and later this had to be removed.

Elsie and Doris Waters, Harry Secombe, Tod Slaughter (on his farewell tour), Frankie Vaughan, Norman Wisdom, Russ Conway, Diverse Opera and Bruce Forsyth performances are remembered by local community.

The theatre continued in private ownership until 1958 when, with declining audience numbers, the company was forced to look for a buyer. Around that time Southern TV were interested in purchasing the building for a TV studio but negotiations fell through and the building was bought by Eastbourne Borough Council.

In the 1970s it was the summer season for old Hollywood musical extracts, attracting many of the elderly residents and holiday makers, reminiscing of years gone by.

=== 2000s - 2010s ===
At the end 2007 Eastbourne Borough Council took the lease back from Matthews Productions. In 2008 Eastbourne Borough Council spent a considerable amount of money on the theatre to bring it up to date with current legislation. The venue was completely rewired and numerous improvements were made backstage. It also had a brand new emergency lighting and fire detection system installed. Eastbourne Theatres brought in a new producer to stage a show for the summer season that year and due to the refurbishments opened slightly later than normal. The show's producer was That's Entertainment Productions who staged the show Those Variety Days.

In 2009, in an attempt to boost audience figures, Matthews Productions returned to the Royal Hippodrome as a production company, with Eastbourne Theatres continuing to operate the venue.

For the summer Season 2012, Lee Moon Productions produced Sentimental Journey with headliner Jimmy Cricket, with the Eastbourne Hospitality Association as its promoter, advertising the show in the many hotels in the town. The season ran from May to September. The Royal Hippodrome Trust was supposed to be running the theatre from 2012, but owing to circumstances they were not in a position to run the season and so the local hoteliers persuaded the council to support it.

In 2013 the Trust were again asked whether they would be able to take over the running of the theatre, but they were unable to, so the council looked for an alternative solution. On 6 February 2013 the Cabinet of the council unanimously agreed a proposal led by two hoteliers to take over the running of the theatre on a licence for one year (RHT Management) with the aim of setting up a community interest company in 2014. The proposal also included a plan to relocate the Eastbourne Hospitality Association to the theatre so that a part-time tourist information centre could be operated from the building, giving it a more open presence.

=== Present day ===
The theatre is now run by local couple Alex and Debbie Adams, who took over the theatre in 2018.

The venue has since undergone major restorative works including a facade restoration in 2018, a foyer extension in 2019 and a major restoration of the theatre's auditorium which coincided with the theatre's 140th anniversary year.

You can hear Alex talk about his life in the arts and how he has breathed new life back in to what he says had become 'a forgotten place,' in this podcast that was released early in 2025 https://shows.acast.com/660bd076daf1df0017d1e0b1/67f7d01cbb8fcfee75bd4d02

== In popular culture ==
Paul McCartney and Wings used the theatre for three weeks in 1979 as their rehearsal space before embarking on their 1979 UK tour.

The theatre featured as the setting for the opening sequence of the first episode of series 3 of French and Saunders in 1990. During a parody of The Sound Of Music, both the stage and the side path to the stage door are used.

In December 2008, Noel Edmonds and the television channel Sky1 used the theatre to record the programme Noel's Christmas Presents which was broadcast on Christmas Day.
