= Romantic-era panoramas =

A panoramic painting captures all 360 degrees of a scene, as viewed from inside the center of the circle. Typically shown in rotundas for viewing, Romantic Era panoramas were intended to be so lifelike that the viewer became confused as to what was real and what was image.

== Creation of the panorama ==
The concept of the panoramic painting was conceived by Robert Barker in 1787 while he was walking on a hill overlooking Edinburgh, Scotland. He obtained a patent for it in the same year.

Barker's vision for the panorama was to capture the magnificence of a scene from every angle, immersing the spectator completely. His goal was to blur the line where art stopped and reality began.

Barker's first panorama was of Edinburgh, Scotland. He exhibited the Panorama of Edinburgh in his house in 1788, but to little success. The first panorama disappointed Barker, not because of its reception, but because it fell short of his vision. The Edinburgh scene was not a full 360 degrees; it was merely semi-circular.

After the limited success of his first panorama, Barker and his son, Henry Aston Barker, completed a panorama of London from the Roof of the Albion Mills. A reduced version was originally shown in their house, and the larger was put on display later.

To fulfill his dream of a 360-degree panorama, Barker and his son purchased a rotunda at Leicester Square. London from the Roof of the Albion Mills christened the new rotunda, all 250 square metres (2,691 sq ft) of it. The previous version exhibited at their home, in contrast, measured only 137 square metres (1,475 sq ft).

The rotunda at Leicester Square had two levels of different sizes. Spectators observed the scenes from a platform in the center of the rotunda

To fully immerse the audience in the scene, all borders of the canvas were concealed. Props were strategically positioned in the foreground of the scene, and two windows were laid into the roof to allow natural light to flood the canvases. These efforts at concealment were done to increase realism to the extent that it was lifted to the fantastical.

Two scenes could be exhibited in the rotunda simultaneously, however, the rotunda at Leicester Square was the only one to house two panoramas. Houses with single scenes proved more popular. While at Leicester Square, the audience walked down a long, dark corridor to clear their minds after viewing one panorama and before viewing the next. The idea was to have spectators forget what they just saw, leaving their minds blank to view the second scene.

Despite the audience's "mind-blanking" walk in the dark, painted panoramas were designed to have a lingering effect upon the viewer. For some, this attribute placed panoramas in the same category as propaganda of the period, namely that it was no more than an illusion meant to deceive.

The panorama evolved somewhat, and in 1809, the moving panorama graced the stage in Edinburgh, Scotland. Unlike its predecessor, the moving panorama required a large canvas and two vertical rollers to be set up on a stage. The scene or variation of scenes passed between the rollers, eliminating the need to showcase and view the panoramas in a rotunda. Peter Marshall added the twist to Barker's original creation, which saw success throughout the 19th century and into the 20th.

Despite the success of the moving panorama, Barker's original vision maintained popularity through various artists including Pierre Prévost, Charles Langlois and Henri Félix Emmanuel Philippoteaux among others. The revival of popularity for the panorama peaked in the 1880s after having spread through Europe and North America. Unfortunately, there are no surviving panoramas left.

== Cultural response ==
In the late 18th and early 19th century, the panorama attracted a diverse audience. The spectators ranged in social standing because an extensive education was not required to view panoramas; panoramas were an art form that could be appreciated by anyone. People could immerse themselves in the scene and take part in what became known as the "locality paradox". The locality paradox refers to the phenomenon that happens when spectators become so absorbed in the scene on a panorama that they can not distinguish where they are: Leicester Square or, for example, the Albion Mills.

This association with delusion was a common critique of panoramas. Writers feared the panorama for the simplicity of its illusion. Hester Piozzi was among those who rebelled against the growing popularity of the panorama for precisely this reason. She did not like seeing so many people—elite and otherwise—fooled by something so simple.

Another problem with the panorama was what it came to be associated with. Namely, it redefined the sublime to incorporate the material. By associating the sublime with the material, the panorama was seen as an artistic threat—the sublime was never supposed to include materiality.

The subjects of panoramas transformed as time passed, becoming less about the sublime and more about military battles and biblical scenes. This was especially true during the Napoleonic era when panoramas often displayed scenes from the emperor's latest battle, whether it was a victory or a crushing defeat such as depicted in the Battle of Waterloo in 1816.

== Panoramas and romanticism ==
In their earliest forms, panoramas depicted topographical scenes. Such breathtaking sights immediately link panoramas with Romanticism, which is known for its reverence toward the sublime.

Despite this similarity, the poet William Wordsworth has long been characterized as an opponent of the panorama, most notably for his allusion to it in Book Seven of The Prelude. It has been argued that Wordsworth's problem with the panorama was the deceit it used to gain popularity. He felt, critics say, that the panorama not only exhibited an immense scene of some kind, but also the weakness of human intelligence.

It is safe to assume Wordsworth saw a panorama at some point during his life, but it is unknown which it was. Situation as it is, there is no substantial proof he ever went, but his response in "The Prelude" seems too grounded upon experience to suggest otherwise.

Wordsworth's opposition was to the awe-inspiring scenes of the panorama and of other spectacles of the period that competed with reality. He sought to separate poetry from the phantasmagoria enveloping the population. This was perhaps Wordsworth's biggest problem with panoramas: their popularity. For Wordsworth, panoramas basically brainwashed their audiences. The panorama lulled spectators into stupors, inhibiting their ability to imagine things for themselves. Wordsworth wanted people to see the representation and appreciate it for what it was – art.

Conversely, J. Jennifer Jones argues Wordsworth was not opposed to the panorama, but rather hesitant about it. In her essay, "Absorbing Hesitation: Wordsworth and the Theory of the Panorama", Jones argues that other episodes in The Prelude have just as much sensory depth as panoramas had. Jones studied how Wordsworth imitated the senses in The Prelude, much in the same way panoramas did. She concluded that panoramas were a balancing act between what the senses absorbed and what they came away with, something also present in Wordsworth's poetry. By her results then, Wordsworth's similar imitation of the senses proves he was not entirely opposed to them.

== See also ==
Panorama (art)
