= Edward Fitzwilliam =

British actor (1788–1852)

- Born: 8 August 1788 (United Kingdom) Nr Holborn, London, London
- Died: 30 March 1852 (aged 64); Regent Street, London, England
- Spouse: Fanny Fitzwilliam (1822-1852)
- Children: Edward Francis Fitzwilliam(b.2 August 1824); Kathleen Mary Fitzwilliam(b.13 November 1826); Nellie Fitzwilliam (b.?)

Edward Fitzwilliam (1788–1852) was an actor of Irish descent and the husband of noted actress Fanny Fitzwilliam.

Fitzwilliam was born of Irish parents near Holborn in London on 8 Aug. 1788, In 1806 he was actor and property man with Trotter, manager of the theatres at Southend and Hythe. At Gosport in 1808 he was seen by Robert Elliston, who engaged him for his theatre at Birmingham. As Hodge in Love in a Village he made, at the West London Theatre, his first appearance in London. In 1813 he was a leading actor at the Olympic Theatre, under Elliston, with whom he migrated to the Royal Circus, subsequently known as the Surrey Theatre, his first part at this house being Humphrey Grizzle in Three and the Deuce. Under the management of Thomas Dibdin he rose at this house to the height of his popularity, his best parts being Leporello, Dumbiedykes in the Heart of Midlothian, Patch, Partridge in Tom Jones, and Humphry Clinker. At the Surrey Theatre he met Frances Copeland, whom he married on 2 December 1822.

Fitzwilliam – who had once appeared at Drury Lane for the benefit of T. P. Cooke, playing Sancho in Lovers' Quarrels and singing a song, "Paddy Carey", in which he was very popular – joined the regular company at that house 10 November 1821 as O'Rourke O'Daisy in Hit of Miss. From this time his reputation dwindled. Padreen Gar in Giovanni in Ireland, Loney Mactwolter in the Review, and other Irish parts were assigned him. After a time he practically forsook the stage and became a comic vocalist at city entertainments. About 1845 he retired on an annuity from the Drury Lane Theatrical Fund, and died at his house in Regent Street 30 March 1852.

In society, in which he was popular, he was known as 'Little Fitz.' He was about 5 ft. 3 in. in height, robustly built, and had a good-humoured characteristically Irish physiognomy.
