= Robert Burford (painter) =

Robert Burford (1791 - 30 January 1861) was an English painter of panoramas.

== Life ==
Burford was born in 1791 and first exhibited at the Royal Academy in 1812 with A View of Westminster Hall. In conjunction with fellow artist Henry Aston Barker, he opened a panorama on a site later occupied by the Strand Theatre. It was then moved to Leicester Square, where for many years it formed one of the chief attractions of London.

Burford exhibited a succession of panoramas depicting major landmarks across Europe, all of which he personally visited in order to obtain accurate drawings. John Ruskin visited the exhibition as a boy, and spoke in high praise of Burford's abilities in his autobiography Praeterita (1885, p200).

Burford died at his home, 35 Camden Road Villas, Camden, London, on 30 January 1861, just after finishing a view of Naples and Messina.

== Works ==
Amongst the panoramas he exhibited were Battle of Waterloo, Cabool, Baden, The Embarkation of the Queen at Treport, Athens, Constantinople, Grand Cairo, Ruins of Pompeii, The Polar Regions, The Battle of the Alma, Siege of Sebastopol, Venice, Rome and Rio Janeiro.
