= Edward Francis Fitzwilliam =

English composer and music director

Edward Francis Fitzwilliam (1824 – 20 January 1857) was an English composer and music director.

Fitzwilliam, born at Deal, Kent on 2 August 1824, was the son of Edward Fitzwilliam, an actor, and his wife, Fanny Elizabeth Fitzwilliam, actress.

== Education ==
He was educated at the Pimlico Grammar School, at St. Edmund's College, Old Hall, Hertfordshire, and at the institution of L'Abbé Haffrénique at Boulogne. Sir Henry Bishop was his instructor in an elementary course of harmony, and for a few months he resided with John Barnett at Cheltenham studying instrumentation.

== Career ==
In his twenty-first year he composed a Stabat Mater, which was performed at the Hanover Square Rooms on 15 March 1845, with much success. In October 1847 he was appointed by Madame Vestris musical director of the Lyceum Theatre, and remained there for two years.

About this time he wrote the cantata "O Incomprehensible Creator," which was performed at Hullah's concert, 21 May 1851. At Easter 1853 he became musical director of the Haymarket Theatre, and held that position until his death. His principal compositions were "The Queen of a Day," a comic opera, and "A Summer Night's Love," an operetta, both produced at the Haymarket.

He also wrote the overture, act, and vocal music of the Green Bushes for the Adelphi Theatre, the overtures and music of all the Haymarket pantomimes, and of many that were brought out at the Theatre Royal, Liverpool. The music of Perea Nena's Spanish ballets, El Gambusino and Los Cautivos, were entirely his composition. His works were distinguished by an intelligence that gave promise of great excellence had he lived to fully master the technicalities of his art.

He married the actress Ellen Chaplin on 31 December 1853. They had two children; Edward Wentworth and Marian.

== Death ==
After suffering for two years from consumption, he died at 9 Grove Place, Brompton, London, 19 January 1857, aged 33, and was buried (27 January) in Kensal Green cemetery.

== Works ==
1. Farewell to Love, canzonet ... the poetry by J. B. Buckstone (1854)
2. Tarantella [sic]. For the piano forte, etc (1853)
3. Songs of a Student, the poetry selected from the words of Lord Byron, Shelley, Coleridge, Leigh Hunt. Sir Edward Bulwer Lytton, L. Blanchard, S. Godolphin, Mrs. Hemans, etc (1850)
4. The Ranelagh schottische. [P.F.] (1854)
5. Hope is still a fair deceiver, etc.[Song.] (1847)
6. "When should lovers breathe their vows." Ballad ... the poetry by L. E. L[andon] (1844)
7. A Set of Songs. The poetry chiefly selected, etc (1853)
8. I love him ... Ballad, and the cavatina. As dazzling rays of sunrise ... The poetry by B. Cornwall (1835)
9. Maidens oft will sigh and languish, Cavatina. Sung ... in S. Brooks' ... Comic Drama ... "Anything for a Change," etc (1850)
10. Songs for a winter night, the poetry chiefly selected from the most eminent authors, etc (1855)
11. Te Deum, composed for Solo voices and chorus (1852)
12. O Incomprehensible Creator! Cantata (1850)
13. The happy bride, written by E. J. Gill. [Begins: "She lingers at the cottage door."] (1853)
14. I wandered by the brook side. The poetry by R. M. Milnes (1856)
15. You've been well paid, [song] in Buckstone's opera Love's Alarms (1854)
16. Sweet isle of the Ocean. Ballad (1848)
17. Dramatic songs, for Soprano, Contralto, Tenor and Bass voices. and Appendix (1856)
18. [The green bushes.] The Jug of Punch; Irish Ballad (Nelly Machree; Duett) sung in the Drama of the green bushes, written by J. B. Buckstone (1845)
19. Guarded slumber. Serenade [begins: "Sweet river"] the poetry by C. Webbe (1846)
20. The happy bride [A song, begins: "She lingers by that cottage door"] written by E. J. Gill (1845)
21. Oh! Oh! 'tis cruel my lady, duet in the comic opera Love's Alarms ... the words written by J. B. Buckston (1854)
22. "Old Rosin the beau," sung ... in ... the Belle of the Hotel [begins: "I'm a yankee boy"] the words ... by J. B. Buckstone ... arranged by E. Fitzwilliam (1844)
23. "Why lovely Charmer." Glee for 4 voices (1852)
24. The maid with the milking pail, a ballad, the poetry by J. B. Buckstone (1846)
25. Four part-songs for four voices, etc (1855)
26. Heart undaunted, duet in Buckstone's opera Love's Alarms (1854)
27. Hope is still a fair deceiver, romance ... in the opera Love's Alarms ... the poetry by I. B. Buckstone (1854)
28. March to the field of glory, sung ... in the opera Love's Alarms ... the poetry by J. B. Buckstone (1854)
29. Piano Forte compositions, etc (1854)
30. Sea-Side Musings. Six morceaux for the Pianoforte (1855)
31. The leap year Quadrille. [P.F.] (1850)
32. Attention! attention! duet ... in Buckstone's opera Love's Alarms (1854)
33. The Silverhair polka. [P.F.] (1855)
34. The Perdita schottische & the Marie minuet. [P.F.] (1854)
35. My Lady bright! [Song. Words by] Mrs Crawford (1848)
36. There is a little simple dell. Ballad, the poetry by Samuel Carter Hall (1845)
37. "Of Uncle Tom's cabin who has not had a sight?" as sung ... in the extravaganza Mr. Buckstone's Ascent of Mount Parnassus, the words written by J. R. PlancheÌ (1853)
38. While my lady sleepeth. Serenade, the poetry from Lockhart's Spanish ballads (1846)
39. When should Lovers breathe their Vows. [Song. Words by] L. E. L (1845)
40. Come let me take thee to my Breast, etc.[Song.] (1846)
41. La Tarantelle des deÌmons ... pour le piano, etc (1853)
42. Songs of a Student, the poetry selected from the words of Lord Byron, Shelley, Coleridge, Leigh Hunt. Sir Edward Bulwer Lytton, L. Blanchard, S. Godolphin, Mrs. Hemans, etc (1850)
43. The Queen of a day quadrille. [P.F.] (1854)
44. "Hope is still a fair deceiver." Romance ... the poetry by J. B. Buckstone (1844)
45. The Scots Fusiliers March ... for the pianoforte (1853)
46. When should lovers breathe their vows, ballad in Buckstone's opera Love's alarms ... the poetry by L. E. L[andon] (1854)
47. Come let me press thee to my breast. Scotch ballad (the poetry by R. Burns) (1845)
48. The Minstrel's last Farewell. [Song. Words by] Mrs Abdy (1847)
49. Love knows no sleep. Ballad ... The poetry by S. Brooks (1845)
50. As I laye a thynkynge. Ballad, the last lines of T. Ingoldsby [pseud.i.e. R. H. Barham] (1846)
51. When Cavaliers shall bear the sway, [Song,] ... in the Comic Opera ... "The Queen of a Day,"etc (1850)
