= Fanny Fitzwilliam =

English actress (1801–1854)

Fanny Elizabeth Fitzwilliam
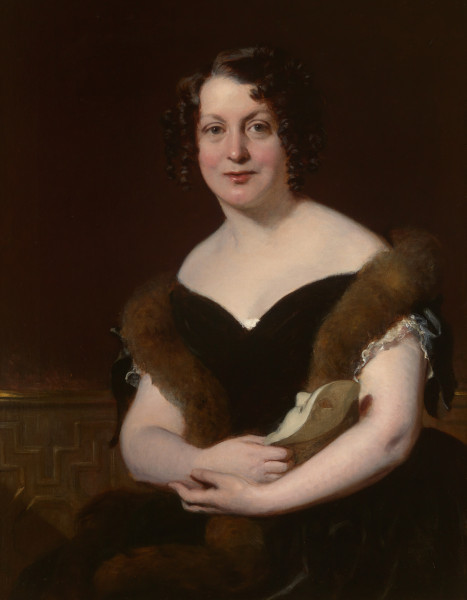
- by John Prescott Knight.
- Born: 26 July 1801; Dover, Kent, England
- Died: 11 September 1854 (aged 53); Richmond Lodge, Putney, England
- Resting place: Kensal Green Cemetery
- Occupations: actress and theatre manager
- Years active: 1802-1854
- Spouse: Edward Fitzwilliam (m. 1822; died 1852)
- Children: Edward Francis Fitzwilliam, Kathleen Fitzwilliam
- Relatives: Robert Copeland (father)

Frances "Fanny" Elizabeth Fitzwilliam (née Copeland) (26 July 1801 – 11 September 1854) was an English actress.

== Life ==
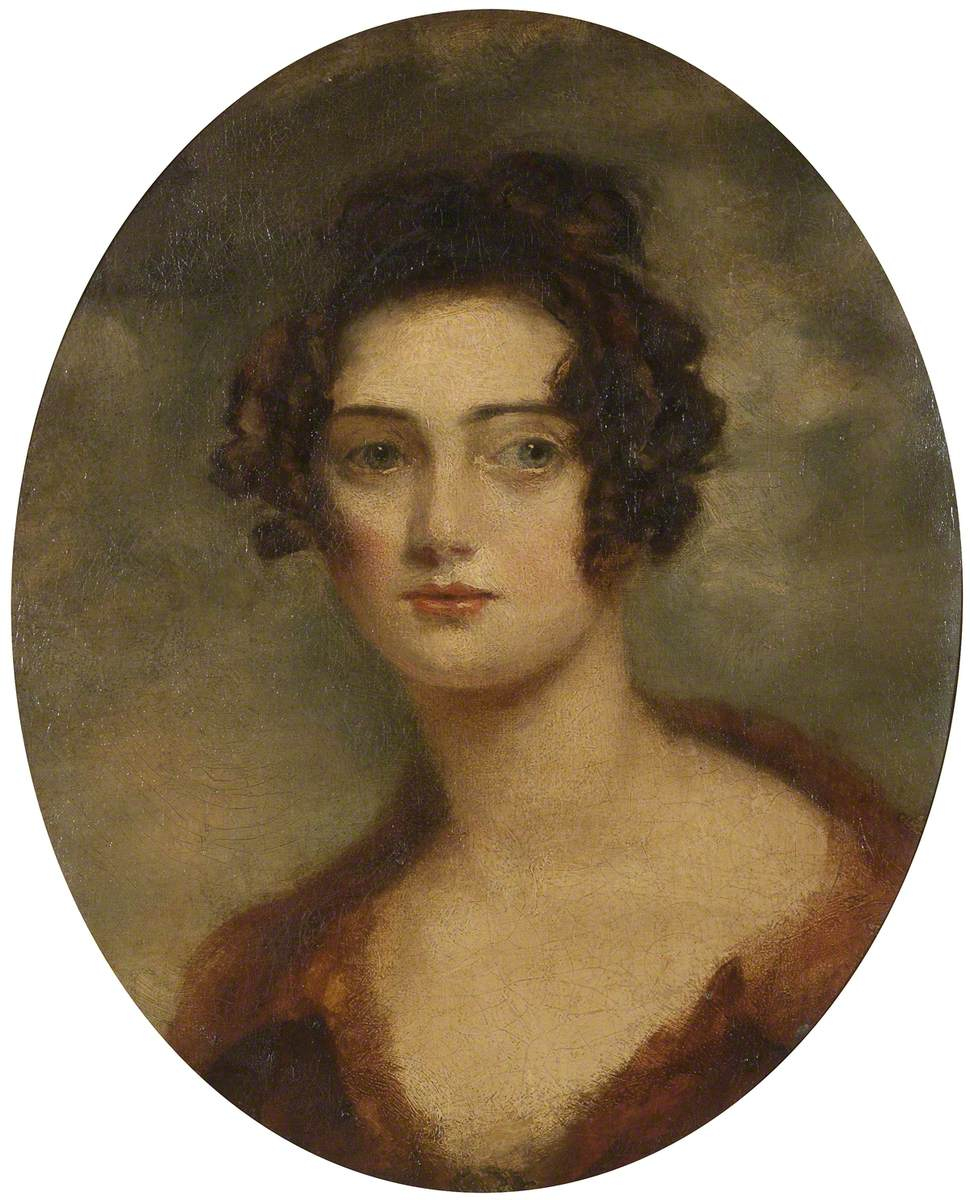
George Henry Harlow (1787-1819) (style of) - Mrs Fitzwilliam (Fanny Elizabeth Copeland, 1801–1854, Mrs Edward Fitzwilliam^) - 446674 - National Trust

She was the actress daughter of Robert Copeland, manager of the Dover theatrical circuit. As "Miss Copeland" she made her name at the Surrey Theatre with Thomas John Dibdin. After marrying the actor Edward Fitzwilliam she performed as "Mrs. Fitzwilliam", becoming a leading London actress and theatre manager. For many years she was closely associated with John Baldwin Buckstone who, after the death of her husband, she was due to marry in 1854.

On 11 September 1854, she died of cholera at Richmond Lodge, Putney, a month before her planned wedding to Buckstone. She was buried at Kensal Green Cemetery, three days after her death.

Fanny had two children from her marriage to Edward – a son, musical composer Edward Francis Fitzwilliam and a daughter, actress and singer Kathleen Fitzwilliam.

Fanny Fitzwilliam as "Addeline"

== Stage appearances ==
- 1802 As Fanny Copeland on stage at Dover Theatre at age 2 or 3 years in the "Stranger"
- 1813 Plays piano at age 12 in a concert at Margate
- 1816 As Norah in The Poor Soldier becomes leading lady actress at the Dover Theatre
- 1817 First appearance in London at the Haymarket Theatre as Lucy in the "Review", Cicely in the "Beehive" and the page (Cherubin) in "Follies of a Day"("Le Mariage de Figaro").
- 1818 Olympic Theatre playing the Countess of Lovelace in "Rochester"
- 1819 (June) in Dibdin's "Florence Macarthy" at the Surrey Theatre is said to have displayed "distinguished merit" (Theatrical Inquisitor, xiv.468)
- 1819 Invited by T Dibdin to Surrey Theatre (see his reminiscences) to play Madge Wildfire in "Heart of Midlothian"
- 1821 (August) Fanny COPELAND and Edward FITZWILLIAM appear in Rolla and Youth, Love & Folly at the Surrey Theatre. Also Mr. Watkins Burroughs and Mr. Pitt(Dibdin)
- 1821 (December) Plays Fanny in Barham Livius's "Maid or Wife" in first appearance at Drury Lane.
- 1822 (February) Now married, Fanny Fitzwilliam is the original Adeline in Howard Payne's "Adeline or the Victim of Seduction" (See picture above)
- 1822 Plays in Dublin, in the country and at the Coburg (the old Royalty)
- 1825 (October) Appears at the Adelphi in a drama called "Killigrew"
- 1825 (October) Is the original Kate Plowden at the Adelphi in Fitzball's the "Pilot", an adaptation of a novel by Fenimore Cooper.
- 1825 Is the original Louisa Lovetrick at the Adelphi in the "Dead Shot"
- 1826 (31 January) With Mr Terry, Mr Yates, Miss Boden in THE PILOT and THE ANACONDA and THE THREE GOLDEN LAMPS at the Adelphi
- 1830 (c. 1–6 March) With John Reeve, Mr Wilkinson and Mrs Daly – THE HEART OF LONDON and THE ELEPHANT OF SIAM at the Theatre Royal, Adelphi
- 1830 (October) Plays Bella at the Adelphi in Buckstone's "Wreck Ashore". Achieves high popularity in many of Buckstone's dramas at the Adelphi.
- 1830 Manages Prince of Wales Theatre
- 1832 at the Royal Clarence according to a US web site\book
- 1832 Becomes manager of Sadler's Wells
- 1832 Manages Sadler's Wells with W. H. Williams until 1833, when Robert William Honner takes over
- 1832 Undertakes the management of Sadler's Wells, transferring some the Adelphi success with "the Pet of the Petticoats", a ballad burletta.
- 1833 (c. 28 January) With John Reeve, Mr Yates and Mrs Daly in DON QUIXOTTE and OTHELLO and the pantomime HARLEQUIN AND THE KING OF CLUBS at the Theatre Royal, Adelphi
- 1835 at the Adelphi on Wednesdays and Fridays in Lent gave a monologue entitled "The Widow Wiggins".
- 1837 at the Adelphi in Billy Taylor! The Gay Young Fellow (27 March 1837 – 1 April 1837) EMICH
- 1837 at the Adelphi as Riverbelle (31) in King of the Danube and the Water Lily (27 March 1837 – 1 May 1837) EMICH
- 1837 at the Adelphi as Norah (24) in Peregrinations of Pickwick (3 April 1837 – 29 April 1837) EMICH
- 1837 at the Adelphi as Elise (3) in Victorine (1 May 1837 – 4 May 1837) EMICH
- 1837 at the Adelphi as Louisa Lovetrick (1) in Dead Shot (2 May 1837) EMICH
- 1837 (November) Plays 12 nights in Boston. Wemyss, ex-manager of the Chestnut Street Theatre, who saw her, predicted that she would make more money in the US than any actress with the exception of Fanny Kemble.(See Wemyss Theatrical Biog p 263 ed. 1848)
- 1837 Goes to the Haymarket with Benjamin Webster
- 1837 Goes to America and opens in New York as Peggy in the "Country Girl"
- c. 1840 Plays with Buckstone in New Orleans and Havannah
- c. 1840 Fanny Fitzwilliam tours England country towns
- 1842 (August) Nicoll lists the author of The Belle of the Hotel; or, American Sketches as unknown, and says it was the same piece acted at Niblo's Garden, New York (August 1842) "written to display the versatility of Fanny Fitzwilliam who was there on a visit." The bill, however, clearly gives John B. Buckstone as the author.
- 1844 at the Adelphi as The Belle (3) in Belle of the Hotel (28 September 1844 – 1 October 1844)
- 1844 at the Adelphi as Protea Snook (3) in Belle of the Hotel (28 September 1844 – 1 October 1844)
- 1844 at the Adelphi as Jerry Phoenix (3) in Belle of the Hotel (28 September 1844 – 1 October 1844)
- 1844 at the Adelphi as Mrs. Macscribblescrabble (3) in Belle of the Hotel (28 September 1844 – 1 October 1844)
- 1844 at the Adelphi as Signor Amoroso (3) in Belle of the Hotel (28 September 1844 – 1 October 1844)
- 1844 at the Adelphi as Shelah Mullins (3) in Belle of the Hotel (28 September 1844 – 1 October 1844)
- 1844 Returns to Adelphi in the "Belle of the Hotel", a monopolylogue.
- 1844 at the Adelphi as Angelique (32) in Fox and the Goose (2 October 1844 – 4 January 1845)
- 1844 at the Adelphi as Elise (12) in Victorine (18 November 1844 – 17 December 1844)
- 1844 at the Adelphi as Bella (6) in Wreck Ashore (25 November 1844 – 30 November 1844)
- 1844 at the Adelphi as Mrs. Matilda Tims (2) in Snapping Turtles (9 December 1844 – 13 March 1845)
- 1844 at the Adelphi as Mrs. O'Blarney (2) in Snapping Turtles (9 December 1844 – 13 March 1845)
- 1844 at the Adelphi as Mr. Fipkins Yaw-Yaw (2) in Snapping Turtles (9 December 1844 – 13 March 1845)
- 1845 (January) At the Adelphi as Nelly O'Neil in Buckstone's "Green Bushes".
- 1845 at the Adelphi as Nelly O'Neil (82) in Green Bushes (27 January 1845 – 10 May 1845)
- 1847 at the Adelphi as Nelly O'Neil (23) in Green Bushes (11 February 1847 – 10 March 1847) EMICH
- 1847 (March) At the Adelphi as Starlight Bess in Buckstone's "Flowers of the Forest". This raises her reputation to its height!
- 1847 at the Adelphi as Starlight Bess (79) in Flowers of the Forest! A Gipsy Story (11 March 1847 – 19 June 1847) EMICH
- 1847 at the Adelphi as Elise (1) in Victorine (10 May 1847) EMICH
- 1847 at the Adelphi as Nell (1) in Devil to Pay (12 May 1847) EMICH
- 1847 at the Adelphi as Mrs. Frederick Youngshusband (1) in Married Life (12 May 1847) EMICH
- 1847 at the Adelphi as Milly (21) in Maid with the Milking Pail (21 December 1846 – 6 March 1847) EMICH
- 1847 at the Lyceum as Margery in A Rough Diamond (First performance 8 November 1847)
- 1848 at the Lyceum with Madame Vestris and Buckstone in Scarecrow. Her daughter Kathleen also on the bill in Theseus and Ariadne or the Marriage of Bachus
- 1850 With Buckstone and Charles Kean – Playbill advertising HAMLET and THE ROUGH DIAMOND and BOX AND COX at the Theatre Royal, Hay-Market, 8 March 1850
- c. 1850 Plays Nan in "Good For Nothing" at the Haymarket.
- c. 1850 Plays Margery in "Rough Diamond" at the Haymarket.
- c. 1850 Plays Dorinne in a version of "Tartuffe" at the Haymarket.
- 1851 (February) With Buckstone, Howe and Parselle in PRESENTED AT COURT and GOOD FOR NOTHING and BLACK EYED SUSAN at the Theatre Royal, Haymarket, c. 19 February 1851
- 1854 (September) Her last performance, the same month as her death. At the Haymarket (Saturday).

== Miscellany ==
Fanny Fitzwilliam was remembered by Charles Dickens, in his The Uncommercial Traveller, for her part as Elise in Buckstone's Victorine at the Adelphi Theatre. This is not surprising as Dickens enjoyed the theatre and was a close friend of John Buckstone, her "partner".

Excerpt from The Uncommercial Traveller CHAPTER XXXII – A SMALL STAR IN THE EAST

"This woman, like the last, was wofully shabby, and was degenerating to the Bosjesman complexion. But her figure, and the ghost of a certain vivacity about her, and the spectre of a dimple in her cheek, carried my memory strangely back to the old days of the Adelphi Theatre, London, when Mrs. Fitzwilliam was the friend of Victorine. "
