= Henry Aston Barker =

Scottish painter (1774–1856)

Henry Aston Barker (1774 – 19 July 1856) was a Scottish landscape and panorama painter and exhibitor, the son of Robert Barker whose business he continued.

== Life and works ==
Barker was born in Glasgow, the younger son of Robert Barker, the panoramic painter, whom he assisted as a boy. At the age of twelve he was set to work making outlines of the city of Edinburgh from the top of the Calton Hill Observatory, and a few years later made the drawings for the view of London from Albion Mills. He later made etchings after these drawings.

In 1788 Barker moved to London with his father, and soon afterwards became a pupil at the Royal Academy. He continued to be his father's chief assistant in the panoramas till the latter's death in 1806, when, as executor, he took over the business, and carried on the exhibitions for 20 years with great success.

He frequently travelled in the course of his work, and in August 1799 left England for Turkey, to make drawings for a panorama of Constantinople. At Palermo, he called on Sir William Hamilton, the English ambassador to the court of Naples, who introduced him to Lord Nelson, who, he wrote, "took me by the hand and said he was indebted to me for keeping up the fame of his victory in the Battle of the Nile for a year longer than it would have lasted in the public estimation" (Barker's memoranda). The panorama of Constantinople was exhibited in 1802, and the drawings were engraved and published in four plates.

In 1801, Barker went to Copenhagen to make drawings for a picture of the battle, and while there he was again received by Nelson. In May 1802, during the Peace of Amiens, he went to Paris and made drawings for a panorama of the city. After this many other panoramas were exhibited, the later ones being chiefly from drawings by John Burford, who shared with Barker the property in a panorama in the Strand, purchased in 1816 from his brother, Thomas Edward. Barker, however, still travelled from time to time, and visited, among other places, Malta, where he made drawings of the port, exhibited in 1810 and 1812; Venice, of which a panorama was exhibited in 1819; and Elba, where he made the acquaintance of Napoleon.

After the Battle of Waterloo, Barker visited the field, and went to Paris, where he obtained from the officers at headquarters all necessary information on the subject of the battle. A series of eight etchings by John Burnett from Barker's original sketches of the battlefield was published, as were also his drawings of Gibraltar. His last grand panorama, exhibited in 1822, showed the coronation procession of King George IV. Of all the panoramas exhibited, that of the battle of Waterloo was the most successful and lucrative. By the exhibition of this picture Barker realised no less than £10,000.

In about 1802 he married the eldest of the six daughters of Rear Admiral William Bligh, who commanded the Bounty at the time of the celebrated mutiny. By her Barker left two sons and two daughters. In 1826 he transferred the management of both the panoramas to John and Robert Burford, and went to live first at Cheam, in Surrey, and then near Bristol.

Barker died on 19 July 1856 at Bitton near Bristol. A list of most of the panoramas painted and exhibited by Henry and Robert Barker was published in The Art Journal (1857, p. 47). His brother, Thomas Edward Barker, although not an artist, was also involved in running the family business, but later set up a rival panorama exhibition with the painter Ramsay Richard Reinagle at 168/9 The Strand, London.

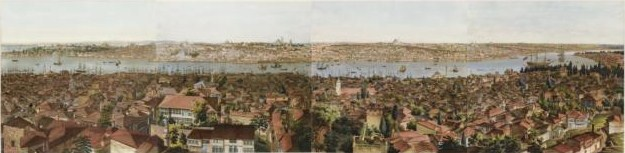
Panorama of Constantinople (1813, aquatint)
