= Amy Roselle =

English actress

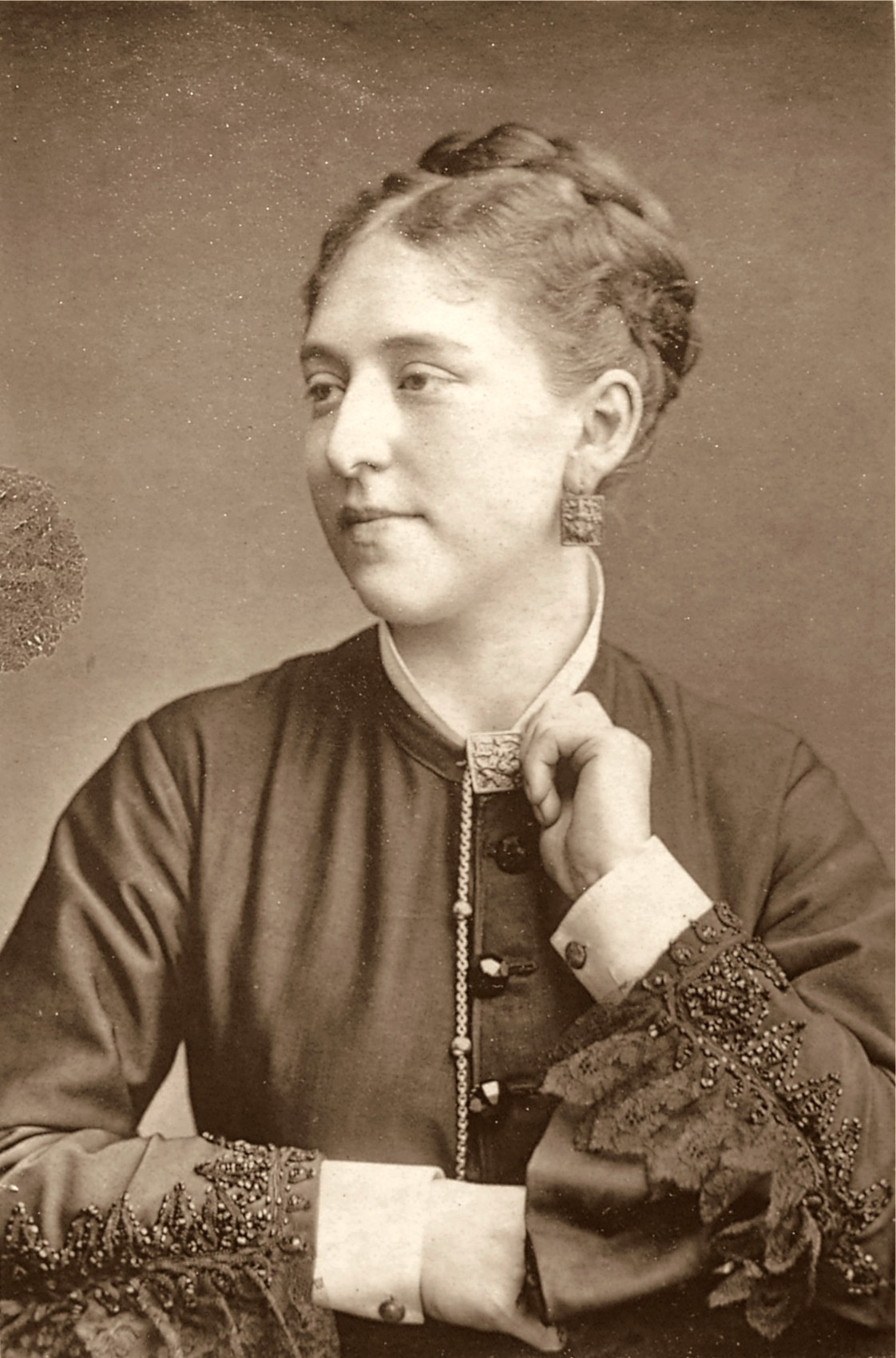
Amy Roselle

Amy Roselle (28 May 1852 – 17 November 1895), born Amy Louise Roselle Hawkins was an English actress who performed in Britain, the United States and Australia. She specialised in Shakespearean roles but also played parts in contemporary dramas. She married Arthur Dacre, and the two toured together with their own theatre company, eventually traveling to Australia. In a murder-suicide pact, her husband shot her dead in 1895.

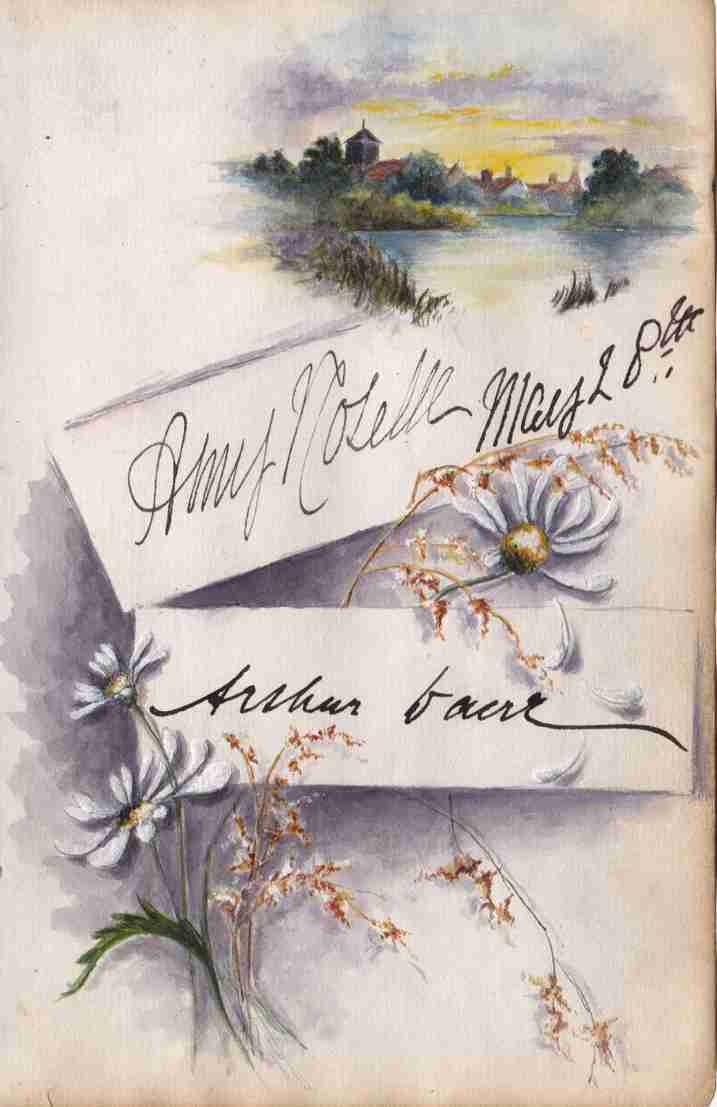
Autographs of actors Roselle and Arthur Dacre (1850–1895)

== Biography ==
Roselle was the eleventh of the thirteen children of William Hawkins (1807–1878). Her mother's maiden name was Rowsell, from which she took her stage name. Although she later claimed that her father was the headmaster of the Glastonbury Grammar School, according to the census returns he was an insurance agent (1851) and later an unemployed commercial traveller (1861). Her brother Percy was a dwarf and played children's parts into adulthood in pantomimes at the Theatre Royal, Drury Lane as "Master Percy Roselle".

Her first role, as a juvenile, was Constance in a version of King Arthur. After this, her father leased the Cardiff and Swansea theatres for two years. At these theatres, Roselle played in Shakespeare and other productions. She debuted in London at the Haymarket Theatre. There, at age 16, she played Lady Teazle and then, opposite Samuel Phelps, numerous leading parts. She replaced Madge Kendal in Diplomacy and played Esther Eccles in Caste, by T. W. Robertson. She appeared opposite Mary Anderson as Cynisca in Pygmalion and Galatea by W. S. Gilbert and created other Gilbert roles, including Darine in The Wicked World (1873) and Eve in Charity (1874). She also performed at the Adelphi Theatre and other London theatres. In 1875, she created the role of Mary Melrose in the sensation Our Boys, which was the longest-running play in history up to that time.

Roselle toured the United States with E. A. Sothern, appearing in New York at Niblo's Garden. She then returned to England and starred as Lady Macbeth opposite Henry Irving at the Lyceum Theatre, London, during the illness of Ellen Terry. She also played Queen Katherine of Aragon in Henry VIII at the Lyceum. Roselle appeared in the title role of Esther Sandraz at the Prince of Wales's Theatre and created the role of Lillian in Old Love for New. In 1881, she originated the role of Mrs. Blythe in F. C. Burnand's long-running comedy, The Colonel.

During a long engagement at the Royal Court Theatre, she met doctor-turned-actor Arthur Culver James (1851–1895, stage name Arthur Dacre), and the two eventually married in 1884. Roselle was in more demand than her husband, but the two insisted on being engaged jointly. In January 1885 the couple appeared in Grundy's The Silver Shield at the Royal Strand Theatre, and for several years toured together in the British provinces, but eventually they had trouble getting a joint engagement and, out of work, ran up debts. A benefit performance was held for Roselle at the Lyceum Theatre on 16 June 1887, at which Trial by Jury was performed. Eventually Roselle and Dacre travelled to Australia where they played in Melbourne, Adelaide, Sydney (at Her Majesty's Theatre) and elsewhere. They did not succeed in paying off their debts, however, and became despondent. In Australia in 1895, as part of a murder-suicide pact, Dacre shot Roselle dead before cutting his own throat.
