= The Wicked World =

Allegorical play written by W. S. Gilbert

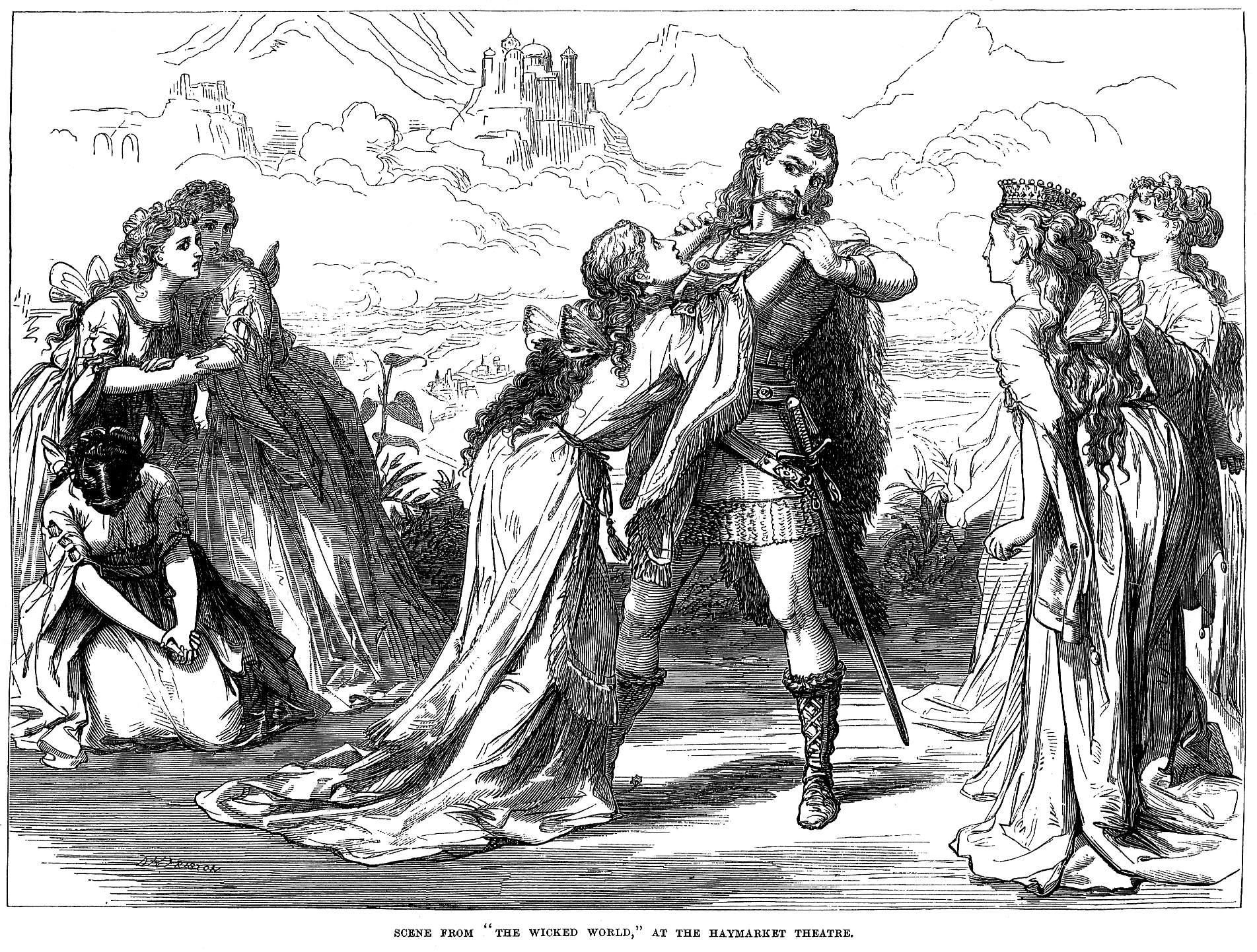
David Henry Friston's illustration of the climax of Act III in The Illustrated London News of 8 February, 1873

The Wicked World is a blank verse play by W. S. Gilbert in three acts. It opened at the Haymarket Theatre on 4 January 1873 and ran for a successful 145 performances, closing on 21 June 1873. The play is an allegory loosely based on a short illustrated story of the same title by Gilbert, written in 1871 and published in Tom Hood's Comic Annual, about how pure fairies cope with a sudden introduction to them of "mortal love."

Set in "Fairy Land", the action occurs within the space of 24 hours. Gilbert envisioned the set as resembling John Martin's 1853 painting The Plains of Heaven: vaporous mountains and headlands around ethereal blue and a flowering slope on which sit white-clad angels. Gilbert also specified that the women characters 'in costume & general appearance – should suggest the idea rather of angels than of conventional fairies, and they exhibit an 'overweening sense of righteousness,' arising from their freedom from sin.

== Background ==
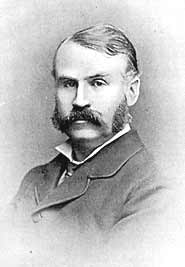
W.S. Gilbert in about 1870

W. S. Gilbert created several blank verse "fairy comedies" at the Haymarket Theatre for John Baldwin Buckstone and starring William Hunter Kendal and his wife Madge Robertson Kendal (sister of the playwright Tom Robertson), in the early 1870s. These plays, influenced by the fairy work of James Planché, are founded upon the idea of self-revelation by characters under the influence of some magic or some supernatural interference. The first was The Palace of Truth in 1870, a fantasy adapted from a story by Madame de Genlis. Second was Pygmalion and Galatea (1871), a satire of sentimental, romantic attitudes toward myth, and The Wicked World was third.

These plays, together with Sweethearts (1874), Charity, and Broken Hearts (1875), did for Gilbert on the dramatic stage what the German Reed Entertainments had done for him on the musical stage. They established that his capabilities extended far beyond burlesque and won him artistic credentials as a writer of wide range, who was as comfortable with human drama as with farcical humour. Although these fairy comedies represented a step forward for Gilbert, the blank verse is a drawback, as it limits Gilbert's vital prose style.

The plot of The Wicked World clearly fascinated Gilbert. Not only did he write a short story on the theme in 1871, but he also co-wrote a parody of it, The Happy Land (1873), and he returned to it in his 1909 comic opera, Fallen Fairies. Gilbert sued The Pall Mall Gazette, which had called The Wicked World indecent because of the references to "mortal love" in the script. Gilbert lost the case, but he had the satisfaction of having his play found inoffensive in a court of law.

Like a number of Gilbert's blank-verse plays, The Wicked World treats the subject of the consequences that ensue when an all-female world is disrupted by men, and the romantic complications they bring. His plays The Princess (1870) and Broken Hearts (1875), and his operas Iolanthe (1882) and Princess Ida (1884), are all treatments of this basic idea. Stedman calls this a "Gilbertian invasion plot". Another of Gilbert's recurring themes that is present in this play, as well as in Broken Hearts, The Yeomen of the Guard, and other Gilbert works, is his distrust of heroic men.

== Original cast ==
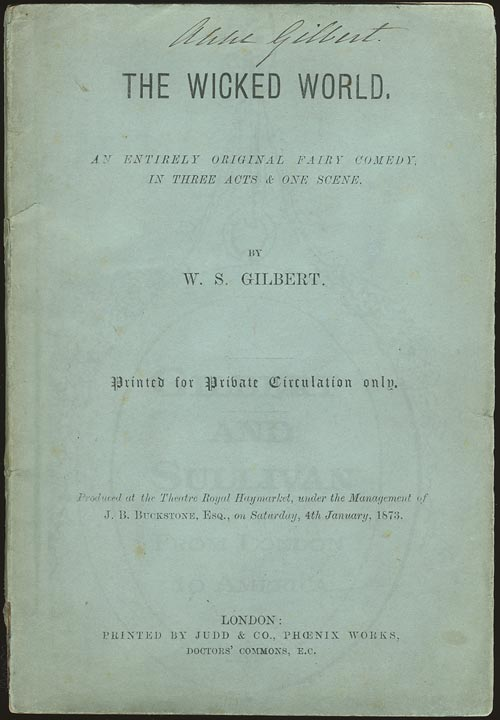
Script formerly belonging to Gilbert's mother, with her signature "Anne Gilbert" on the cover

Fairies

- Ethais – William Hunter Kendal
- Phyllon – Mr. Arnott
- Lutin, a serving fairy – John Baldwin Buckstone
- Selene, a Fairy Queen – Madge Robertson
- Darine – Amy Roselle
- Zayda – Marie Litton
- Leila – Miss Harrison
- Neodie – Miss Henri
- Lochrine – Miss Francis

Mortals

- Sir Ethais – William Hunter Kendal
- Sir Phyllon – Mr. Arnott
- Lutin, Sir Ethais's henchman – John Baldwin Buckstone

== Synopsis ==
Prologue

In a rhymed declaration, a character explains that the author aims to show that "Love is not a blessing, but a curse!" But the speaker disagrees with the author.

Act I

From "Fairy Land", on the upper side of a cloud, the mortal world below is visible. Two female fairies, noble, sinless beings, are curious about the nature of the "wicked world". Selene, the Fairy Queen, appears and explains that every fairy has an exact physical counterpart in the mortal world. A male fairy, Lutin, returns from a journey to the Earth and sends the male fairies Ethais and Phyllon to visit the Fairy King in "mid-earth". They are to return to Fairyland with "some priceless privilege" for the fairies.

After the two fairies leave, the others decide to bring up to Fairyland the mortal counterparts of Ethais and Phyllon, as a law of Fairyland allows them to do. They hope to convert these mortals to the virtuous life by the power of their example. They are also curious about "the gift of Love", which, Selene tells them, is the one compensation mortals have been given for all the evils they must endure on earth. Selene magically summons the mortals to Fairyland.

These counterparts are "barbaric knights", engaged in fighting a duel with each other at the moment that they are transported into the clouds, and Sir Ethais is wounded. They call off the fight for the moment, realising that they are surrounded by beautiful women. The women are impressed by these men: Selene exclaims, "what can gods be like if these are men?" A fairy, Darine, and Selene are both attracted to Sir Ethais. Lutin re-enters, and Sir Ethais mistakes him for his servant Lutin, the mortal counterpart. Lutin, seeing that "mortal love" has struck the fairies, is disgusted, and explains that "love is but the seed; The branching tree that springs from it is Hate!". Feeling out of place, Lutin angrily goes to join the other two male fairies in mid-Earth. Selene kneels at the feet of Sir Ethais, declaring that she loves him.

Act II

Darine and other fairies are waiting by the entrance to Selene's "bower", where Selene has been nursing the wounded Sir Ethais for six hours. The fairies complain to each other about Selene's conduct: "Surely this knight might well have learnt on earth/Such moral truths as she is teaching him." When Selene appears, the others treat her with ironic politeness and leave. Sir Ethais is better now and has declared his love for her. She is naively romantic, while he is a gallant, smooth-talking cad. She gives him a ring as a pledge of love, and they return into her bower.

Darine is still in love with Sir Ethais, and she is intensely jealous. Sir Phyllon tells her that she can win Sir Ethais's love by healing him with a "panacea that will heal all wounds", which is in the possession of Ethais's servant Lutin, a comic character. Darine persuades Selene to summon the mortal Lutin to Fairyland. The servant, finding himself surrounded by beautiful women, concludes: "By some mistake my soul has missed its way,/And slipped into Mahomet's Paradise!" So starved are the fairies of "mortal love" that even he earns their affection.

The mortal Lutin is married to the mortal counterpart of Darine. When the fairy Darine enters, he naturally assumes that, unfortunately, his wife has also been transported to this paradise. Darine asks him for the panacea to heal Sir Ethais, disclosing that she loves Ethais, and Lutin is outraged. Why should he assist his wife's love affairs? He gives her a sleeping potion, telling her that it is the panacea. Darine tells Sir Ethais that Sir Phyllon claims he is a coward and is exaggerating the seriousness of his wound. Sir Ethais, enraged, wants to resume the fight, but he is prevented by his wound. Darine says she has Lutin's panacea, and gives it to him in exchange for a pledge of his love for her – the ring that Selene gave him.

Selene enters, and Darine berates her for introducing mortal love to Fairyland. Selene, seeing the justice of this, resigns as Fairy Queen, and the coronet is placed on Darine's head. Darine also shows her the ring that Sir Ethais has given her. Selene is shocked and disillusioned, becoming bitterly angry with Sir Ethais, Darine, and her fellow-fairies. She cries: "Are ye not content?/Behold! I am a devil, like yourselves!"

Act III

The sleeping potion has worked on Sir Ethais, and he cannot be awoken. The mortal Lutin is told that Darine is not his wife, but merely her fairy counterpart. Relieved, he gives her the real panacea, which she immediately gives to Sir Ethais. He revives and attacks Sir Phyllon, who he believes called him a coward. Phyllon denies it, and Darine admits that she lied to gain Ethais's love. Both men are disgusted by this. Sir Ethais apologises to Selene for betraying her love, but he is appalled by the bitter intensity of her feelings, which is the result of a mortal passion being put into an immortal body.

The three male fairies are returning, and their mortal counterparts must leave. Selene tries to hold Ethais back, because her love for him, though embittered, still burns. Saying, "I go to that good world/Where women are not devils till they die!", he shakes her off and leaps off the cloud and back to earth.

Final Scene

As the mortals disappear, the fairies seem to be awakening from a dream. They regain their true, virtuous selves and are ashamed of their former conduct. Darine and Selene are reconciled, and Selene says that they have no right to feel superior to mortals who fall from virtue more readily because they have been more often tempted. The fairies Lutin, Ethais and Phyllon have brought great news. Their king has decided to bestow on the fairies the gift of mortal love! Selene's final speech, rejecting this gift, prefers the fairies' life of placid tranquillity to the interesting but tempestuous life the mortals enjoy. "No, Ethais – we will not have this love!"
