= Madge Kendal =

English actress and theatre manager (1848–1935)

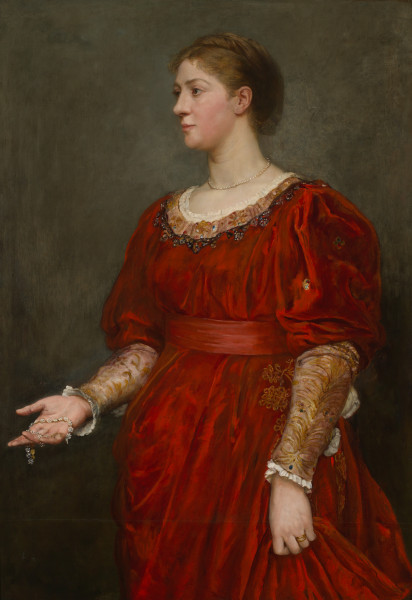
Kendal by Valentine Cameron Prinsep, in the role of Lady Giovanna in Tennyson's The Falcon, 1879

Dame Madge Kendal DBE (born Margaret Shafto Robertson; 15 March 1848 – 14 September 1935) was an English actress of the Victorian and Edwardian eras, best known for her roles in Shakespeare and English comedies. Together with her husband, W. H. Kendal (né Grimston), she became an important theatre manager.

Madge Kendal came from a theatrical family. She was born in Grimsby in Lincolnshire, where her father ran a chain of theatres. She began to act as a small child and made her London debut at the age of four. As a teenager she appeared with Ellen and Kate Terry in Bath, and played Shakespeare's Ophelia and Desdemona in the West End. Under the management of J. B. Buckstone, she joined the company of the Haymarket Theatre in London in 1869, when she was 21. While in the company she met and married the actor W. H. Kendal. After their marriage, in August 1869, the two made it a rule to appear in the same productions, and became known to the public as "The Kendals". They appeared together in new plays by such dramatists as W. S. Gilbert and Arthur Pinero, and from time to time in classics by Shakespeare, Sheridan and others.

After a series of generally successful appearances in London and on tour in Britain, the Kendals joined the actor John Hare in running the St James's Theatre between 1879 and 1888, transforming the fortunes of their theatre, previously known for financial failure. In the late 1880s and early 1890s the Kendals spent much of their time in the US, touring more than 40 cities, and making a considerable amount of money. After returning to acting in Britain for more than a decade, they retired in 1908 from their long careers on the stage.

Madge Kendal was generally considered a finer actor than her husband, and was particularly known for her performances in comic parts. Critical opinion was more divided about her performances in serious roles; some critics regarded her naturalistic acting as sensitive, while others found it cold. The Kendals were part of a movement to make British theatre more socially respectable, and she became known as "the matron of the English theatre". She was active in charitable causes but became estranged from her four surviving children later in life. Kendal outlived her husband and died in retirement at her home in Chorleywood, Hertfordshire, at the age of 87.

== Life and career ==
=== Early years ===
Madge Robertson, later Kendal, was born in Grimsby in Lincolnshire, (Note: Her place of birth was 58 Cleethorpes Road, Grimsby. Some early profiles of Kendal mistakenly take her birthplace to be the adjoining town of Cleethorpes; this error has been corrected in later biographical sketches.) the youngest of the reportedly 22 children of William Shaftoe Robertson and his wife Margharetta Elisabetta, née Marinus. Her father was from a theatrical family. He performed at eight theatres his family owned in towns in and around Lincolnshire and later became manager of the same. Her mother was from a Dutch family: her father taught languages in London, and she spoke English with no trace of a foreign accent. At the age of 17, she joined the Robertsons' company, meeting William, whom she married in 1828. Her eldest brother was T. W. Robertson, a dramatist who led the movement toward naturalistic acting and design in theatre. Her elder sisters Fanny (1830–1903) and Georgina (1840–1913) became actresses. Another brother, Edward Shafto Robertson (1844–1871), became an actor. Kendal attended a music academy and later recorded in her memoirs that her father continually educated her in literature.

Lincolnshire theatres gradually became financially unviable, (Note: In a 1900 biography of the Kendals, T. Edgar Pemberton attributes the decline of such provincial circuits to the effect of the railways, which "destroyed the comparative isolation of the small from the larger towns … local interests became absorbed in the now accessible wonders to be seen in the great world outside".) and the Robertsons moved to London in the early 1850s, where William became joint manager of the Marylebone Theatre. There, in 1854, aged five, Kendal played the role of young Marie in the drama The Struggle for Gold; or, The Orphan of the Frozen Sea by Edward Stirling, under her father's management. Other child roles quickly followed: Jeannie, a blind girl, in The Seven Poor Travellers (a stage adaptation of a story by Charles Dickens), and roles in the pantomime Tit-Tat-Toe and an old melodrama, The Stranger, by August von Kotzebue.

The family moved to Bristol in 1855, where Kendal played Eva in a dramatised Uncle Tom's Cabin, in which she had four songs. Her singing was much praised, and an operatic career seemed possible, but she contracted diphtheria, and her voice suffered after the removal of her tonsils. Nevertheless, she played a singing role in A Midsummer Night's Dream at the Bath Theatre in 1863, starring the sisters Ellen and Kate Terry as Titania and Oberon, respectively. Seventy years later Kendal recalled the production: "Even today I remember Ellen Terry's performance of Titania as a dream of charm. As girls we were 'Nellie' and 'Madge' to one another and 'Nellie' and 'Madge' we remained until her death".

Over this decade, the Robertsons played steadily in provincial theatres. After Bristol and Bath there was a false start in Kendal's career when she was engaged to play leading roles in the West End. In July 1865 she opened at the Haymarket Theatre, playing Ophelia to the Hamlet of Walter Montgomery. Her performance attracted favourable notice. The Era wrote:

Miss Madge Robertson … is youthful in figure, but thoroughly practised in her art, and has a bright, intelligent face, which seems capable of expressing every variety of emotion. The mad scene in the fourth act was rendered with much taste, pathos and discrimination, and the debutante obtained a conspicuous share of the honours of the evening.

In the same Haymarket season she played Blanche to Montgomery's King John, and Desdemona to the Othello of Ira Aldridge. But despite good business at the box office, Montgomery was not a top-rank star, (Note: The critic William Archer called him "a second-rate actor ... virulent but vulgar, energetic but decidedly provincial".) and the season did not mark a breakthrough in the leading lady's career. Returning to provincial theatres, Kendal and her father followed Montgomery to the Theatre Royal, Nottingham, where Montgomery had been appointed director, and in the inauguration in September she spoke the prologue in Sheridan's School for Scandal. Later the same year she appeared there as Nerissa, with Mary Frances Scott-Siddons as Portia and Montgomery as Shylock, in The Merchant of Venice.

The next year Kendal rejoined her mother in Hull. There she played Lady Macbeth opposite Samuel Phelps. (Note: Kendal recalled in her memoirs that Phelps had not been at rehearsals and was taken aback to find himself playing opposite so young an actress. An alternative account of the matter was given by Archer, according to whom Phelps was to play opposite Margharetta but thought her too old to play Lady Macbeth, leading to Kendal's substituting for her mother.) In her brother T. W. Robertson's play Society, Kendal played Maud Hetherington, while her mother was Lady Ptarmigant. After Hull, Kendal went with her father to Liverpool, where she starred in Shakespeare, Sheridan and modern plays.

=== West End star ===
In April 1867 the Robertsons returned to London, where Kendal appeared at Drury Lane, playing Edith Fairlam in The Great City, and then at the Haymarket in E. A. Sothern's company, appearing with him in Our American Cousin, Brother Sam, David Garrick and A Hero of Romance, and playing leading roles in two other productions there. At the opening of John Hollingshead's Gaiety Theatre in December 1868 she played Florence in On the Cards, a comedy adapted from the French; she also appeared there as Lady Clara Vere de Vere in Dreams in 1869, before rejoining the Haymarket company, at this point on tour under the management of J. B. Buckstone. She played Viola, Rosalind, Lady Teazle, Kate Hardcastle and Lydia Languish.

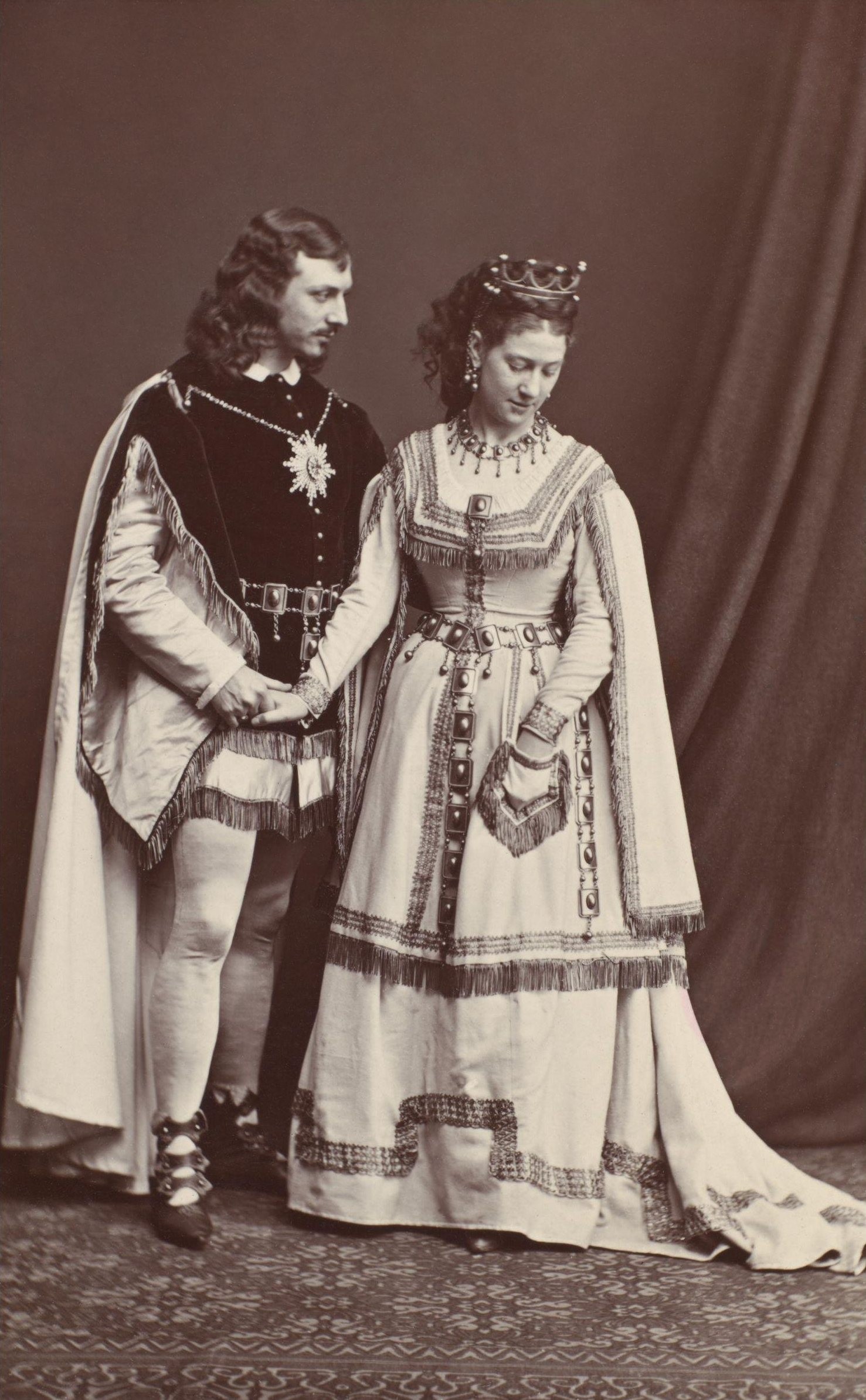
The Kendals as Philamir and Zeolide in W. S. Gilbert's The Palace of Truth (1870)

When the Haymarket company returned to London, Kendal remained with it; a fellow member was William Hunter Grimston, who acted under the stage name W. H. Kendal. The two were married on 7 August 1869. She adopted his stage surname, (Note: The professional change of surname was not immediate. "Madge Robertson" or "Miss Robertson" is reported as a member of the Haymarket company in The Era and other newspapers well into the 1870s. One headline, from November 1874, refers to "Mr and Mrs Kendal" while the text of the article calls her "Miss Madge Robertson". By late 1875 and early 1876 The Era and other papers were referring to "Mrs Kendal" in their reviews.) and after their marriage they almost always appeared in the same productions. They remained at the Haymarket until the end of 1874, during which period she played the four parts listed above and seventeen other leading roles. Among the new plays in which she starred were a series of "fairy comedies" by W. S. Gilbert: The Palace of Truth (1870, as Princess Zeolide), Pygmalion and Galatea (1871, as Galatea), and The Wicked World (1873, as Selene); in Gilbert's drama Charity (1874) she played Mrs Van Brugh.

The Haymarket company disbanded in late 1874, and the Kendals then set up their own tour beginning in Birmingham in November. For six consecutive nights they appeared there in Romeo and Juliet, The Lady of Lyons, The Hunchback, As You Like It, East Lynne, Uncle's Will and Weeds. Back in London in early 1875, they played Kate Hardcastle and Young Marlowe in She Stoops to Conquer at the Opera Comique, and went on to the Gaiety in As You Like It; the reviewer in The Athenaeum wrote, "One side of the character of Rosalind is shown by Mrs Kendal with admirable clearness and point. So suited to her style are the bantering speeches Shakespeare has put into the mouth of Rosalind, they might almost have been written for her", although the same critic missed "the underlying tenderness that more emotional artists are able to present."

The Kendals joined the actor John Hare at the Court Theatre in March 1875, opening in a new comedy, Lady Flora. Hare had a comic character role, and the Kendals played the romantic leads, Flora and Harry Armytage. She went on to play Mrs Fitzroy in Hamilton Aide's A Nine Days' Wonder, and then Lady Hilda in Gilbert's fairy comedy, Broken Hearts. She played Susan Hartley (a part she reprised in several later revivals) in Palgrave Simpson's adaptation of a French comedy, called A Scrap of Paper. In September 1876 the Kendals moved to the Prince of Wales's Theatre under the management of the Bancrofts. There Kendal played Lady Ormond in Peril, a carefully anglicised French comedy. She subsequently played Clara Douglas in Money, Lady Gay Spanker in London Assurance and Dora in Sardou's Diplomacy, the last of which played for twelve months, in London and on tour. The Kendals returned to the Court, where they revived A Scrap of Paper in January 1879. In February, in her brother T. W. Robertson's adaptation from the French, The Ladies' Battle, the Kendals played the Countess d'Autreval and her suitor, Gustave; in April she played Kate Greville in The Queen's Shilling, an adaptation of an old French comedy by Jean-François Bayard.

=== St James's Theatre: 1879–1888 ===
The Kendals in Burnett's Young Folks at the St James's, 1883

Since its inception in 1835 the St James's, in an unfashionable part of the West End, had acquired a reputation as an unlucky theatre, and more money had been lost than made by successive managements. (Note: The theatre had attracted this label as early as 1839: "this very beautiful but most unlucky theatre", and it continued throughout most of the 19th century: "an establishment long reputed the most unfortunate in London (1859); "this seemingly ill-fated place of amusement" (1875); "an unlucky one; its capacity was so small that [it did not pay] even with full houses" (1888); and even after the Hare and Kendal years and into George Alexander's highly successful tenure between 1891 and 1918 the label was still familiar.) At the invitation of Lord Newry, the owner of the freehold of the theatre, the Kendals and John Hare jointly took over the management of the house in 1879. For the first time, the theatre's reputation was steadily defied. The new lessees aimed both to amuse and to improve public taste, and in the view of the theatre historian J. P. Wearing, they achieved their aim. Under their management the St James's staged twenty-one plays: seven were new British pieces, eight adaptations of French plays, and the rest were revivals. Their first production on 4 October 1879 was a revival of The Queen's Shilling. This was followed in December by Tennyson's The Falcon, based on the Decameron, in which the Kendals made considerable successes as Lady Giovanna and the Count.

Wearing regards The Money Spinner (1881) as of particular importance to this period of the theatre's history, being the first of several of A. W. Pinero's plays staged there by Hare and the Kendals. It was regarded as daringly unconventional and a risky venture, but it caught on with the public. Other plays by Pinero given by the Hare-Kendal management at the St James's were The Squire (1881), The Ironmaster (1884), Mayfair (1885) and The Hobby Horse (1886). B. C. Stephenson's comedy Impulse (1883) was a substantial success and was revived by public demand two months after the end of its first run. The reception of a rare excursion into Shakespeare, As You Like It (1885), was mixed. Hare's Touchstone was considered by some to be the worst ever seen, and W. H. Kendal's Orlando was mildly praised, whereas Kendal's Rosalind, which had always been one of her best-loved roles, was again well regarded. Among the company in these years the actresses included Fanny Brough, Helen Maud Holt and the young May Whitty; among their male colleagues were George Alexander, Allan Aynesworth, Albert Chevalier, Henry Kemble, William Terris, Brandon Thomas and Lewis Waller.

The Kendals, particularly W. H., became associated in the public mind with the transformation of the theatrical profession from disreputable to respectable. The actor-manager Herbert Tree said, "when I look at Kendal I know acting is the profession of a gentleman". The Kendals imposed a high moral code on the members of their company both on stage and behind the scenes. Another commentator wrote, "Mrs Kendal, one of the best artists of her sex on the London stage, is in private life the epitome of all domestic virtues and graces". She was dubbed the "matron of the English theatre". Also during the St James's years she learned of the case of Joseph Merrick, referred to as the Elephant Man. Although she probably never met him in person, she helped to raise funds and public sympathy for him. In February 1887 the Kendals gave a command performance of Gilbert's play Sweethearts for Queen Victoria at Osborne House, the first such entertainment at a royal residence since Prince Albert's death more than twenty years earlier.

=== American tours ===
The Kendals in Pinero's The Ironmaster as Phillipe Derblay and Claire de Beaupré

After a farewell season of revivals of their greatest successes the St James's partnership with Hare came to an end in 1889. The Kendals went on a short provincial tour, and later in the year they set out on their first American appearance, making their debut at the Fifth Avenue Theatre in New York with A Scrap of Paper, in October 1889. The New York Dramatic Mirror reported:

Everybody attended the American debut of Mr and Mrs Kendal … that is to say everybody that could get seats or standing room. … The reports of Mrs Kendal's skill as a comedienne were not exaggerated. Her art is as fine as old point lace, and yet it is laid upon a temperament so genuinely sympathetic and so pliant and transitional that there is no sign of effort, no direct exhibition of method in anything she does.

At the same theatre the Kendals also presented The Ironmaster, to comparable popular and critical approval. After a brief return to London they set off on a second and more extensive American tour with a larger repertoire. From October 1891 to May 1892 they made what they billed as their third and last American tour, playing in a total of thirty-five cities. They reappeared on the London stage at the Avenue Theatre from January 1893 in a repertory of four plays, and then toured the English provinces, adding to their repertoire The Second Mrs Tanqueray, which had recently premiered in London starring Mrs Patrick Campbell. The critic William Archer compared the two actresses in the title role:

What of Mrs Kendal's reading of the part of Paula? It is the work of an accomplished comedienne who has at her command all the resources of her art. Comparisons are odious, and I do not propose to compare Mrs Kendal with Mrs Patrick Campbell except on one point. She certainly puts a greater depth of feeling into the later acts, and on the whole (I should say) she does rightly.

The Kendals then took the play to the US, where self-appointed guardians of morality condemned it, and audiences flocked to see it. During the Kendals' fifth and last tour of the US, from September 1894 to May 1895, they visited more than forty cities, presenting The Second Mrs Tanqueray, Lady Clancarty, Still Waters Run Deep, A Scrap of Paper, All for Her and The Ironmaster.

=== Later years ===
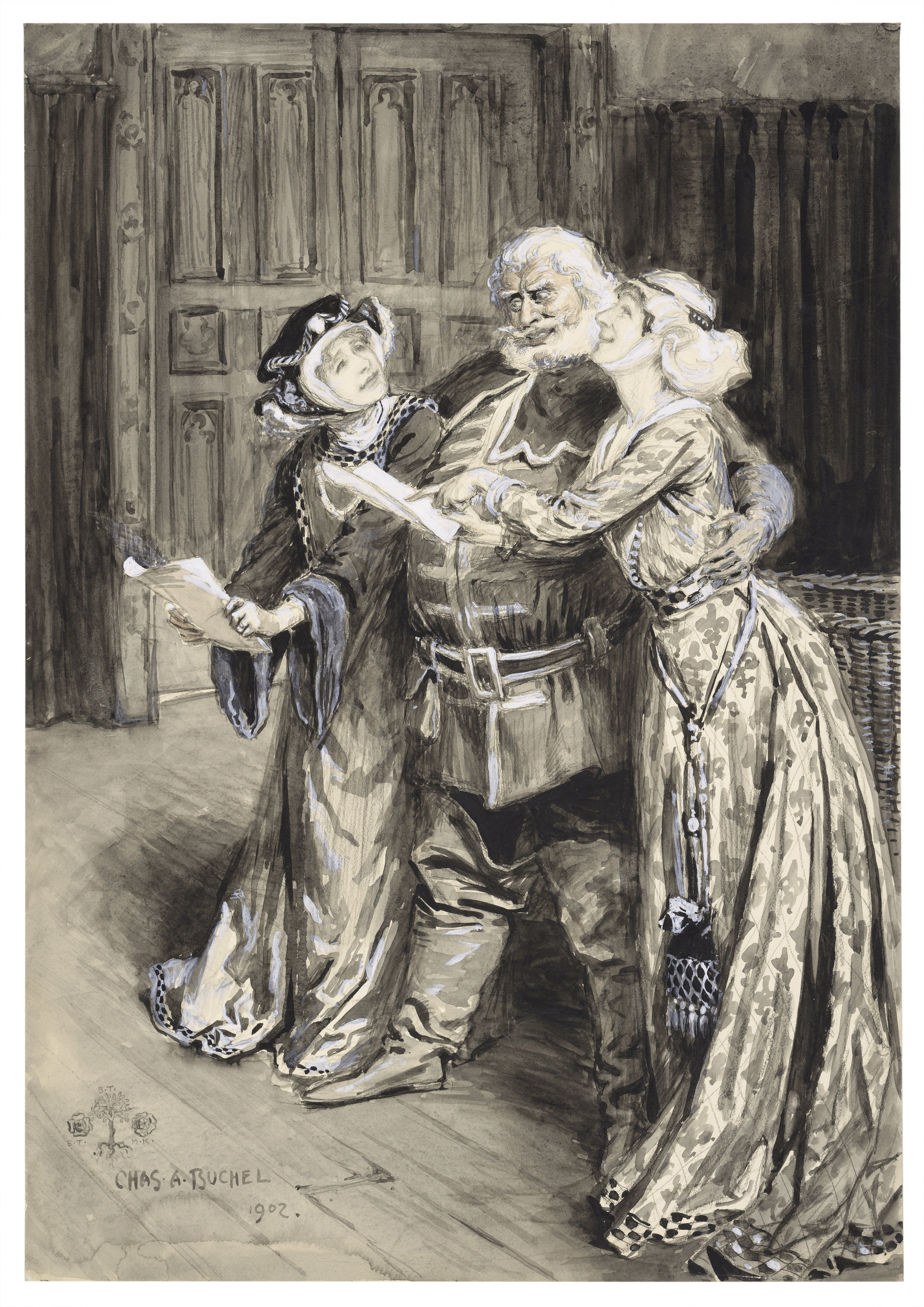
Herbert Tree's 1902 production of The Merry Wives of Windsor with Tree as Falstaff, Ellen Terry (l.) as Mistress Page and Kendal as Mistress Ford

On the Kendals' return to the West End critics and audiences welcomed them back enthusiastically. In June 1896 Bernard Shaw wrote:

Mrs Kendal should really be more cautious than she was at the Garrick on Wednesday night. When you feed a starving castaway you do not give him a full meal at once: you accustom him gradually to food by giving him small doses of soup. Mrs Kendal, forgetting that London playgoers have been starved for years in the matter of acting, inconsiderately gave them more in the first ten minutes than they have had in the last five years, with the result that the poor wretches became hysterical, and vented their applause in sobs and shrieks.

Shaw judged that "her finish of execution, her individuality and charm of style, her appetisingly witty conception of her effects, her mastery of her art and of herself [make] her still supreme among English actresses in high comedy". The biographer Richard Foulkes writes that the supremacy of which Shaw wrote was put to the test when Tree invited Kendal and Ellen Terry to appear together in The Merry Wives of Windsor, as Mistress Ford and Mistress Page respectively, at His Majesty's Theatre in 1902. This was the first time Kendal appeared in a production without W. H. Kendal since their marriage, and Foulkes speculates that her "unwonted exuberance and apparent spontaneity" may have been attributable to that fact. The Kendals continued to appear in popular plays without interruption until 1908, when they both retired, though she briefly emerged from retirement to reprise her Mistress Ford at the coronation gala of 1911 at His Majesty's. In 1924 she made her first radio broadcast, opposite Viola Tree, in Granny's Juliet, and she later took the title part of her ancestor, Sarah Siddons, in a comedy, A Lesson from Mrs Siddons, together with other descendants of Mrs. Siddons, in a radio broadcast on 28 November 1931 to mark the centenary of Siddons' death on the day that Tree took over her role.

The Kendals had at least six children. Two died young, and the Kendals became estranged from four others. John Gielgud believed the blame lay with the parents, and reports Kendal as reproaching herself shortly before her death. W. H. Kendal died in 1917: his widow attributed his death to a broken heart caused by the scandal of their daughter Margaret's divorce. In retirement, Kendal became active with many theatre charities, becoming president of the actors' retirement home, Denville Hall. She was appointed Dame Commander of the Order of the British Empire (DBE) in 1926. In December 1927 she presented the first award of the Kendal prize at the Royal Academy of Dramatic Arts to actress Joyce Bland. Kendal was awarded the freedom of her native town, Grimsby, in 1932, the first woman to receive that honour.

Kendal died at her home in Chorleywood, Hertfordshire, in 1935, aged 87, after a long illness. She was buried at St Marylebone cemetery in East Finchley.

== In fiction ==
Kendal is a featured character in the 1979 play The Elephant Man and the unrelated 1980 film of the same name, both based on the life of Joseph Merrick. In the film, she was portrayed by Anne Bancroft, whom Gielgud (who also appeared in the film) thought beautiful but quite unsuited to the role: "Mrs Kendal would be turning somersaults in her grave".

== Reputation ==
Gielgud wrote that many people, including James Agate, the leading critic of the time, "considered Madge Kendal the finest actress in England, a mistress of comedy and domestic drama even surpassing Ellen Terry". (Gielgud, who was born in 1904, was less sure of her excellence as a Shakespearean actress.) Agate rated her above Edith Evans and Marie Tempest and in the same league as Ellen Terry, Mrs Patrick Campbell and Sybil Thorndike. The Manchester Guardian's obituary was headed "Dame Madge Kendal: The Most Accomplished Actress of Her Generation", but an unflattering reference in The Times's obituary caused protests. The anonymous writer commented:

A very unhistrionic coldness of temperament and a superficiality of thought were the barriers between her acting and any form of greatness; and her rare adventures into the more exacting plays of the modern drama (The Second Mrs. Tanqueray was one of them) left the audience cold.

This drew immediate responses; a colleague, F. Forbes-Robertson, wrote:

Madge Kendal was undoubtedly our greatest comedian; she was the first to interpret her art in a modern spirit – the first to be untheatrical, unsentimental – attainments described by your critic as "coldness of temperament and superficiality of thought". Surely a flagrantly indiscriminate summary of the subtle, sensitive acting of this great comedian. That she failed in the second-rate neurotic drama The Second Mrs Tanqueray was due to her unsuitability for exaggerated histrionics.

St John Ervine wrote "Madge Kendal was an accomplished but not a great actress", but a "great comedienne". He praised her "verve … extraordinary vitality and her gaiety". Ervine considered that her husband's determination to be respectable hampered her artistic development. (Note: Ervine wrote that W.H. Kendal was not in his wife's class as an actor: "he was dull and pompous, both as a player and a private person, a solemn, sententious man whose heavy utterances were received by his wife as the most delicious sallies of wit; and he made a cult of respectability which, although it earned appreciation for him and his far abler wife, made them both disliked in many quarters.") In a 1986 study of great stage actors, Sheridan Morley wrote "Madge Kendal was the greatest comedienne of her generation"; he quoted a contemporary of Kendal: "I defy any other actress, living or dead, to get a laugh out of some of the poor lines with which Mrs Kendal simply rocked the house."

== Notes, references and sources ==
=== Sources ===
- Croall, Jonathan (2008). Sybil Thorndike. London: Haus. ISBN 978-1-905791-92-7.
- Duncan, Barry (1964). St James's Theatre, Its Strange and Complete History, 1835–1857. London: Barrie and Rockliff. OCLC 979694996.
- Gielgud, John (1979). An Actor and His Time. London: Sidgwick and Jackson. ISBN 978-0-283-98573-7.
- Gielgud, John (2000). Gielgud on Gielgud. London: Hodder and Stoughton. ISBN 978-0-340-79502-6.
- Kendal, Madge (1933). Rudolph De Cordova (ed.). Dame Madge Kendal by Herself. London: John Murray. OCLC 2325826.
- Morley, Sheridan (1986). The Great Stage Stars. London: Angus & Robertson. ISBN 978-0-8160-1401-9.
- Parker, John, ed. (1922). Who's Who in the Theatre (fourth ed.). London: Sir Isaac Pitman and Sons. OCLC 473894893.
- Pemberton, T. Edgar (1900). The Kendals: A Biography. London: Pearson. OCLC 684413482.
- Shaw, Bernard (1928). Dramatic Opinions and Essays. New York: Brentano. OCLC 786136429.
- Stedman, Jane (1996). W. S. Gilbert, A Classic Victorian and His Theatre. Oxford: Oxford University Press. ISBN 978-0-19-816174-5.
- Wright, Neil R. (2016). Treading the Boards: Actors and Theatres in Georgian Lincolnshire. Lincoln: Society for Lincolnshire History & Archaeology. ISBN 978-0-90-358255-1.
