= Broken Hearts =

Play by W. S. Gilbert

Broken Hearts is a blank verse play by W. S. Gilbert in three acts styled "An entirely original fairy play". It opened at the Royal Court Theatre in London on 9 December 1875, running for three months, and toured the provinces in 1876. It was revived at the Savoy Theatre in 1882 (with Gilbert playing Florian, alongside Hermann Vezin as Mousta, after an accident incapacitated the actor who was originally to have played Florian). Julia Gwynne played Melthusine. It was revived again in 1883, and yet again in 1888 starring Marion Terry in February and Julia Neilson in May, and also at Crystal Palace that year. There was also a New York City production at the Madison Square Theatre.

== Background and analysis ==
Broken Hearts was the last of several blank verse "fairy comedies" created by Gilbert in the early 1870s starring William Hunter Kendal and his wife Madge Robertson Kendal (sister of the playwright Tom Robertson). These plays, influenced by the fairy work of James Planché, are founded upon the idea of self-revelation by characters under the influence of magic or some supernatural interference. The first was the fantasy The Palace of Truth in 1870. Pygmalion and Galatea, a satire of sentimental, romantic attitudes toward myth, was produced in 1871. Together, these plays, and successors such as The Wicked World (1873), Sweethearts (1874), Charity and Broken Hearts, did for Gilbert on the dramatic stage what the German Reed Entertainments had done for him on the musical stage, establishing that his capabilities extended far beyond burlesque. They won him artistic credentials as a writer of wide range, who was as comfortable with human drama as with farcical humour.

Broken Hearts is one of several Gilbert plays, including The Wicked World, Princess Ida, Fallen Fairies and Iolanthe, where the introduction of males into a tranquil world of women brings "mortal love" that wreaks havoc with the peaceful status quo. Stedman calls this a "Gilbertian invasion plot". The play examines both human frailties: vanity, misplaced trust, judging by appearance; and human virtues: pity, love, and sacrifice. Some of the play's themes and plot devices resurface in Gilbert and Sullivan's The Yeomen of the Guard and Princess Ida. Here, as in many of Gilbert's plays, we feel Gilbert's distrust of "heroes" in Florian's casual arrogance and cruelty, but we also see the character's real chivalry.

Gilbert wrote Broken Hearts for his friend, John Hare of the Court Theatre. He worked on the play for much of 1875 and said that he had "invested a great part of himself" in the work. Hare generally directed the plays that he starred in, and Gilbert preferred to direct the plays that he wrote. Therefore, the two men, both quick-tempered, clashed at rehearsals of Broken Hearts. Gilbert sent an advance copy of the script to his old friend, the critic Clement Scott, who was then the editor of The Theatre. Scott indicated that he was pleased with the play. Gilbert wrote to Scott, "I am delighted to think that you like the piece so much. I have been so often told that I am devoid of a mysterious quality called 'sympathy' that I determined in this piece to do my best to show that I could pump it up if necessary." Later, however, Scott quoted a joke by F. C. Burnand about going to see "Broken Parts". Gilbert was hurt and called Scott's remark "Most offensive, and likely to cause a great deal of injury to my play."

The play opened on 9 December 1875, running for three months until 10 March 1875, receiving around 79 performances. It was generally well reviewed, although it did not catch on with audiences and was not a financial success, but it remained one of Gilbert's two favourites among all the plays he had written (the other was Gretchen, an adaptation of the Faust legend). Later, Gilbert had a line from the play engraved on the sun-dial at his home, Grim's Dyke: "even Time is hastening to its end."

At the time Broken Hearts was written, Gilbert and Sullivan had already produced their hit one-act comic opera Trial by Jury as well as their burlesque-style opera, Thespis, and their producer Richard D'Oyly Carte was seeking funding to bring them together again. But funding was slow in coming, and both Gilbert and Arthur Sullivan were still producing a considerable amount of work separately: Gilbert produced two other plays that year, for instance. However, four years after Broken Hearts, H.M.S. Pinafore would become such a runaway hit that Gilbert would only produce five theatrical works away from Sullivan in the eleven years following.

== Synopsis ==
Act I

On a tropical island in the 14th century, a group of noblewomen have fled the world, their hearts having been broken through the loss of their lovers. They vow to love no living thing, but they have transferred their loves to inanimate objects: Lady Vavir loves a sundial (a symbol of mortality), and her sister, Lady Hilda, loves a fountain (a symbol of vitality), and Melusine loves a hand mirror. Lady Vavir is a delicate girl and fears that she hasn't much longer to live. The only male allowed on the island is their servant Mousta, "a deformed ill-favoured dwarf, hump-backed and one-eyed" and therefore no threat to their maidenhood. Mousta is trying to practice magic from a book he has found, hoping to make himself handsome, for he desires to love and be loved.

Prince Florian arrives on the island. He has a magic veil of invisibility, and Mousta schemes to get it, as he hopes that it would help him woo a woman. Vavir comes to bid good-night to her sundial. Florian listens, concealed by the veil. Vavir concludes by wishing that the fountain had the power of speech to speak its love. Florian, amused by the situation, answers for it, much to Vavir's amazement and joy. He weaves a tale of being a man enchanted into the sundial, who will be released if a maiden would love it truly for a year and a day. He also gives voice to Melusine's hand mirror. As the ladies exit, he is greatly amused at the effect his joke has on them.

Hilda has come to bid her fountain good-night, and Florian is overwhelmed by her beauty in the moonlight. She tells it of the love she had lost: a certain Prince Florian, but how it (so far as it could) has taken his place in her heart. Florian then speaks through the fountain, telling her he loves her, but wondering what she would do if this Prince Florian should be alive after all. She tell him (as the fountain) that it would be an unbearable, but impossible joy: he (the fountain) should be content for she has pledged herself to him forever. But neither of them realise that Mousta has overheard this vow.

Act II

Mousta has been able to steal the veil of invisibility. Now, without the veil, Vavir finds Florian. She recognises his voice as that of the sundial, and believing him to be its disenchanted spirit, pours out her love for him, much to Florian's dismay. Not knowing how to tell her he doesn't love her, and recognising that the blow would kill her, he sends her away with a promise to return presently.

Lady Hilda has come to tell her fountain about Vavir's now-incarnate lover, and begs it, if it can, to take human form. Mousta, now with the veil, answers for the fountain, telling her that he can take such form, but fears if he does, she will despise him. He is roughly-hewn, ugly: much like their wretched serving-man. Hilda reassures the "spirit of the fountain" that she has loved him for his generous spirit, not his appearance. The "fountain" presses her for a token. She casts her ring in the pool, pledging to be his bride. Mousta takes the ring and reveals himself. Hilda is stunned with horror and amazement. Mousta confesses a genuine love for her goodness and generosity. She wheedles from him the veil of invisibility. Putting it on, she violently scorns him: she will keep her promise to be his bride, but he will never see her again. Wrapped in the veil, she exits, to Mousta's eloquent despair.

Florian returns, looking for Hilda. In response to his harsh questioning, Mousta tells him that she is missing; she must have his stolen veil. Hilda returns, unseen, and is amazed to see Florian arguing with Mousta. After his departure, she prepares to reveal herself to Florian, but is stopped by Vavir's arrival. Love has given her new strength and new hope; and only makes Florian's duty harder to perform. He tells her a story of a knight who met a gentle young girl. As a thoughtless joke, he spoke words of love to her, not realising she would believe them. Vavir gradually realises he is speaking of her; and Hilda learns that Florian loves her. As he finishes, Vavir recites the end of his story: the girl pardoned him and died. As Hilda prays for her sister's strength, Florian pleads with her that the girl must live, but Vavir collapses in his arms.

Act III

About a half-hour before sunset, Melusine and Amanthis watch as Vavir sleeps at the foot of the sundial. The others have left to look for the missing Hilda and Florian. Vavir confesses that she fears to die without seeing Hilda again. Hilda reveals herself, and Vavir tells her how much Florian loves her, apologising for having loved him. Hilda tells Vavir that the prince had been sent to the island to save her life with his love. If Hilda disappears, she reasons, he would soon forget her.

Upon Florian's return, Vavir reveals that Hilda loves him and is nearby. Florian realises that Hilda has the missing veil. Mousta tells Florian the truth and that Mousta received the token of her pledge to be his wife. He mocks Florian's misery at losing her – at their both losing her. Florian flies at Mousta in a fit of jealousy, prepared to wreak fatal vengeance on him. Mousta doesn't protest; he wants to die but asks Florian if the two of them were evenly matched rivals. Florian's wrath dies, and he releases Mousta, apologising for his harshness. Mousta is stunned by his mercy, and gives him Hilda's ring before exiting.

In hopes that she will hear him, Florian announces he has her pledge and that she has nothing to fear. Hilda does reveal herself and begs him to save Vavir's life with his love. No man can so direct his heart, but Florian agrees to try. However, it is too late. Vavir returns, supported by the other two ladies. Hilda pleads with Vavir, and Death itself, for her life. But Vavir is prepared to die.

== Roles and original cast ==
- Prince Florian – W. H. Kendal
- Mousta (A Deformed Dwarf) – G. W. Anson
- The Lady Hilda – Madge Kendal
- The Lady Vavir (Her Sister) – Miss Hollingshead
- The Lady Melusine – Miss Plowden
- The Lady Amanthis – Miss Rorke
