= The Silver Shield =

1885 play by Sydney Grundy

The Silver Shield is a comedy in three acts by playwright Sydney Grundy that was first produced on May 19, 1885, under the direction of Amy Roselle at London’s Royal Strand Theatre. The play was first produced in New York on January 6, 1891 at the Madison Square Theatre by the Rosina Vokes Company.

== Synopsis ==
From The Academy, 1885

The tale, to tell the truth, is somewhat improbable. It deals with certain crises in the lives of two married couples who were, on the whole, unfortunate. In one case the lady has separated from the gentleman through having misunderstood the contents of a letter; and in the other case the gentleman has separated from the lady on grounds equally sufficient—it has been his ill luck to discover, with apprehension, only the' one-half of a document, the remaining half of which would have set his fears at rest. In so strange a coincidence some improbability may surely be seen, but it is heightened by the relations that are made to exist between the two couples: for the wife whose letter had been misunderstood by her husband is supposed to be enamored of the gentleman whose letter had been misunderstood by his wife. The intrigue, such as it is, is ingenious, but the complications obtained are those proper to the theatre, and, to say the least, infrequent in the world. Nor, perhaps, are such deficiencies as the comedy displays the less observable because the dialogue is often conducted with genuine wit.

== Reception ==
A review in The Athenaeum, 1885, was as follows:

Of many experiments recently made at morning performances the production of Mr. Sydney Grundy's comedy The Silver Shield is the most hopeful. It is doubtful, indeed, whether since the early plays of Mr. Albery any work of the same class has obtained an equally favourable reception. Some farcical comedies have met with no less cordial welcome. From a farcical comedy, however, to a genuine comedy, such as The Silver Shield claims to be, is a long step. Mr. Grundy's dialogue is not only amusing—it has the immeasurably higher quality of appropriateness; his characters are true to themselves, and are not mere victims of circumstance; his mirth has an underlying suggestion of pathos; and his work has literary quality. In these respects it stands above most successful effort of recent days. Now and then Mr. Grundy stoops to the Byronic style of workmanship, and introduces a joke which is inconsistent and improbable. When, for instance, concerning a half finished dinner which the guests hurriedly leave, one of the characters says, "It can wait," Mr. Grundy unworthily makes another add, "The servants could not." Offences of this kind are few, and in one or two passages the language is genuinely happy and worthy to be remembered. The plot is open to objection. It is thin, and seems at one point to be going to pieces. That it escapes from so doing is due to highly ingenious treatment, the result of which is that the end is brilliant. A suspicion of artifice is, however, suggested. Add to this that the plot deals with details of the behind-scenes life of the theatre, which, whatever their success with the exceptional audiences attracted to a first representation, are not calculated to appeal to a more promiscuous public, and the chief elements of weakness are indicated. These will probably be surmounted by the animal spirits of the play, the ingenuity of its complications, and the cleverness of the characterization. The fear whether the whole is not, like a clever toy, too brittle, seems dispelled by the fact that the characters are at once amusing and natural. Mr. Grundy owes much to his exponents. It is difficult to fancy acting brighter or more effective than that of Miss Amy Roselle and Mr. Groves, or more touching than that of Mies Kate Eorke, who at one point attained a hold over the audience such as a girl of her age has rarely achieved. Mr. Beauchamp, Mr. Rutland Barrington, Mr. Dacre, Mr. Herbert, and Mrs. Leigh Murray were also good, and the performance as a whole had a commendable ensemble.

From The Academy, 1885

That is all we have to say about the acting. The Silver Shield is quite worth seeing. Brilliantly written as it is, we doubt if there is substance enough in the story, or originality enough in the characters, for it to last in literature; but it can hardly be denied a fair theatrical success, and such success will be thoroughly well deserved. It will amuse very much.

== Roles and principal casts ==
London and New York casts:

- Sir Humphrey Chetwynd:
  - John Beauchamp
  - Charles J. Bell
- Dr. Dyonisius Dozy:
  - Rutland Barrington
  - Felix Morris
- Tom Potter:
  - Arthur Dacre
  - Courtenay Thorpe
- Ned Chetwynd:
  - W. Herbert
  - Grant Stewart
- Dodson Dick:
  - C. Groves
  - Ferdinand Gottschalk
- Alma Blake:
  - Amy Roselle
  - Rosina Vokes
- Mrs. Dozy:
  - Leigh Murray
  - Miss Woods
- Lucy Preston:
  - Kate Rorke
  - Emily Bancker
- Susan:
  - Julia Roselle
  - Eleanor Lane
- Wilson:
  - L. Lavender
  - Marion Kilby
