= The Palace of Truth =

1870 play by W. S. Gilbert

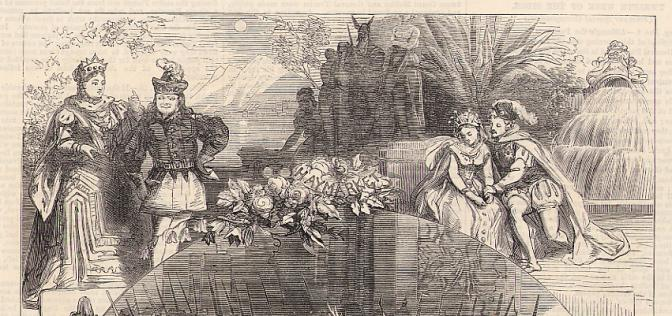
Drawing of a scene from the play in The Illustrated London News, 1870

The Palace of Truth is a three-act blank verse "Fairy Comedy" by W. S. Gilbert first produced at the Haymarket Theatre in London on 19 November 1870, adapted in significant part from Madame de Genlis's fairy story, Le Palais de la vérité. The play ran for about 140 performances, toured the British provinces and enjoyed revivals well into the 20th century. A New York production followed in 1910.

After more than a century of inquiry, researchers in 2012 concluded that the three genera of Lemurs were named after characters in The Palace of Truth in 1870 by British zoologist John Edward Gray.

== Background ==
Gilbert created several blank verse "fairy comedies" at the Haymarket Theatre for actor-manager John Baldwin Buckstone and starring William Hunter Kendal and his wife Madge Robertson Kendal (sister of the playwright Tom Robertson) in the early 1870s. These plays, influenced by the fairy works of James Planché, are founded upon the idea of self-revelation by characters under the influence of some magic or supernatural interference. The Palace of Truth was the first of these, followed by Pygmalion and Galatea (1871), a satire of sentimental, romantic attitudes toward myth, The Wicked World (1873) and Broken Hearts (1875). At the same time, Gilbert wrote some dramas, including Sweethearts (1874) and Charity (1874), all of which helped to establish his artistic credentials as a writer of wide range, who was as comfortable with human drama as with the comedies for which he is most famous.

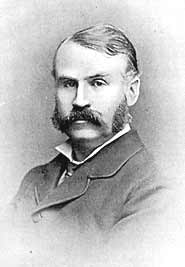
W.S. Gilbert in about 1870

Although The Palace of Truth has substantial comic elements, it has the structure and feel of a drama. The play was one of Gilbert's most successful works prior to his collaboration with Arthur Sullivan. The play ran for approximately 140 performances at the Haymarket, a long run at the time, and then toured. Gilbert was paid 4 guineas per night until February 1871 and 2 guineas thereafter. On tour, Gilbert's royalty was 3 guineas a night.

Some of Gilbert's later works drew on The Palace of Truth for plot elements or their logical development, including his hit play, Engaged (1877), where characters say openly what would ordinarily be hidden and admit what, in Victorian society, would be inadmissible. Gilbert and Edward German discussed making The Palace of Truth into an opera, but after the failure of Fallen Fairies, the idea was abandoned.

Some of the satire of the piece is aimed at musicians. An exchange in the piece, where the character of Zoram, the court composer and a poseur, makes the following complicated musical remark, was tried out by Gilbert on his future collaborator, Arthur Sullivan, some months before the play was produced (Gilbert had looked up the definition of "harmony" in the Encyclopædia Britannica and translated it into blank-verse, as follows):

Believe me, the result would be the same,
Whether your lordship chose to play upon
The simple tetrachord of Mercury
That knew no diatonic intervals,
Or the elaborate dis‑diapason
(Four tetrachords, and one redundant note),
Embracing in its perfect consonance
All simple, double and inverted chords!

== Roles and original cast ==
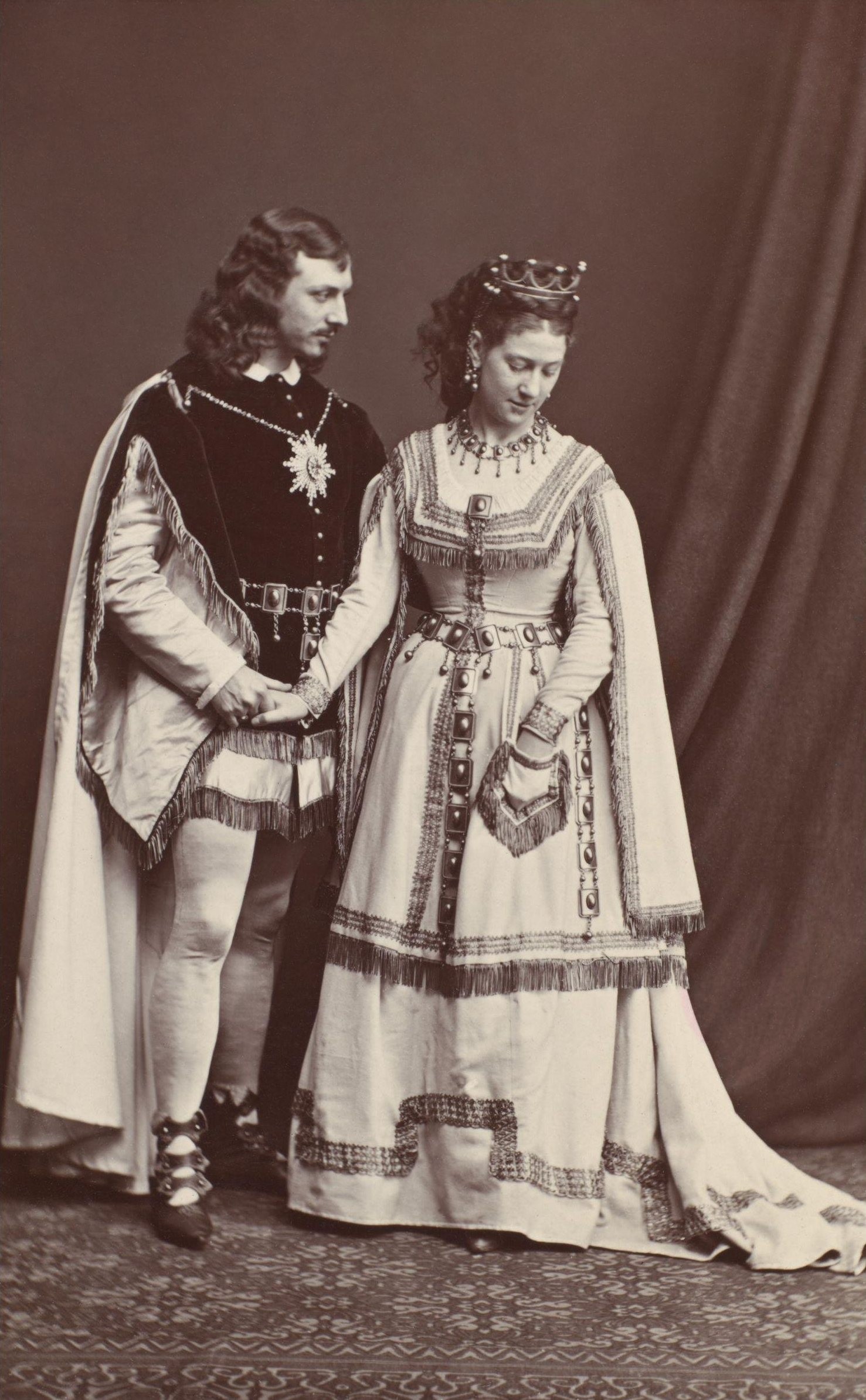
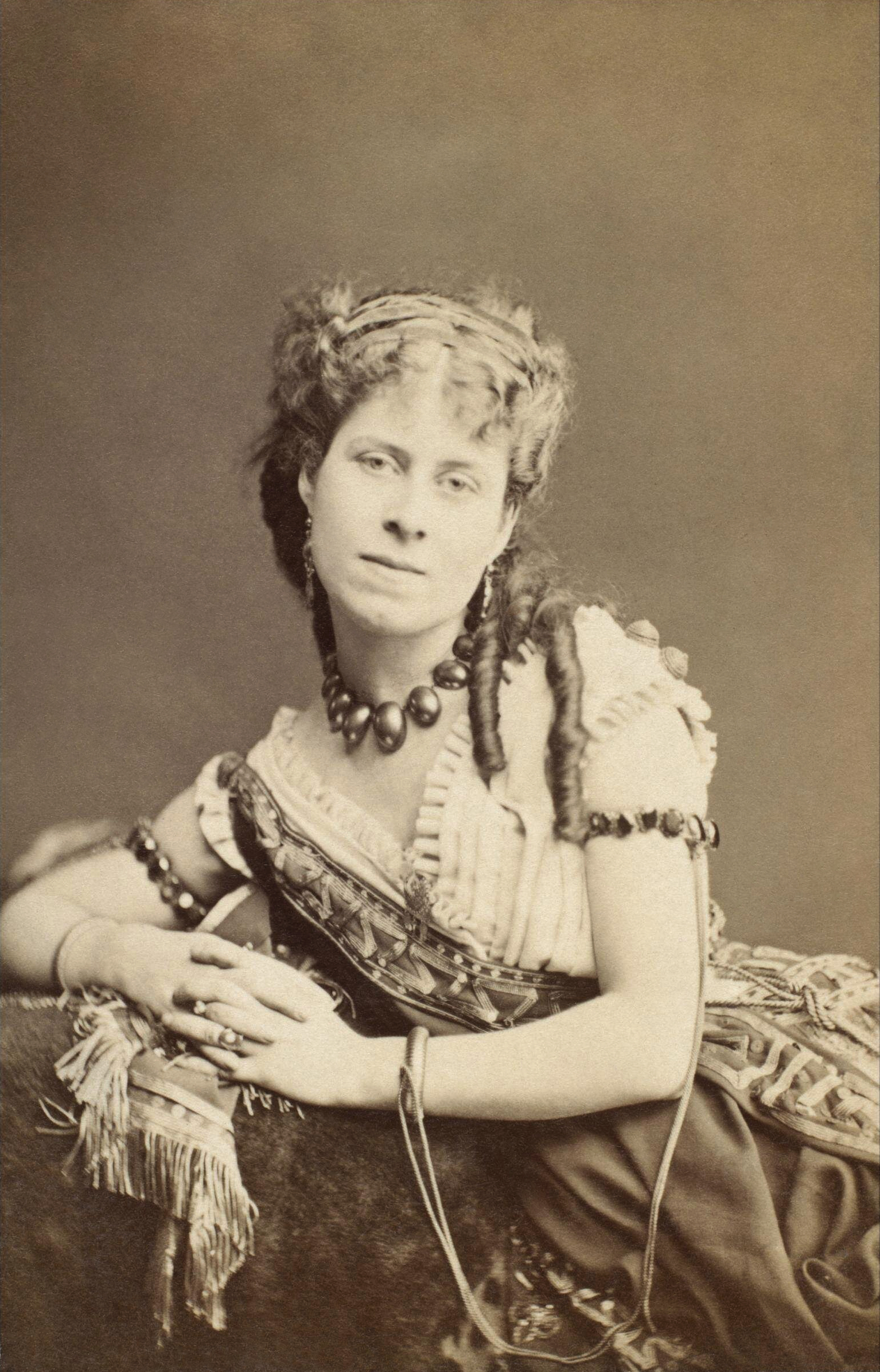
Left, W. H. Kendal as Prince Philamir and Madge Kendal as Zeolide. Right, Caroline Hill as Mirza. Original production (1870)
- King Phanor, a philanderer; likes "yes" men – J. B. Buckstone
- Prince Philamir, boyfriend of the Princess; speaks in alliteration – W. H. Kendal
- Chrysal, a "yes" man and a lyricist; betrothed to Palmis – Mr. Everill
- Zoram, another "yes" man and a composer – Mr. Clark
- Aristaeus, an outspoken and truthful man – Mr. Rogers
- Gelanor, steward of the Palace of Truth – Mr. Braid
- Queen Altemire, a good wife; wants her daughter to be happy – Mrs. Chippendale
- Princess Zeolide, young; searching for love and truth – Madge Kendal (billed as Miss Robertson)
- Mirza, a friend of the Princess; suspicious of the Prince – Caroline Hill
- Palmis, a lady of the court; in love with Chrysal – Fanny Wright
- Azema, timid; a visitor to the Palace of Truth – Fanny Gwynne

== Synopsis ==
Act I – The garden of the King's Country House.

The Queen is upset because the Princess is to become engaged tomorrow to the Prince but seems not to love him. The Prince speaks flowery words of love to the Princess. The Queen, jealous, wonders why the King visits the Palace of Truth once a month, while she has never been there in eighteen years of marriage. The King reveals that the palace is enchanted, and every visitor there is bound to speak the truth. The speaker is not aware that he is telling the truth, and it is impossible to keep a secret there. The two decide to bring the Prince and Princess there to find out if they truly love one another. They will also bring all the courtiers. The King tells Gelanor and Mirza that he has a talisman that will keep the holder from having to tell the truth.

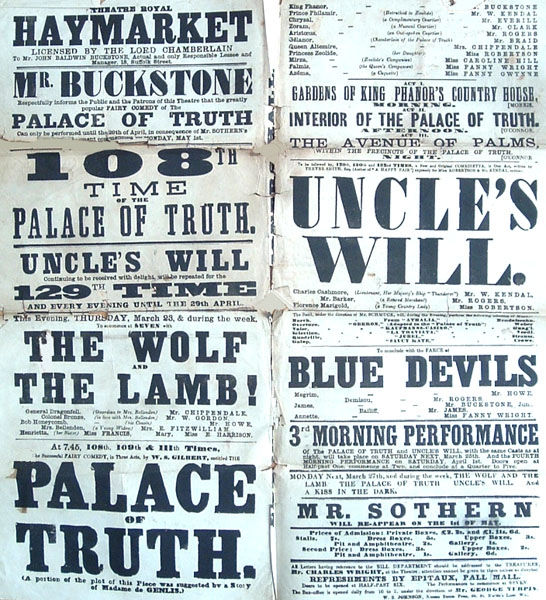
Poster for the play's 108th performance

Act II – Inside the Palace of Truth

The King is holding the talisman. Everyone else tells the truth: The Princess's singing is terrible; Chrysal did not mean one word that he said at court; Zoram (the composer) doesn't know one note from another, etc. Chrysal and Zoram declare a duel because of the truth they speak.

The Prince confesses that at least 500 ladies have kissed him, among other things, and of course the Princess is unhappy. Azema timidly reveals that she wants to try her charms on the Prince. The Prince rejects her, so Azema tries to charm Chrysal. The Prince decides that the palace must be enchanted and shows up human nature as it is and everybody is affected by it, but he doesn't realise that the enchantment affects him. He tells Mirza that he loves her and then reveals this to the Princess. She breaks their bond and gives him his freedom and then pleads with him to take her back and give her until that night. Other characters confess love for each other in strange pairings.

After the King reveals that he had sex with Mirza in the shrubbery and Mirza admits that she hates the King, he realises that his talisman is not working. Now the King wants to leave!

Act III – On the Avenue of Palms at night

Chrysal has a sword and is ready for the duel with Zoram. Zoram arrives, and the two combatants tell each other, with great bravado, how afraid they are of each other. Gelanor tells them that the Palace makes one say what he thinks. Zoram and Chrysal decide that thoughts are not important. They shake hands. The Queen talks with old Gelanor, and Azema goes to tell the King of this meeting.

The Princess begs Mirza to let her have the Prince, and Mirza says she will do so and then go away. She tells him of her love for him and adds that she is going away. The Princess reenters unobserved, and is moved by Mirza's speech. She goes forward and puts Mirza's hand in the Prince's and sets him free. The Prince gives Mirza a ring as a pledge of his love and wants one in return – a handkerchief or a glove. She brings forth a handkerchief from her pocket and the crystal talisman falls out. Mirza tells him that it is the talisman; she took it from the King and put the false one in its place.

The King arrives, and the Prince gives him the talisman. He tells the Queen she has been found with Gelanor. The Queen truthfully says that it was an innocent meeting. The Queen asks the King if he had been philandering with Azema and, because he has the talisman, he is able to lie, denying it. The Queen apologises. The Prince admits that he has been a fool. The King give the talisman to the Prince but he gives it to the Princess, speaks from his heart and kisses her. The Queen breaks the talisman, also ending the enchantment of the palace, and all note the lessons they have learned.
