= John Baldwin Buckstone =

English actor and playwright (1802–1879)

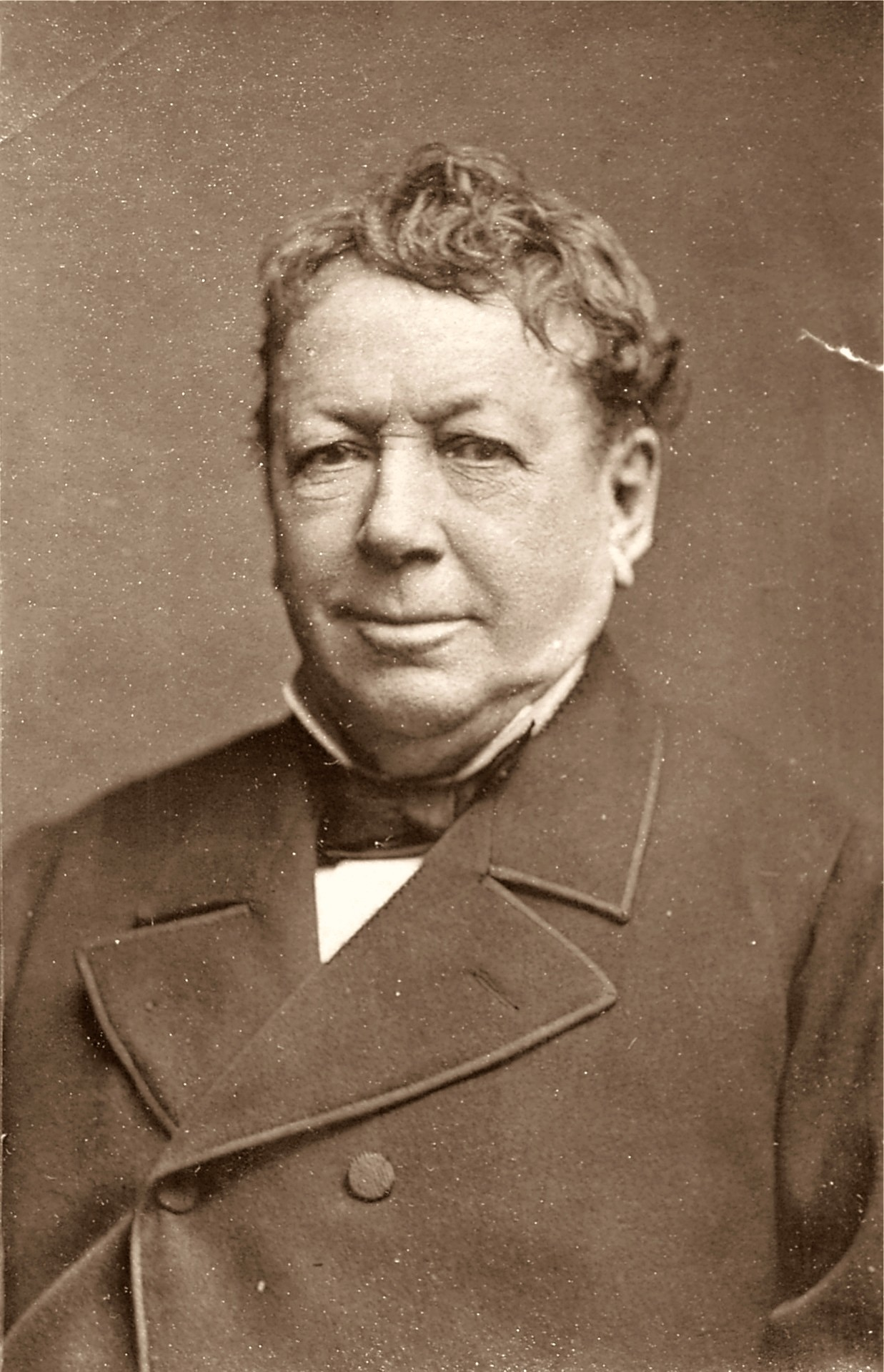
John Baldwin Buckstone

John Baldwin Buckstone (14 September 1802 – 31 October 1879) was an English actor, playwright and comedian who wrote 150 plays, the first of which was produced in 1826.

He starred as a comic actor during much of his career for various periods at the Adelphi Theatre and the Haymarket Theatre, managing the Haymarket from 1853 to 1877.

== Biography ==
Buckstone was born in Hoxton, London, the son of John Buckstone, a retired shopkeeper, and his wife Elizabeth (née Baldwin). He was educated at Walworth Grammar School and was briefly apprenticed on a naval ship at age 10 but returned to school. He studied law and was articled to a solicitor but turned to acting by age 19.

=== Early career ===
Buckstone first joined a travelling troupe in 1821 as Gabriel in The Children in the Wood. and toured for three years, mostly in the southeast of England. He found a mentor in Edmund Kean. He made his first London appearance, on 30 January 1823, at the Surrey Theatre, as Ramsay in The Fortunes of Nigel. In 1824 he joined that theatre and played Peter Smink in The Armistice with great success. He also began to write plays.

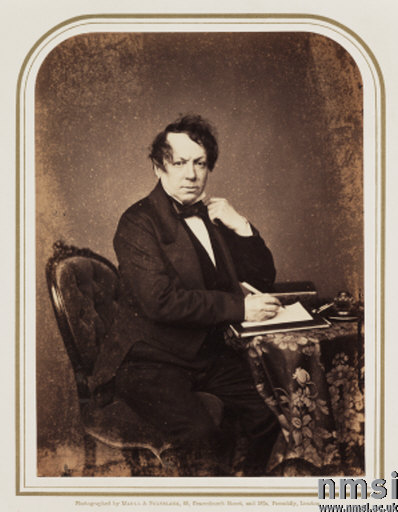
Portrait of Buckstone

His successes led to his engagement in 1827 at the Adelphi Theatre, where he remained as the leading low comedian until 1833. Buckstone's acting was described as "a union of shrewdness and drollery, with their interaction upon each other ... was irresistibly comic." Buckstone wrote most of his plays in the first half of his career, and many of these were produced at the Adelphi. As his acting career reached the height of its success, his playwriting output declined. At the Adelphi, he appeared as Bobby Trot in his first really successful play, the melodrama Luke the Labourer (1827), which he had written in 1826. Other well known plays were Wreck Ashore (1830) and Forgery (1832) Perhaps the most successful of these early plays was his 1833 play, The Bravo, based on James Fenimore Cooper's novel of the same name.

=== Peak years ===
He first appeared at the Haymarket Theatre during the summer season in 1833, also writing plays for this theatre, including Ellen Wartham (1833). Another hit for the Haymarket was the drama Thirty Years of a Woman's Life. At that theatre, his acting was praised in The Housekeeper by Douglas Jerrold (1833), Pyramus and Thisbe, and in his own plays, Uncle John, Rural Felicity and Agnes de Vere (all in 1834). He stayed at the Haymarket until 1838, producing The Dream at Sea among other plays.

In 1839–40 he returned to the Adelphi to write and star in a number of plays, including his extraordinarily successful play Jack Sheppard, based on the novel of the same name published that year by William Harrison Ainsworth. After his return from a visit to the United States in 1840, where he met with little success, Buckstone played in his own play, Married Life, at the Haymarket. He then appeared at several London theatres, among them the Lyceum, where he was Box at the first representation of Box and Cox, by John Maddison Morton, in 1847. There he also created the role of Bob, in Dion Boucicault's Old Heads and Young Hearts, and played several other memorable roles, including, Slowboy in Cricket on the Hearth, Dan in John Bull, MacDunnum of Dunnum in A School for Scheming, Scrub in The Beaux' Stratagem and Golightly in Lend Me Five Shillings, and several Shakespeare roles. For the Adelphi, he wrote The Green Bushes and The Flowers of the Forest, both in 1847. He also dramatised The Last Days of Pompeii.

For the Haymarket, in 1848, he wrote and played in An Alarming Sacrifice, Leap Year and A Serious Family. During this period, he memorably played Moses in Stirling Coyne's adaptation of The Vicar of Wakefield, Appleface in Jerrold's Catspaw, Shadowly Softhead in Lord Lytton's Not as Bad as We Seem and in many Shakespeare productions with Mr. and Mrs. Charles Kean.

=== Actor-manager of the Haymarket ===
Buckstone became lessee of the Haymarket from 1853 to 1877. For this theatre, he continued to write plays and farces, though fewer than before. As actor-manager of the Haymarket, he surrounded himself with an ensemble company, including Edward Askew Sothern, Henry Compton, Mr. and Mrs. Charles James Mathews and the Kendals. He produced the plays of James Planché, Thomas William Robertson, Tom Taylor, John Oxenford, H. J. Byron and W. S. Gilbert, as well as his own, and in most of these he acted. Buckstone's management made the Haymarket into the premier comedy theatre of the age. His own gifts as a comic actor contributed much to the theatre's remarkable success. According to The Times, "Few men... have possessed to a greater extent the power of communicating the spirit of mirth to an audience. ... He was helped, too, in his vocation by remarkable physical attributes" and a peculiar, hilarious voice.

In the 1850s, Buckstone produced An Unequal Match and Taylor's The Overland Route, A Hero of Romance by Westland Marston, and Home by Robertson. In 1861–1862, Buckstone produced a 314-night run of Our American Cousin, with Sothern in his most famous role as Lord Dundreary. Robertson's David Garrick was a hit in 1864, also with Sothern in the title role. Sothern also starred in H. J. Byron's An English Gentleman at the Haymarket in 1871. In 1868, Buckstone's son Frederick appeared at the theatre in Walter Gordon's farce Pay to the Bearer a Kiss. W. S. Gilbert premiered seven of his plays at the Haymarket during this time including his blank verse "fairy comedies" starring the Kendals, such as The Palace of Truth (1870), Pygmalion and Galatea (1871) and The Wicked World (1873). Buckstone also produced Gilbert's dramas, Charity (1874) and Dan'l Druce, Blacksmith (1876), as well as his 1877 farce Engaged. In 1873 Buckstone introduced the innovation of matinées starting at 2.00 pm. By the mid-1870s, however, Buckstone's company was disbanding, and in 1877, ill and bankrupt after sustaining heavy losses, he gave up management of the theatre.

=== Personal life, death and ghost ===
Buckstone was first married in 1828 to Anne Maria Honeyman, with whom he had at least five children before she died in 1844. Their son Frederick was an actor. For many years, Buckstone was closely associated with the actress Fanny Copeland Fitzwilliam, who was widowed in 1852 and whom he was engaged to marry in 1854. She died of cholera a month before the wedding. In 1857 Buckstone married Fanny's cousin Isabella Copeland, the great-niece of the theatre manager Robert Copeland, and they had 12 children between 1857 and 1876. Their daughter Lucy Isabella Buckstone and their sons John Copeland Buckstone and Rowland Buckstone also took to the stage.

After three years of ill health, Buckstone died at his home, Bell Green Lodge, in Lower Sydenham in 1879 at the age of 77 and was buried in Ladywell Cemetery.

According to director Nigel Everett and stagehands at the Haymarket Theatre, Buckstone's ghost has often been seen at the theatre, particularly during comedies and "when he appreciates things" playing there. In 2009, The Daily Telegraph reported that the actor Patrick Stewart saw the ghost standing in the wings during a performance of Waiting for Godot at the Haymarket.
