= William Hunter Kendal =

English actor and theatre manager (1843–1917)

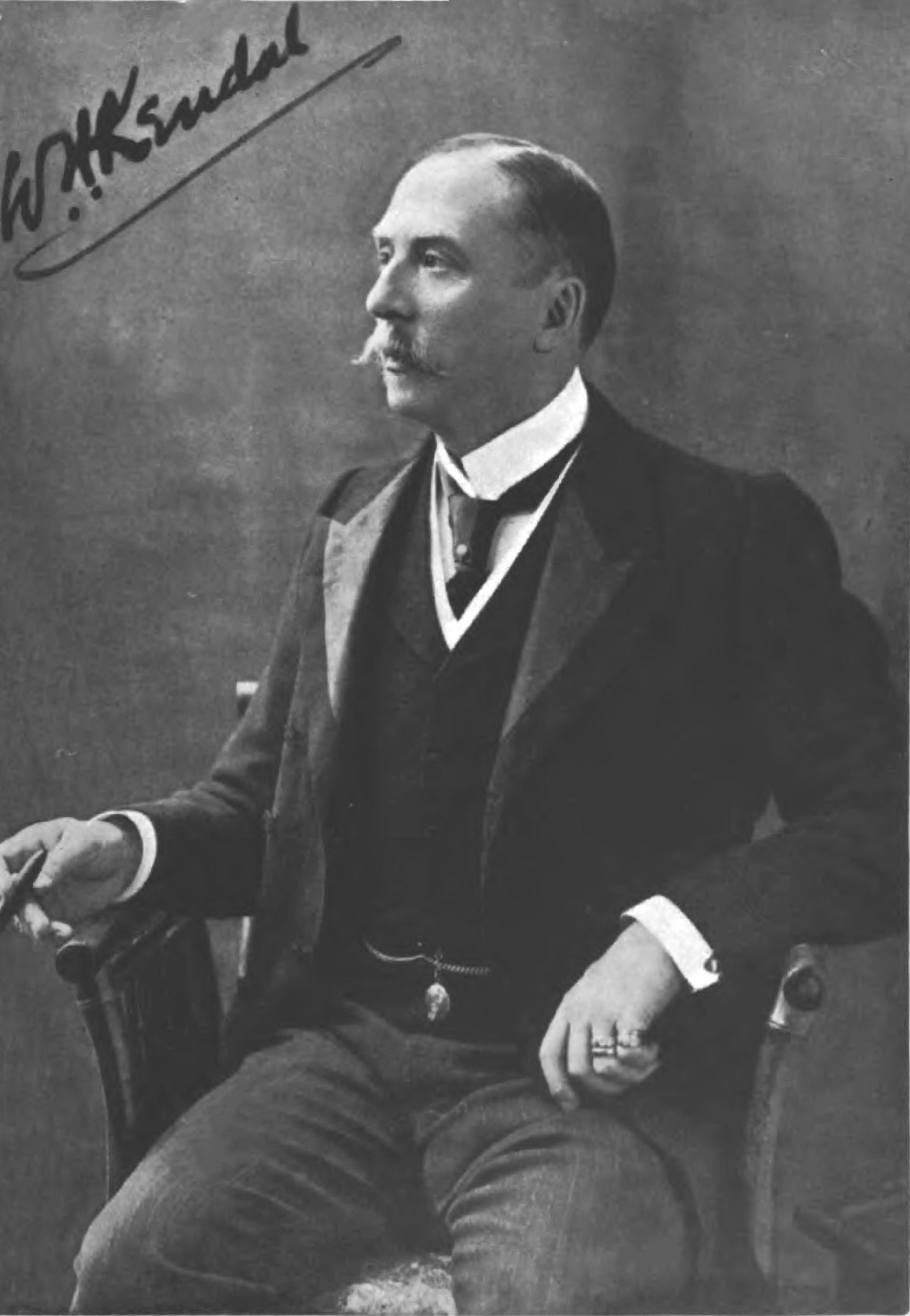
William H. Kendal, c. 1900

William Hunter Kendal (16 December 1843 – 7 November 1917) was an English actor and theatre manager. He and his wife Madge starred at the Haymarket in Shakespearian revivals and the old English comedies beginning in the 1860s. In the 1870s, they starred in a series of "fairy comedies" by W. S. Gilbert and in many plays on the West End with the Bancrofts and others. In the 1880s, they starred at and jointly managed (with John Hare) the St. James's Theatre. They then enjoyed a long touring career.

== Biography ==
Kendal was born William Hunter Grimston in London, the middle son of portrait artist Edward Hunter Grimston, and his wife, Louisa née Rider. His maternal grandfather was a painter, and the boy demonstrated early talent in painting, but his parents urged him to study medicine. He often visited the Soho Theatre to sketch the performers, which led to his trying acting, in 1861, as Louis XIV, in A Life's Revenge, billed as "Mr Kendall".

=== Career ===
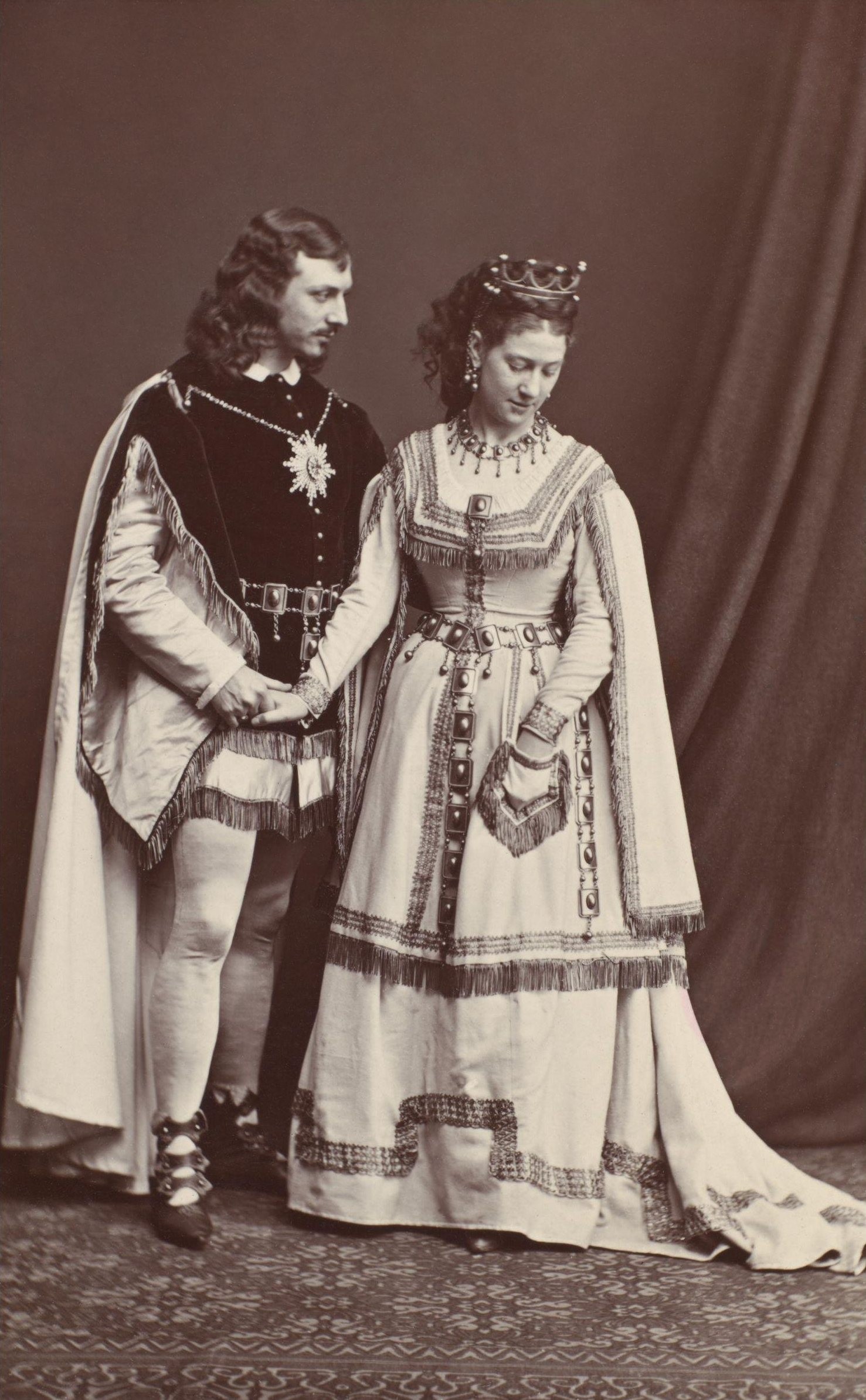
The Kendals as Philamir and Zeolide in W. S. Gilbert's The Palace of Truth (1870)

Kendal continued at the Soho for two years and then played provincial theatres, including in Glasgow, where he performed for four years, with Charles Kean and others, until 1866. He joined J. B. Buckstone's company at the Haymarket Theatre in London in 1866, where he performed in a wide variety of works, from burlesque to Shakespeare and was particularly admired for his comic roles. In 1869 he married the actress Madge Robertson, a sister of the dramatist T. W. Robertson. As "Mr. and Mrs. Kendal", their professional careers became inseparable, and he invariably acted opposite his wife.

His roles included Colonel Blake in J. Palgrave Simpson's A Scrap of Paper, Charles Surface opposite his wife's Lady Teazle, Orlando to her Rosalind in As You Like It (1871), Jack Absolute to her Lydia Languish in The Rivals (1870), and Young Marlowe to her Kate Hardcastle. He was also Captain Beauclerc in Diplomacy, William in William and Susan, W. G. Wills's customized rewriting of Douglas Jerrold's Black-Eyed Susan, and Aubrey Tanqueray to his wife's Paula in Pinero's The Second Mrs Tanqueray. He was Pygmalion to his wife's Galatea in W. S. Gilbert's Pygmalion and Galatea (1871), and the pair starred in the series of "fairy comedies" by Gilbert in the early 1870s, including The Palace of Truth (1870), Broken Hearts, The Wicked World (1873) and Broken Hearts (1875), as well as Gilbert's drama Charity (1874).

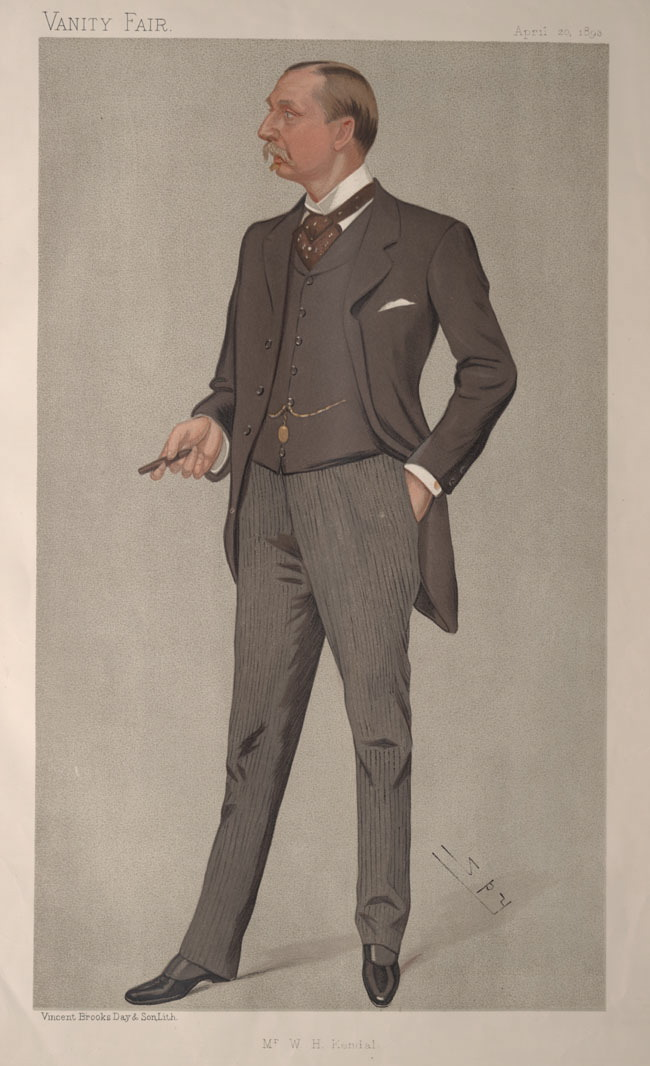
Caricature by Spy published in Vanity Fair in 1893

Kendal and his wife starred at and managed the Royal Court Theatre with John Hare. They then played at the Prince of Wales's Theatre under the management of the Bancrofts in Diplomacy by B. C. Stephenson and Clement Scott (1878, adapted from Sardou's Dora), among other plays. In 1879 they began a long association with John Hare as joint-managers of the St. James's Theatre, where they presented a large number of Arthur Wing Pinero plays, among many others. The Kendals restored the St. James's to popularity and helped to improve the respectability of the Victorian theatre, which had fallen into disrepute among the middle classes. They imposed a high moral code both on stage and behind the scenes. Some of the Kendals' other notable successes in the 1880s included The Squire, Impulse, The Ironmaster and A Scrap of Paper. In 1888, however, the Hare and Kendal partnership ended.

=== Later years ===
From that time, the Kendals chiefly toured. They made their American debut in A Scrap of Paper in 1889, and the success of their first tour in North America was repeated in several successive American seasons, where they spent most of the next five years. They continued to appear in popular plays without interruption until 1908, when they both retired. They had five children, but they became estranged from them.

Kendal was a skilful businessman, manager and art collector, investing his share of the theatre's profits, after making sure to purchase some jewellery for his wife and a painting for himself. He assembled a fine collection of contemporary paintings, which the couple displayed in their homes. He was a long-time member of the Garrick Club, and his wife donated a portrait of him by Hugh Walpole to the club. He joined the Junior Carlton, Beefsteak, Arts, Cosmopolitan, and AA clubs. He enjoyed fishing, shooting, cycling and riding.

Kendal died in 1917, aged 74, in London.
