= Pygmalion and Galatea (play) =

Play by W. S. Gilbert

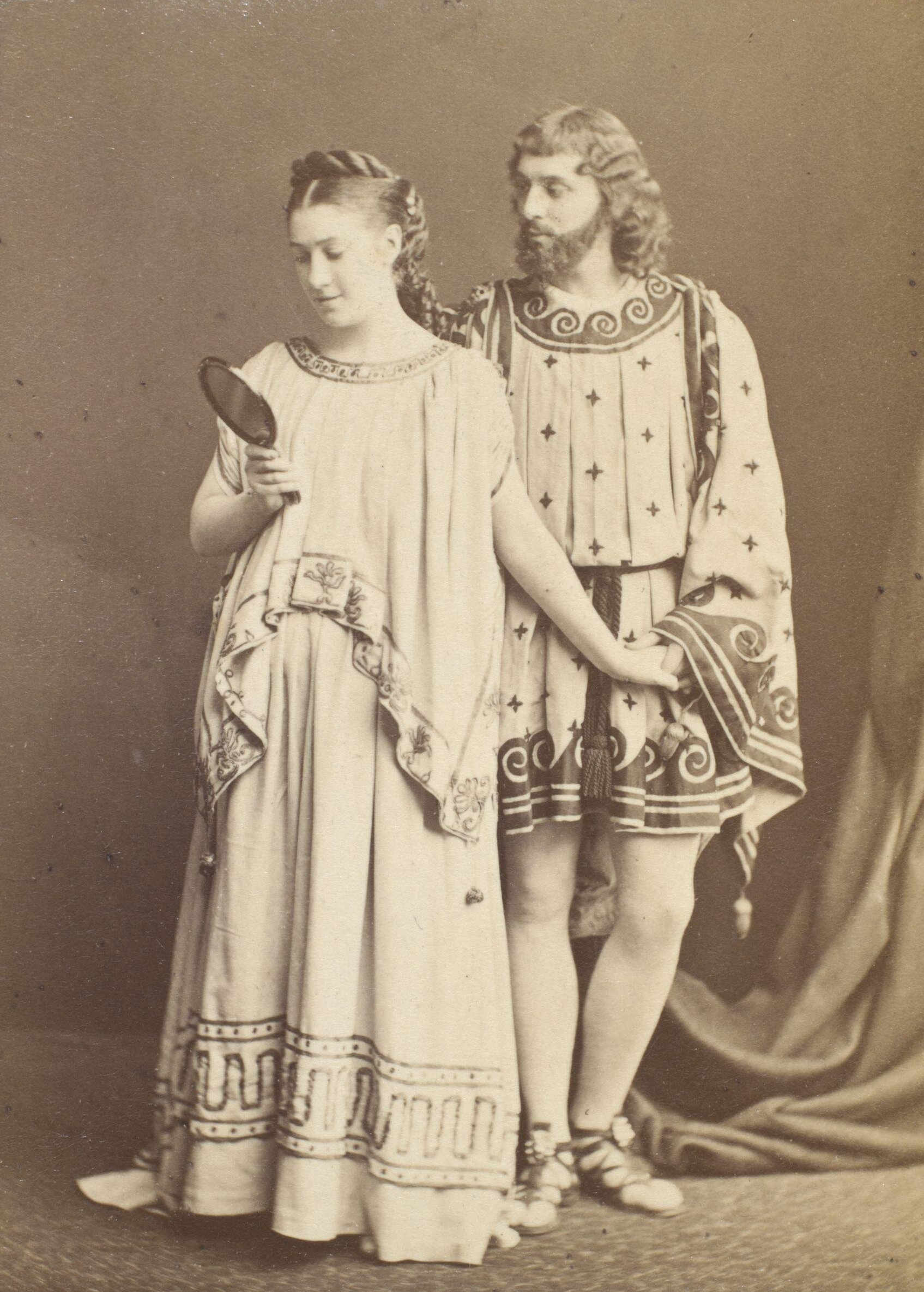
- The Kendals in the title roles, 1871
- Written by: W. S. Gilbert
- Subject: Pygmalion story
- Genre: Mythological comedy

Premiere
- Date premiered: 9 December 1871
- Place premiered: Haymarket Theatre

Pygmalion and Galatea, an Original Mythological Comedy is a blank verse play by W. S. Gilbert in three acts based on the Pygmalion story. It opened at the Haymarket Theatre in London on 9 December 1871 and ran for a very successful 184 performances. It was revived many times, including an 1883 production in New York starring Mary Anderson as Galatea.

Pygmalion was Gilbert's greatest success to that date and is said to have earned him £40,000 during his lifetime. Pygmalion and Galatea was so popular that other dramatic Pygmalion adaptations were rushed to the stage. In January 1872, Ganymede and Galatea opened at the Gaiety Theatre. This was a comic version of Franz von Suppé's Die schöne Galathee, coincidentally with Arthur Sullivan's brother, Fred Sullivan, in the cast. In March 1872, William Brough's Pygmalion; or, The Statue Fair was revived, and in May of that year, a visiting French company produced Victor Massé's Galathée.

== Background ==
Gilbert created several blank verse "fairy comedies" at the Haymarket Theatre for John Baldwin Buckstone and starring William Hunter Kendal and his wife Madge Robertson Kendal (sister of the playwright Tom Robertson), in the early 1870s. These plays, influenced by the fairy work of James Planché, are founded upon the idea of self-revelation by characters under the influence of some magic or some supernatural interference. The first was The Palace of Truth in 1870, a fantasy adapted from a story by Madame de Genlis. Pygmalion and Galatea, a satire of sentimental, romantic attitudes toward myth, was one of seven plays that Gilbert produced in 1871. Together, these plays, and successors such as The Wicked World (1873), Sweethearts (1874), Charity (1874), and Broken Hearts (1875), did for Gilbert on the dramatic stage what the German Reed Entertainments had done for him on the musical stage. They established that his capabilities extended far beyond burlesque and won him artistic credentials as a writer of wide range, who was as comfortable with human drama as with farcical humour.

== Synopsis ==
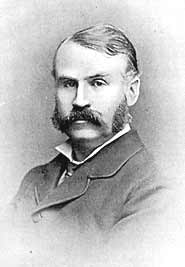
W. S. Gilbert in about 1870

In Gilbert's Pygmalion story, the sculptor is a married man. He sculpts many copies in the image of wife, Cynisca. His wife at first encourages his interest in one of these statues, Galatea. Cynisca is often away, and she doesn't want her husband to be bored. When the statue comes to life, however, matters become complex, as she falls in love with her creator. Galatea is born so innocent that she appears wayward and disrupts the lives she touches during her one day in the flesh. Under the fire of Cynisca's jealousy, and seeing the difficulty in which she has placed Pygmalion, Galatea decides that her original state was happier, and turns back into a statue.

== Roles and original cast ==
- Pygmalion, an Athenian Sculptor – W. H. Kendal
- Leucippus, a Soldier – Mr. Howe
- Chrysos, an Art Patron – J. B. Buckstone
- Agesimos, Chrysos's Slave – Mr. Braid
- Mimos, Pygmalion's Slave – Mr. Weathersby
- Galatea, an Animated Statue – M. Robertson
- Cynisca, Pygmalion's Wife – Caroline Hill
- Daphne, Chrysos's Wife – Mrs. Chippendale
- Myrine, Pygmalion's Sister – Miss Merton

== Critical reception ==
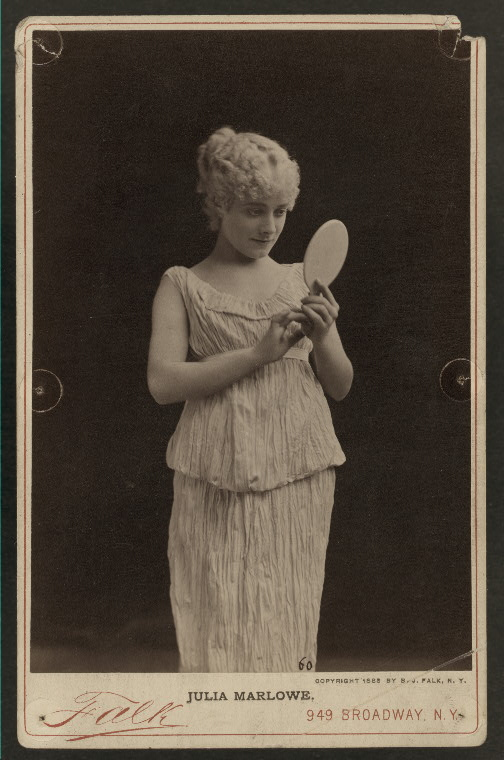
Julia Marlowe as Galatea in a US production

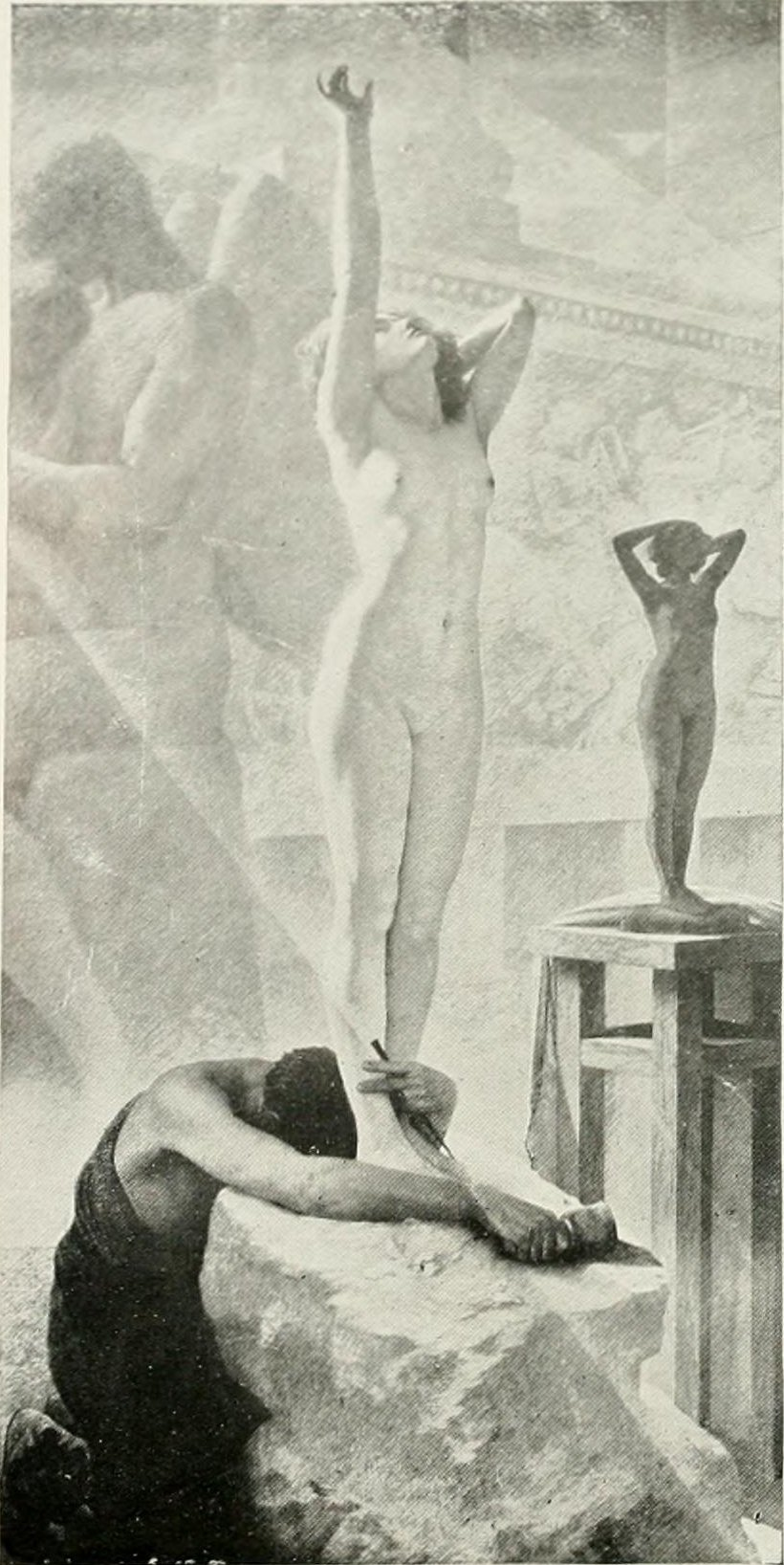
The awakening of Galatea, by Herbert Gustave Schmalz.

"The Cambridge History of English and American Literature" noted:

The satire is shrewd, but not profound; the young author is apt to sneer, and he has by no means learned to make the best use of his curiously logical fancy. That he occasionally degrades high and beautiful themes is not surprising. To do so had been the regular proceeding in burlesque, and the age almost expected it; but Gilbert's is not the then usual hearty cockney vulgarity. In Pygmalion and Galatea, and, still more, in Gretchen (1879)... the vulgarity is cynical and bitter.

A New York Times review of a production of the play at the Fifth Avenue Theatre in New York City said,

Mr. Gilbert, who is inevitably a humorist, has, one must own, put a great deal of truth and humanity into his Pygmalion and Galatea. The play is, from one side, harshly and aggressively disagreeable. Its characters are low, vulgar, and selfish. Pygmalion – an antique poetic conception – is reduced here to snobbishness and priggishness. His sister, his wife, his kinsmen, and his friends are insufferable. But, though insufferable, they are not especially untruthful. Those who try to portray life are brought to the sad work of picturing absurd, weak and sordid personalities. Men, as we know them, are not ideals. They are rather caricatures of ideals. Mr. Gilbert, who has bright satiric force, does not hesitate to put his sting into them – and his purpose is admirably praiseworthy. In several of his plays he is laboured and fantastic; in Pygmalion and Galatea, it seems to us, he presents the pathos of idealism in a very effective manner, contrasting it grimly and cynically with frank reality. Galatea is the spirit of sweet, ingenuous, aspiring womanhood; she is ushered into a world of bitterness, jealousy, vulgarity; she loves her maker, who is a narrow-hearted and fatuous sculptor; she meets those who prove to her that life is a thing of sorrow. At the end, forlorn and broken in soul, she returns to her pedestal, utters her melancholy farewell to the world, and becomes again a statue. The satire in a play like this is, of course, rather darkly drawn. The contrast between the innocent Galatea and the selfish Pygmalion is painful, mournful. But is the contrast, is the satire, under-true? There is nothing so beautiful, so bewildering, as the potency of life. It is astonishing, a posteriori, that life is as small, as unsatisfactory, as it is. Pygmalion and Galatea has, in consequence, a depth which it may not appear to have at first sight. It is a trifle on the surface – a jest aimed at our dull human affairs. But the plot has a barbed point.

== Revivals ==
Revivals included an 1883 production in New York starring Mary Anderson as Galatea, an 1883–84 revival at the Lyceum Theatre, again with Anderson, and an 1888 production at the Lyceum Theatre, with Julia Neilson as Cynisca.

In 1918, the Forest Theater in Carmel-by-the-Sea, California, hosted a production of Pygmalion and Galatea, where Herbert Heron played Pygmalion, Katharine Cooke was Galatea and John Northern Hilliard portrayed Chrysos; Hilliard directed.

== Legacy ==
In 2012, biologist Fred Sander used the play "as a 'hook' to explore the ethics and science of cloning" in his book Created in Our Own Images.com. Sander wrote: "Gilbert's drama not only anticipates psychoanalysis in the 20th century, but also, written a hundred years before the discovery of stem cells, it metaphorically resonates with the 21st century of genomic medicine. ... Gilbert's comedy ... points to new biological, psychological, social, and ethical issues raised by the ... sequencing of the genome and the explosion of stem cell research."
