= Charity (play) =

Play by W. S. Gilbert

Fanny Davenport as Ruth in a New York revival

Charity is a drama in four acts by W. S. Gilbert that explores the issue of a woman who had lived with a man as his wife without ever having married. The play analyses and critiques the double standard in the Victorian era concerning the treatment of men and women who had sex outside of marriage, anticipating the "problem plays" of Shaw and Ibsen. It opened on 3 January 1874 at the Haymarket Theatre in London, where Gilbert had previously presented his 'fairy comedies' The Palace of Truth, Pygmalion and Galatea, and The Wicked World. Charity ran for about 61 performances, closing on 14 March 1874, and received tours and revivals thereafter.

Gilbert created several plays for the Haymarket Theatre, managed by John Baldwin Buckstone and starring William Hunter Kendal and his wife, Madge Robertson Kendal, sister of the playwright Thomas William Robertson, in the early 1870s. In Charity, Gilbert wanted to use what he perceived as Mrs. Kendal's capabilities as a tragedienne, and, after abandoning his original plan of a vindictive villainess, he composed one of his most powerful women's roles for her in this play.

1874 was a particularly busy year for Gilbert. He illustrated The Piccadilly Annual; supervised a revival of Pygmalion and Galatea; and wrote Charity; Rosencrantz and Guildenstern, a parody of Hamlet; a dramatisation of Ought We to Visit Her? (a novel by Annie Edwardes), an adaptation from the French, Committed for Trial, another adaptation from the French called The Blue-Legged Lady, a play, Sweethearts, and Topsyturveydom, a comic opera. He also wrote a Bab-illustrated story called "The Story of a Twelfth Cake" for the Graphic Christmas number.

== Roles ==
- Dr. Athelney, a Colonial Bishop-elect – William Henry Chippendale
- Ted Athelney, his son (aged 38) – H. R.Teesdale
- Mr. Jonas Smailey, a country gentleman (aged 60) – H. Howe
- Fred Smailey, his son (aged 22) – William Hunter Kendal
- Mr. Fitz-Partington, a Private Inquiry Officer – John Baldwin Buckstone
- Mrs. Van Brugh, a widow (aged 35) – Madge Robertson
- Eve, her daughter (aged 17) – Amy Roselle
- Ruth Tredgett, a tramp (aged 37) – Miss Woolgar (Sarah Woolgar?)
- A butler, a groom, a footman, and other servants.

== Synopsis ==
=== Act I: A pretty boudoir in Mrs. Van Brugh's country-house ===
Fred Smailey and Eve Van Brugh are making plans for a school feast. Fred is a very grave person, objecting to the frivolous entertainments being planned by Eve, but they are in love, and, despite her teasing and ignoring his chides, they get along quite well. Fred doesn't think Eve's mother cares much for him, although she agreed to their engagement.

Edward "Ted" Athelney, Eve's "amateur brother" arrives, and Fred claims that Eve isn't at home, to her confusion. Fred sees Ted as a potential rival – an amateur brother can so easily slip into something more – and manages to convince Eve to be less affectionate towards Ted. On learning of her impending marriage, Ted realises that he is in love with Eve, but he tries to hide it. After Fred and Eve leave, he admits it to Eve's mother, but he cares too much about Eve to let her know, now that she's engaged to be married.

Dr. Athelney appears to thank Mrs. Van Brugh for a favour, and she asks his advice about what to settle on Eve, as Fred's father intends to do nothing, claiming that all his money is tied up. In the course of conversation, Mrs. Van Brugh's husband's first wife is mentioned, but the discussion is interrupted by servants dragging in Ruth Tredgett, a tramp who was caught trying to steal from them. She arrogantly admits to the theft, and Dr. Athelney condemns her. Mrs. Van Brugh, however, plans to reform her, having learned Ruth's history: born into poverty, raised among thieves, falling victim to a "psalm-singing villain" who had his way with her then abandoned her. Athelney's moralistic arguments fail in the face of this history, and he admits that her life was "what God knows it couldn't well have helped being under the circumstances." Mrs. Van Brugh promises to do everything in her power to help Ruth out of criminality, and Ruth, stunned, agrees to it.

=== Act II: Same ===
MR. SMAILEY: ...Moreover, I have been informed that you have, for some years past, been in the habit of searching out women of bad character who profess penitence, with the view of enabling them to earn their living in the society of blameless Christians.
MRS. VAN BRUGH: I have.
MR. SMAILEY: I tell you at once that I am loth to believe this thing.
MRS. VAN BRUGH: (with indignant surprise) Why are you loth to believe this thing?
MR. SMAILEY: Because its audacity, its want of principle, and, above all, its unspeakable indelicacy, shock me beyond power of expression.
MRS. VAN BRUGH: Mr. Smailey, is it possible that you are speaking deliberately? Think of any blameless woman whom you love and honour, and who is loved and honoured of all. Think of the shivering outcast whose presence is contamination, whose touch is horror unspeakable, whose very existence is an unholy stain on God's earth. Woman—loved, honoured, courted by all. Woman—shunned, loathed, and unutterably despised, but still—Woman. I do not plead for those whose advantages of example and education render their fall ten thousand times more culpable.... (With a broken voice) — It may be that something is to be said, even for them. I plead for those who have had the world against them from the first – who with blunted weapons and untutored hands have fought society single-handed, and fallen in the unequal fight. God help them!
MR. SMAILEY: Mrs. Van Brugh, I have no desire to press hardly on any fellow-creature; but society, the grand arbiter in these matters, has decided that a woman who has once forfeited her moral position shall never regain it.
MRS. VAN BRUGH: Even though her repentance be sincere and beyond doubt?
MR. SMAILEY: Even so.
MRS. VAN BRUGH: Even though she fell unprotected, unadvised, perishing with want and chilled with despair?
MR. SMAILEY: Even so. For such a woman there is no excuse – for such a woman there is no pardon.
MRS. VAN BRUGH: You mean no pardon on earth?
MR. SMAILEY: Of course I mean no pardon on earth. What can I have to do with pardon elsewhere?
MRS. VAN BRUGH: Nothing. Mr. Smailey, when you have procured the will, I shall be ready to see you; but before you go let me tell you that I am inexpressibly shocked and pained at the terrible theory you have advanced. (He endeavours to speak.) Oh, understand me, I do not charge you with exceptional heartlessness. You represent the opinions of society, and society is fortunate in its mouthpiece. Heaven teaches that there is a pardon for every penitent. Earth teaches that there is one sin for which there is no pardon – when the sinner is a woman!
— Act II

Smailey arrives at Van Brugh's house with Fitz-Partington, a private detective disguised as Smailey's solicitor, to discuss Fred and Eve's marriage settlement. Mrs. Van Brugh proposes to settle on them a farm in Buckinghamshire left to her by her godfather, but she isn't aware if it is a leasehold or a freehold. Smailey offers to fetch the will, which Mrs. Van Brugh hasn't actually seen, to clarify the point. Smailey also brings up the subject of Ruth, who has been established as a needlewoman nearby. He considers this a violation of all that is decent, which shocks Mrs. Van Brugh, who forcefully argues in Ruth's defence. Ruth arrives, and Mrs. Van Brugh leaves. Smailey begins to lecture Ruth on morality and the impertinence of her "imposture". Ruth interrupts him, having recognised him as the "psalm-singing villain" who had caused her fall. Smailey tries to backtrack and begins to expose all the tangled ways that he has justified his own behaviour while condemning others. Ruth, a bit exasperated, still forgives him, as she hopes to be forgiven. Smailey is shocked that someone like her would dare to adopt such a tone with him, and begins to attack Mrs. Van Brugh again. Ruth furiously stops him, saying that Mrs. Van Brugh is "a bit chipped off heaven. ... She's—She's—I'm slow at findin' words that mean goodness. My words run mostly the other way, wus luck."

Smailey says he has no desire to be hard on her, but that "it is a fraud". Ruth points out he was guilty of fraud, and she has evidence to prove it. Smailey tries to buy it from her, but she's respectable now: She won't take his money, though she keeps the papers as she "ain't a fool"; Smailey leaves. Fitz-Partington interviews Ruth, to her confusion. Mrs. Van Brugh re-enters, and Fitz-Partington warns her about Smailey, explaining that his detective agency was called on to find out about Smailey's fraud, but as Smailey then hired him to investigate Mrs. Van Brugh, they had combined the cases. However, Fitz-Partington goes on to ask several further questions about Mrs. Van Brugh's marriage, and she begins to realise what Smailey is looking for: if Mrs. Van Brugh's godfather had called her Captain Van Brugh's wife in his will, her secret might be revealed. Smailey returns with the will, and reads out the relevant section about the farm, ending with the section referring to her as "Catherine Ellen, wife of Captain Richard Van Brugh." She faints into a chair.

=== Act III: Morning room in Smailey's house. Door at back, opening onto a pretty garden ===
Fred mutters to himself about why he must break up with Eve, giving a short summary of the plot so far. He suspects his father will be furious at his dishonourable action and plans to appeal to his family pride. However, Smailey soon arrives, and, after both spend some time trying to lead the other towards the point, Smailey is the first to say that Fred must break off with Eve. Fred affects indignation, but allows himself to be convinced, on "moral" grounds.

Ruth arrives with a message from Mrs. Van Brugh asking to meet with Smailey. Ruth asks Smailey what's wrong with Mrs. Van Brugh, and Smailey announces that ruin will soon befall her, and he begins to tell Ruth "what she has been". Ruth interrupts and points out that what Mrs. Van Brugh is now is more important than what she was, and that his past was hardly blameless. Ruth tells him to take what's his, but no more. As Smailey stands to benefit if he can get Mrs. Van Brugh removed as beneficiary of her godfather's will, he plans to commence proceedings to get what's his. Ruth is furious and announces that if he does so, she'll reveal the evidence of his past fraud. Smailey tries to weasel out of it, saying that "Mrs. Van Brugh would admit the justice of his claim", and he gets Ruth to agree that if Mrs. Van Brugh makes a statement of her own free will, Ruth will let it pass. As Ruth leaves, Smailey rants about the injustice of his past sin being held over his head, whilst planning to condemn Mrs. Van Brugh for her past.

Eve and Fred arrive with Mrs. Van Brugh, and the young couple go out to the garden together. Mrs. Van Brugh confesses to Smailey that she believes that a flaw in the will may have left her penniless. Smailey reveals that he knows this and accuses her of being part of wilful bigamy with her "husband", as his first wife died after Mrs. Van Brugh married him. She tearfully confesses that she had never married him, but merely lived with him as his wife. Smailey is shocked at this and leaps to the attack, insisting, despite her pleas for mercy, that he "will spare her nothing" and that she must confess all, even to her own daughter. She pleads with him, offering to sign any deed he asks, to spare her the shame, but he holds a public announcement of her acts over her head if she does not submit to his will. She pleads further, holding up all her good deeds as evidence of her atonement. Smailey retorts that all her good works spring from her desire for forgiveness and taunts her with her previous criticisms of his own hard-heartedness. She cries "enough", and, rallying, takes the shame onto herself in her own terms: "So let it be. You are strong – for you have the world on your side. I am weak – for I am alone. If I am to die this moral death, it shall be by my own hand." She calls everyone to her, asks Eve to kiss her once more before the truth is revealed, then confesses all. Eve faints into Ted's arms. Ruth recoils, and Smailey and Fred watch, emotionless.

=== Act IV: Library at Dr. Athelney's ===
Mrs. Van Brugh is reading letters in Dr. Athelney's home, where she has been living ever since Smailey has made her penniless. After finally dropping the last letter – a request for her to sit to be photographed by "Scumley and Ripp" – in disgust, she gives vent to her frustration: Her name is now "a word of reproach in every household in the country," her "story a thing to be whispered and hinted at, but not to be openly discussed, for reason of its very shame." Her years of atonement are "held to be mere evidence of skilfully sustained hypocrisy." Even Ruth has left her. Eve tries to comfort her. Mrs. Van Brugh still feels guilty: As Eve has now been shown to be illegitimate, Eve too will have to suffer, including losing her husband-to-be, Fred. Eve refuses to assign guilt to her mother, insisting she can "see nothing else" but "the perfect woman of the past eighteen years". They embrace.

MRS. VAN BRUGH: This is monstrous beyond expression. I have borne my terrible punishment to this point patiently, and without undue murmur, but I will bear no more. Let that man know this. He has roused me at last, and I will meet him face to face. Let him know that, helpless and friendless as he believes me to be; crushed as I am under the weight of the fearful revelation he has extorted from me; shunned as I am, and despised even by those who all despise but I, I am yet strong in this, that I have nothing more to lose. He has made me desperate, and let him beware. There are men in these days as hot in the defence of an insulted woman as in the days gone by, and he shall have a legion of them about his ears. I have been punished enough. I will be punished no further.
-Act IV

Fitz-Partington arrives with news of a new plan by Smailey: he plans to prosecute Mrs. Van Brugh for bigamy, having refused to believe her, and, to that end, has advertised for Captain Van Brugh's first wife's burial certificate. Mrs. Van Brugh is roused to anger by this, and declares that she will "be punished no further". Fitz-Partington leaves. Dr. Athelney announces the imminent arrival of his son and Fred, and Eve runs to Fred, crying that she knew he would come. He declares himself unable to control his father. He says he had lain awake all night, trying to think of how to lighten the burden on Eve and, finally, came to realise what he must do: Release her from her engagement to a member of the family that has been so hard on her. Eve faints. Dr. Athelney begins berating him and declares that "I have been a clergyman of the Church of England for five and forty years, and, until today, I have never regretted the restrictions that my calling has imposed upon me. My hands, sir, are tied. Ted, my boy, these remarks do not apply to you." Ted seizes Fred and berates him. Mrs. Van Brugh asks Dr. Athenley to stop Ted, but Dr. Athelney is "too fond of plain truth, and hears it far too seldom to stop it when he does hear it."

Smailey then arrives and asks for everyone's attention. He felt it his duty as a magistrate to disbelieve Mrs. Van Brugh's statement that she hadn't married Captain Van Brugh, and so prove her guilty of a greater crime, and his advertisement for proof that Captain Van Brugh's first wife was not dead at the time of the current Mrs. Van Brugh's marriage has been answered. Ruth arrives, to the confusion of all, bearing the proof – but the proof turns out to be of Smailey's former fraud. He is arrested, though Fred promises to stay with him to the end, and the Athelneys, Ruth, Eve, and Mrs. Van Brugh plan to sail off to Australia together, where Dr. Athelney has been granted a bishopric, and they can live "humbly as become penitents, cheerfully as becomes those who have hope, earnestly as becomes those who speak out of the fullness of their experience" and teach "lessons of loving-kindness, patience, faith, forbearance, and charity."

== Themes in the script ==
=== Echoes and foreshadowing ===
Several phrases are echoed throughout the play. In Act I, for example, Fred describes Mrs. Van Brugh as "beloved, honoured, and courted by all" – a phrase that Mrs. Van Brugh will repeat in her Act II scene with Smailey (as seen in the quote to the right): "Woman—loved, honoured, courted by all. Woman—shunned, loathed, and unutterably despised, but still—Woman", foreshadowing the change in status that she will undergo by the end of the play. Ruth, in her Act I description of people who claimed to be trying to help her, describes people who have claimed to be trying to help her before: "There's ladies come odd times. I call to mind one—come in a carriage she did. Same story—poor, miserable, lost one—wretched, abandoned, fellow-creetur, and that." This gets echoed in Mr. Smailey's catchphrase, "I have no desire to press hardly on any fellow creature" (also seen in the quote), which becomes more and more ironic in usage as the play goes on, finally being uttered by Fitz-Partington as he informs Mr. Smailey: "I desire to press hardly on no fellow-creature, but your own policeman is without, and he will be happy to walk off with you whenever you find it convenient to be arrested."

Foreshadowing is also used in Mrs. Van Brugh's first entrance:

MRS. VAN BURGH:

Well, I've done for myself now; go away from me; I'm a pariah, an outcast; don't, for goodness' sake, be seen talking with me.

EVE: Why, mamma, dear, what on earth have you been doing?

MRS. VAN BURGH: Doing? Listen and shudder! I've put a dissenter in one of my almshouses!

=== "Fallen" Women ===
Mrs. Van Brugh's fall is central to the plot of the play, but Ruth Tredgett, the woman she helps back to respectability in Act I, shows the fate of women who cannot even pretend to respectability after their "fall".

RUTH: ...I got sick and tired of it all, and began to think o' putting a end to it, when I met a smooth-spoken chap – a gentleman, if you please – as wanted to save me from the danger afore me. Well, wot odds? He was a psalm-singing villain, and soon left me. (Act I)

We soon learn who the "psalm-singing villain" is, in Act II, when Mr. Smailey confronts Ruth. This happens soon after the scene in the side box:

MR. SMAILEY: Stop, woman. (She [Ruth] turns and advances.) Don't—don't approach me—we have nothing in common. Listen at a distance. Mrs. Van Brugh has thought proper to place you on a pedestal that levels you, socially, with respectable Christians. In so doing, I consider that she has insulted respectable Christians. She thinks proper to suffer you to enter my presence. In so doing, I consider she has insulted me. I desire you to understand that when a woman of your stamp enters the presence of a Christian gentleman, she——

RUTH: (who has been looking at him in wonder during this speech) Smailey! That's never you! (Mr. Smailey falls back in his chair.)
RUTH: Aye, Smailey, it's Ruth Tredgett.
MR. SMAILEY: (very confused) I did not know whom I was speaking to.

RUTH: But you knowed what you was speakin' to, Jonas Smailey. Go on. I'm kinder curous to hear what you've got to say about a woman o' my stamp. I kinder curous to hear wot Jonas Smailey's got to say about his own work.

His son, Fred, turns out to be a similar character. In the following scene from Act III, Fred has already agreed to break things off with Eve. She and her mother have arrived, and his father is about to confront Mrs. Van Brugh with evidence of her impropriety with Captain Van Brugh, which he presumes to be bigamy, although it turns out they never married in the first place. In the meantime, Fred takes Eve to the garden:

FRED: If the arbour were a consecrated arbour, and I had a licence in my pocket, we might take a turn – in the garden – that would surprise our dear friends.
EVE: What, without a wedding-dress and bridesmaids, and bouquets and presents, and a breakfast? My dear Fred, it wouldn't be legal!

=== Environment as determining morality ===
The play raises the question whether a person raised badly, but who sincerely wants to redeem him or herself, should be held to the same standards as those who had every advantage. This was a favourite theme of Gilbert's, which is illustrated in the scene quoted in the sidebox above and also in this scene from Act I:

RUTH: No, I never had no father—my mother was such as me. See here, lady. Wot's to become of a gal whose mother was such as me? Mother! Why, I could swear afore I could walk!

DR. ATHELNEY: But were you brought up to any calling?
RUTH: Yes, sir, I were; I were brought up to be a thief. Every soul as I knowed was a thief, and the best thief was the best thought on. Maybe a kid not long born ought to have knowed better. I dunno, I must ha' been born bad, for it seemed right enough to me. Well, it was in prison and out o' prison—three months here and six months there—till I was sixteen. I sometimes thinks as if they'd bin half as ready to show me how to go right as they was to punish me for goin' wrong, I might have took the right turnin' and stuck to it afore this. At sixteen I got seven-year for shop-liftin', and was sent out to Port Phillip. I soon got a ticket and tried service and needlework, but no one wouldn't have me; and I got sick and tired of it all, and began to think o' putting an end to it, when I met a smooth-spoken chap—a gentleman, if you please—as wanted to save me from the danger afore me. Well, wot odds? He was a psalm-singing villain, and he soon left me. No need to tell the rest—to such as you it can't be told. I'm 'most as bad as I can be—as bad as I can be!
MRS. VAN BURGH: I think not; I think not. What do you say, Doctor?

DR. ATHELNEY: (struggling with his tears) Say, ma'am? I say that you, Ruth Tredgett, have been a most discreditable person, and you ought to be heartily ashamed of yourself, Ruth Tredgett; and as a clergymen of the Church of England I feel bound to tell you that—that your life has been—has been what God knows it couldn't well have helped being under the circumstances.

== Reception and analysis ==
The plot, involving a woman who had lived with a man as his wife without ever having married, and who had dedicated her life to charity afterwards, was a volatile social subject. Shame was an important element in Victorian drama, and Gilbert's play was criticised for its liberal ending, where unchastity is not treated with characteristic shame. Charity questioned the convention that rules of premarital chastity, framed for women in the Victorian era, did not apply to men. It also argued that education and a middle-class upbringing set standards that the less fortunate ought not be judged by—that is, the importance of environment in determining morality. Audiences weren't ready to have core societal values, like the sexual double standard, questioned so directly, and Charity was denounced as immoral. The Era, in its review, echoed the consensus of both critics and audiences that the play would have had greater success had Gilbert's ending not "evinced a... scornful disregard of certain conventional laws in writing for the stage," meaning that while "sinners" could be pitied, they were expected to come to a bad end (ostracism or death) in Victorian theatre. In addition, Buckstone insisted upon the addition of comedy, so elements of farce were added and the role of Fitz-Partington was built up for him. Professor Jane Stedman believes this may have contributed to the play's failure.

Charity lost money and closed on 14 March. Its failure was disappointing to Gilbert, particularly after the success of his earlier "fairy comedies" at the Haymarket, and he grumbled that "pieces written with anything like an earnest purpose seldom seem to succeed." Charity did have a good provincial tour, and a production at the Fifth Avenue Theatre in New York, starring Fanny Davenport and Ada Dyas as Ruth. Augustin Daly's production at the Fifth Avenue Theatre in 1880 was not authorised by the author, and Gilbert was angry that Daly "debased" his play, adding characters and revising the text. The American courts would not issue an injunction to prohibit this, since British copyright was unenforceable in America at that time (as Gilbert and Sullivan would experience with H.M.S. Pinafore and their later hits).

It would not be until the rise of Henrik Ibsen and George Bernard Shaw in the 1880s and 1890s that the British public would accept such blunt challenges to their world-views on stage. However, by then Gilbert's play had been forgotten.

== See also ==
- Women in the Victorian era
- Victorian era
- Victorian morality
