= William Terriss =

English actor (1847–1897)

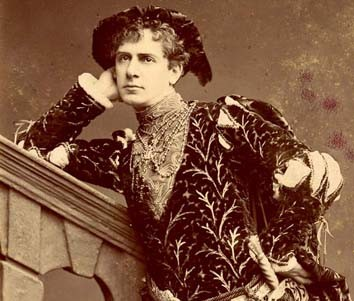
William Terriss, c. 1880

William Terriss (20 February 1847 – 16 December 1897), born as William Charles James Lewin, was an English actor, known for his swashbuckling hero roles, such as Robin Hood, as well as parts in classic dramas and comedies. He was also a notable Shakespearean performer. He was the father of the Edwardian musical comedy star Ellaline Terriss and the film director Tom Terriss.

Athletic as a child, Terriss briefly joined the merchant navy and tried several professions abroad and at home. Adopting the stage name William Terriss, he made his first stage appearance in 1868 and was first in the West End in Tom Robertson's Society in 1871. In the same year he had major successes in Robin Hood and Rebecca and quickly established himself as one of Britain's most popular actors. In 1880, he joined Henry Irving's company at the Lyceum Theatre, appearing mostly in Shakespeare plays.

In 1885, he met 24-year-old Jessie Millward, with whom he starred in The Harbour Lights by G. R. Sims and Henry Pettitt. They toured Britain and America together. Terriss played the hero parts in Adelphi melodramas from the late 1880s, among other roles. In 1897, he was stabbed to death by a deranged actor, Richard Archer Prince, at the stage door of the Adelphi Theatre, where he was appearing. Terriss's ghost is supposed to haunt Covent Garden tube station and the Adelphi Theatre.

== Life and early career ==
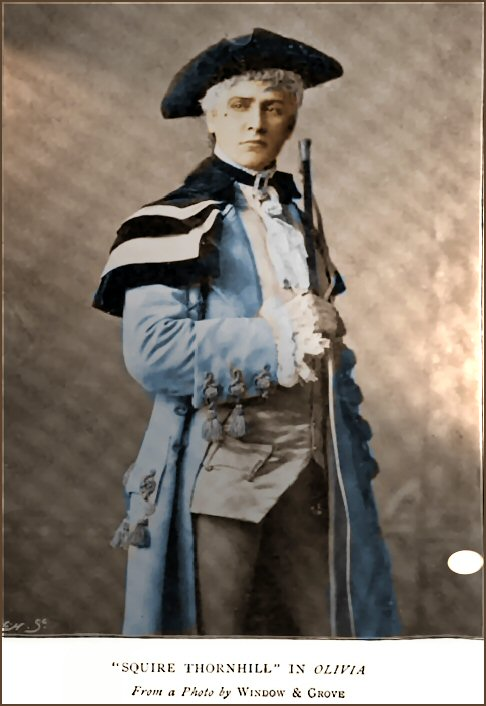
Terriss as Squire Thornhill in Olivia, 1878

Terriss was the third and youngest son of George Herbert Lewin, a barrister, and his wife Mary née Friend. He was born in St John's Wood, London. His brother Thomas Herbert Lewin became a British administrator in India. Terriss was educated at Christ's Hospital and Bruce Castle School, Tottenham, where he was a friend of J. Comyns Carr and Frederick Selous. Carr later wrote of Terriss's school days that "if he gained but little learning, he at any rate acquired a perfect mastery in the art of tree-climbing". Terriss then studied at Windermere College and Jesus College, Oxford, without taking a degree. He loved the adventurous, outdoor life. He married Isabel Lewis (stage name Amy Fellowes) in 1870 and had a daughter, Ellaline, who became a well known actress in Edwardian musical comedy, often appearing with her husband, the actor-manager Seymour Hicks. He also had two sons, William and Tom, who became an actor and later a well known film director. His aunt and uncle were the writer Harriet Lewin and the historian George Grote.

After stints in the merchant navy, and as a tea-planter in Bengal and other unsuccessful ventures, he returned to England, working briefly in a hospital where his brother was a surgeon, and then as an apprentice engineer. Having enjoyed amateur theatricals, he decided to try the stage, adopting the stage-name William Terriss. His first appearance on stage was at the Prince of Wales Theatre in Birmingham in 1868 as Chouser in The Flying Scud. His first West End theatre role was the small part of Lord Cloudrays in a revival of Tom Robertson's Society in 1870, at the old Prince of Wales's Theatre. Still restless, however, Terriss then travelled with his wife to South America and the Falkland Islands, where he tried his hand at sheep-farming and other rustic jobs. In 1871 Terriss returned to London with his wife and baby. He had successes at the Theatre Royal, Drury Lane, in Robin Hood and in Rebecca, based on Ivanhoe by Sir Walter Scott, among other plays. His wanderlust again compelled him to take his young family to America, this time Kentucky, to breed horses. Again failing to find financial success, Terriss returned to London in 1873.

Over the next few years he established his acting career. His good looks, presence, fine voice, friendly demeanour and gallant bearing made him one of Britain's most popular actors. Moira Shearer described him as "Byronically handsome, charmingly impudent, of great courage and rather less brain". Because of his swashbuckling style, he became famous in hero parts and was known as "Breezy Bill". In 1873, at the Strand Theatre, he appeared as Doricourt in the comedy The Belle's Stratagem, which was a long-running success. He then returned to Drury Lane, playing in such roles as Romeo in Romeo and Juliet, and was popular as Captain Molyneux in Dion Boucicault's The Shaughraun, among others. He continued to play in various London theatres in the mid-1870s such roles as Julian Peveril in a successful adaptation of Peveril of the Peak and the title role in the stage adaptation of Nicholas Nickleby at the Adelphi Theatre. In 1878 he had a hit as Squire Thornhill in Olivia, an adaptation by W. G. Wills of The Vicar of Wakefield, alongside Ellen Terry and Hermann Vezin. Among other roles, especially in melodrama, in the late 1870s, he was Captain Absolute in The Rivals.

== Peak years ==
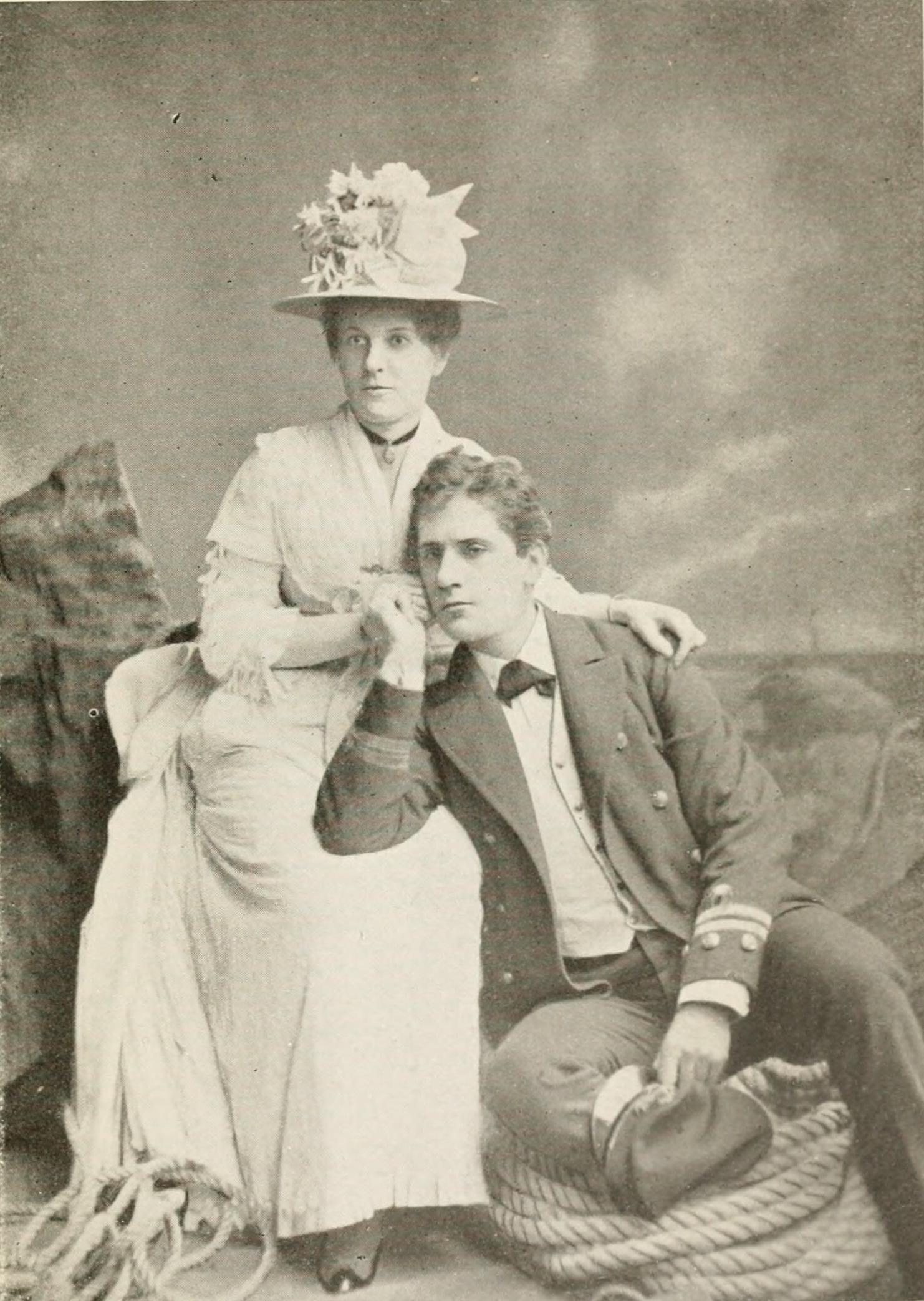
Terriss and Jessie Millward in The Harbour Lights

In 1880 he joined Henry Irving's company at the Lyceum Theatre, playing such parts as Cassio in Irving's hit production of Othello, Laertes in Hamlet, Bassanio in The Merchant of Venice, Flutter in The Belle's Stratagem, Courriol in The Lyons Mail, Jack Wyatt in James Albery's Two Roses and Mercutio in Romeo and Juliet to enthusiastic notices. In 1895 he acted there opposite Mary Anderson, for example, as Romeo to her Juliet, in a long run. He was Don Pedro in the long 1882 run of Much Ado About Nothing and travelled with the Lyceum company on its 1883–1884 American tour. Terriss's roles opposite Anderson also included the male title character in Pygmalion and Galatea. In the revival of Olivia that followed, he again earned critical praise. Terriss became close friends with Irving and also with his neighbour, George Bernard Shaw.

In December 1885 Terriss met 24-year-old Jessie Millward, with whom he starred as David Kingsley in the extraordinarily successful The Harbour Lights (by G. R. Sims and Henry Pettitt), which ran for 513 performances. The pair established themselves as romantic leads together and presumably became lovers. In 1887 Terriss and Millward were engaged at the Adelphi in its melodramas, with Terriss in the hero parts, beginning with Frank Beresford in The Bells of Haslemere (1887). He excited the audience at the Adelphi in both passionate love scenes and in fighting scenes. For the next half dozen years, he rejoined Irving at the Lyceum, where his most acclaimed roles included the title role in Henry VIII (1892) and as Henry II in Becket (1893). In 1889–90, and again in 1893–94, Terriss and Millward toured in the US with Irving.

In 1894 Terriss rejoined the Adelphi, earning even greater fame in melodrama. In 1895, he had a great critical success in Swordsman's Daughter by Clement Scott and B. C. Stephenson. This was followed by One of the Best, inspired by the Dreyfus Trial. His son-in-law, Seymour Hicks, wrote the piece at the suggestion of the dramatist W. S. Gilbert. Subsequent plays were also great successes for Terriss and the theatre. Terriss's last appearance was as Captain Thorne in Secret Service. The New York Dramatic Mirror called Terriss "one of the greatest and next to Henry Irving undoubtedly the most popular actor in England".

== Murder ==
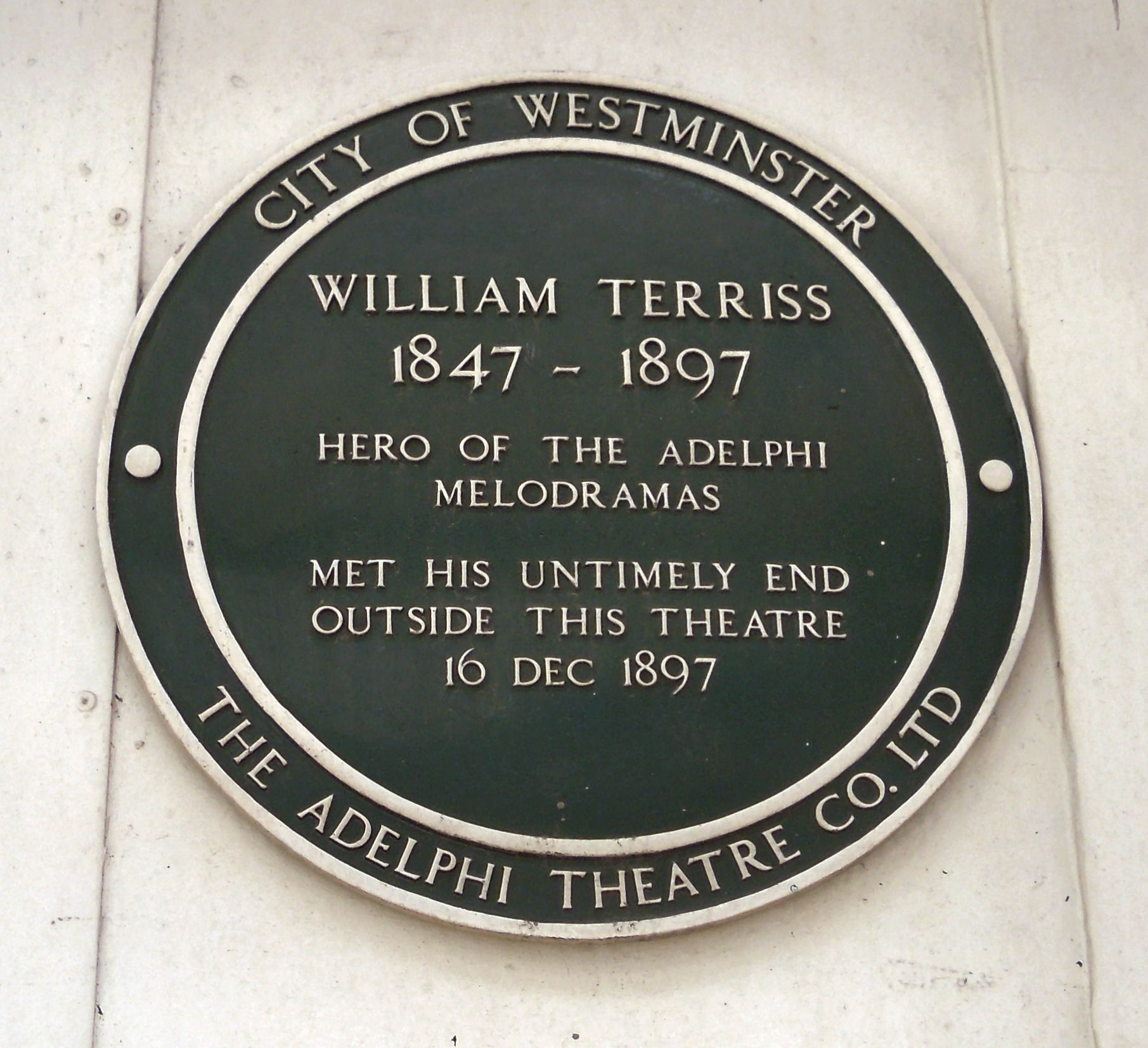
Plaque at the Adelphi Theatre stage door

Terriss's murder as depicted in The Illustrated Police News (1897)

On 16 December 1897, as he was entering the Adelphi Theatre through the stage door in Maiden Lane to prepare for the evening's performance of Secret Service, 50-year-old Terriss was stabbed to death by a deranged and disgruntled actor, Richard Archer Prince. Terriss had helped the struggling younger actor to find work in various productions that he had a hand in. However, Prince had, over the years, increasingly abused alcohol and become mentally unstable. During the run of The Harbour Lights, in which Prince had a minor role, Terriss took offence to something that Prince said about him and had Prince dismissed. Terriss, however, sent small sums of money to Prince via the Actors' Benevolent Fund, and continued to try to find him acting work. By the end of 1897, Prince was destitute and desperate for work, but he had become unemployable.

On 13 December 1897 Prince was forcibly ejected from the foyer of the Vaudeville Theatre, and he and Terriss were seen to argue the next night in Terriss's dressing room in the Adelphi Theatre. On the day of the murder Prince asked for money at the Fund's office, but was told that his request could not be considered that day. He then apparently crossed the street and waited for Terriss, concealed in a doorway near the Adelphi's stage door.

The murder became a sensation in the London press. At the trial Prince was found guilty but insane and sent to Broadmoor Criminal Lunatic Asylum, where he died in 1937. His relatively mild sentence was met with anger by the theatrical community, and Sir Henry Irving was later quoted as saying that "Terriss was an actor, so his murderer will not be executed."

== Memorials and references in popular culture ==
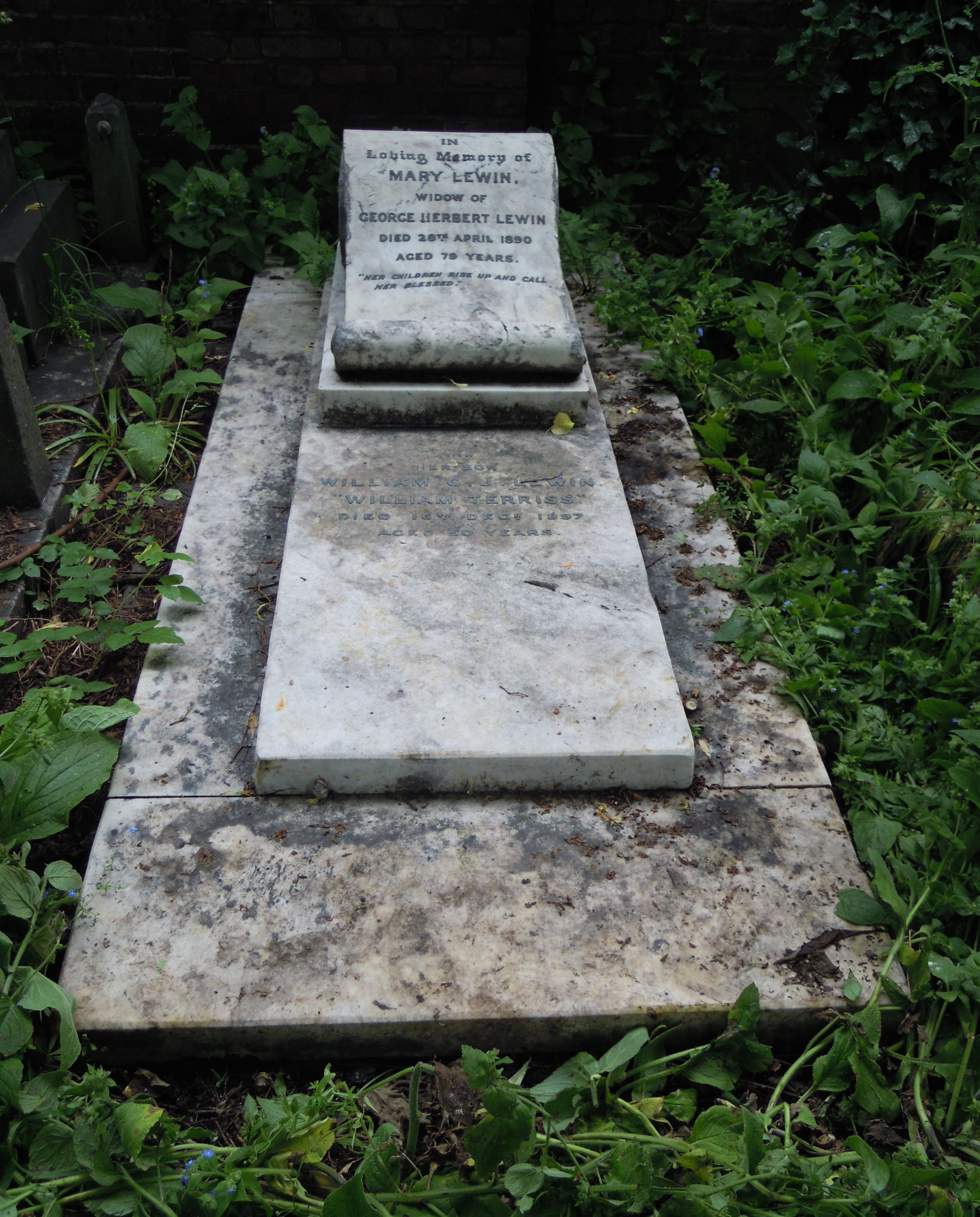
Terriss mentioned on his mother's grave in Brompton Cemetery

Terriss was buried in Brompton Cemetery, London on 21 December. A lifeboat house was built in 1898 on Eastbourne seafront in his memory and bears a memorial plaque. There is also a plaque on the wall by the stage door of the Adelphi Theatre recording his murder. The Terriss Theatre in Rotherhithe, built in 1899, was named after him. It became the Rotherhithe Hippodrome in 1907 but was demolished in 1955; the site is now the Rotherhithe Free Church.

A portrait of Terriss hangs in the stairwell of Denville Hall, the home for retired Actors and Actresses in Northwood, London, England. The home is run by The Actors' Charitable Trust. Henry Irving was the first President of the organisation until his death in 1905.

A fictionalised version of Terriss's murder, The Star of the Adelphi, was broadcast in 2002 on BBC Radio 4 as part of The Further Adventures of Sherlock Holmes.

== Ghost ==
Legend has it that Terriss's ghost haunts Covent Garden tube station and the Adelphi Theatre. A 2005 Channel 5 documentary on ghosts on the London Underground reported that a ghost has been seen many times at the Covent Garden tube station, identified from a photograph as Terriss, though sightings have lessened over the years. A 2008 documentary, Ghosts on the Underground, produced by The History Channel, mentions a recent sighting of Terriss at Covent Garden Underground station, which was built after Terriss's death.

== Genealogy ==
Grote-Lewin Family Tree

Richard Lewin (7 issue)	Mary Brown
George Grote	Thomas Lewin (12 issue)	Mary Hale
John Grote	Arthur Grote	George Grote	Harriet Grote	George Herbert Lewin	Mary Friend
Margaret Elliot Lewin	Thomas Herbert Lewin	Mary Lewin	Harriet Browne	William Terriss	Isabella Stevenson	Friend “Bob” Lewin
Everest MacDonald	Charles Lewin	Audrey Waterhouse
Ellaline Terriss	Tom Terriss

== Sources ==
- Goodman, Jonathan. Acts of Murder. Foreword by Richard Briers (London: Harrap Ltd., A Futura Book, 1986), pp. 1–71. ISBN 0-7088-3603-8.
- Rowell, George. William Terriss and Richard Prince: Two Characters in an Adelphi Melodrama (1987; London: Society for Theatre Research) ISBN 0-85430-042-2
- Shearer, Moira (1999). Ellen Terry. Phoenix Mill: Sutton Publishing. ISBN 0-7509-1526-9.
- Smythe, Arthur J. The Life of William Terriss, Actor (Westminster: Archibald Constable, 1898). OCLC Number: 253652912
