= The Further Adventures of Sherlock Holmes =

British radio drama series

- Clive Merrison and Andrew Sachs
- Genre: Radio drama
- Country of origin: United Kingdom
- Home station: BBC Radio 4
- Starring: Clive Merrison; Andrew Sachs
- Original release: 30 January 2002 – 4 April 2010
- No. of episodes: 16

The Further Adventures of Sherlock Holmes is a series of radio dramas based on Arthur Conan Doyle's detective Sherlock Holmes. Written by Bert Coules as a pastiche of Doyle's work, the series was broadcast on BBC Radio 4 in 2002, 2004, 2008–2009 and 2010. There are sixteen episodes, all of them produced and directed by Patrick Rayner of BBC Scotland. Clive Merrison stars as Holmes, having portrayed the detective in a 1989–1998 BBC radio series of dramatisations of every Sherlock Holmes story by Doyle (the first actor to do so). Andrew Sachs appears as Dr. Watson, replacing Michael Williams after Williams died following the Radio 4 run of Sherlock Holmes adaptations. Each of the stories is based on a throwaway reference from an actual Doyle short story or novel. The first two series are repeated regularly on BBC Radio 4 Extra.

The 2010 episode "The Marlbourne Point Mystery: Part Two" brings to eighty the number of episodes in which Clive Merrison has played Sherlock Holmes on BBC Radio 4.

== Main cast ==
- Sherlock Holmes – Clive Merrison
- Dr John Watson – Andrew Sachs

== Overview ==
=== Series 1 ===
No. overall	No. in series	Episode title	First broadcast
1	1	"The Madness of Colonel Warburton"	30 January 2002
2	2	"The Star of the Adelphi"	6 February 2002
3	3	"The Peculiar Persecution Of Mr John Vincent Harden"	13 February 2002
4	4	"The Singular Inheritance of Miss Gloria Wilson"	20 February 2002
5	5	"The Saviour of Cripplegate Square"	27 February 2002

=== Series 2 ===
No. overall	No. in series	Episode title	First broadcast
6	1	"The Abergavenny Murder"	18 May 2004
7	2	"The Shameful Betrayal of Miss Emily Smith"	25 May 2004
8	3	"The Tragedy of Hanbury Street"	1 June 2004
9	4	"The Determined Client"	8 June 2004
10	5	"The Striking Success of Miss Franny Blossom"	15 June 2004

=== Series 3 ===
No. overall	No. in series	Episode title	First broadcast
11	1	"The Remarkable Performance Of Mr Frederick Merridew"	26 December 2008
12	2	"The Eyes Of Horus"	2 January 2009
13	3	"The Thirteen Watches"	9 January 2009
14	4	"The Ferrers Documents"	16 January 2009

=== Series 4 ===
No. overall	No. in series	Episode title	First broadcast
15	1	"The Marlbourne Point Mystery - Part 1"	5 April 2010
16	2	"The Marlbourne Point Mystery - Part 2"	6 April 2010

== Episodes ==
=== Series One ===
==== The Madness of Colonel Warburton ====
First transmitted 30 January 2002, this story is based on a reference from Doyle's short story "The Adventure of the Engineer's Thumb": "There were only two [cases] which I was the means of introducing to his notice—that of Mr. Hatherley’s thumb, and that of Colonel Warburton’s madness."

Watson's old commanding officer is alarming his family with his interest in spiritualism.

Additional cast
- Colonel Warburton – Timothy West
- Mrs Bessmer – Eleanor Bron
- Mr Bessmer – Struan Rodger
- Michael Warburton – Jamie Newall
- Sir Robert – David Bannerman
- Mrs Fryer – Clare Corbett

==== The Star of the Adelphi ====
First transmitted 6 February 2002, this story is based on a reference from Doyle's short story "The Adventure of the Second Stain": "You must have observed, Watson, how she manoeuvred to have the light at her back. She did not wish us to read her expression...You remember the woman at Margate whom I suspected for the same reason. No powder on her nose—that proved to be the correct solution."

When a leading actor is stabbed to death, Holmes and Watson step behind the scenes into a world of pretence and deception.

This story is based on the actual murder of actor-manager William Terriss by Richard Prince outside London's Adelphi Theatre on 16 December 1897.

Additional cast
- Prince – John Bett
- Graves – Philip Anthony
- Terriss – Andrew Wincott
- Mrs Terriss – Richenda Carey
- Mrs Charlton – Jasmine Hyde
- Mr Charlton – David Bannerman
- Jessie – Helen Ayres

==== The Peculiar Persecution of Mr John Vincent Harden ====
First transmitted 13 February 2002, this story is based on a reference from Doyle's short story "The Adventure of the Solitary Cyclist": "He was immersed at the moment in a very abstruse and complicated problem concerning the peculiar persecution to which John Vincent Harden, the well-known tobacco millionaire, had been subjected."

A mysterious metal object found in a dead man's stomach holds a vital clue to his death.

Additional cast
- Mrs Harden – Jane Asher
- Philips – David Thorpe
- Annie – Claire Corbett
- Smith — Peter Darney

==== The Singular Inheritance of Miss Gloria Wilson ====
First transmitted 20 February 2002, this story is based on a reference from Doyle's short story "The Problem of Thor Bridge": "Among these unfinished tales is that of Mr. James Phillimore, who, stepping back into his own house to get his umbrella, was never more seen in this world."

After years of apparent inactivity, master cat-burglar "The Ghost" is back with a series of thefts.

Additional cast
- Gloria Wilson – Toyah Willcox
- James Phillimore – Roy Hudd
- Inspector Athelney Jones – Siôn Probert
- Ringmaster – Sean Baker II

==== The Saviour of Cripplegate Square ====
First transmitted 27 February 2002, this story is based on a reference from Doyle's novel The Sign of the Four: "I assure you that the most winning woman I ever knew was hanged for poisoning three little children for their insurance-money..."

Holmes recalls a case from his past when the guidance of an extraordinary man helped solve a particularly diabolic crime.

Additional cast
- Collington Smith – Tom Baker
- Mrs Emily Guttridge – Siobhan Redmond
- Tobias Guttridge – David Holt
- Jenny Snell – Jasmine Hyde
- Doctor – Andrew Wincott
- Landlady – Helen Ayres

=== Series Two ===
==== The Abergavenny Murder ====
First transmitted on 18 May 2004, this story is based on a reference from Doyle's short story "The Adventure of the Priory School": "... the Abergavenny murder is coming up for trial."

Holmes and Watson can rarely have been faced with such an uncooperative and unusual client, and they have just forty minutes to find out what problem has brought him to 221B Baker Street before the heavy boots of the official police force start clumping up the stairs.

This episode is unique in the series in that it is performed in real time. The pre-credits is a Harold Pinter parody, complete with the lengthy pauses.

Additional cast
- The Client – Ioan Meredith

==== The Shameful Betrayal of Miss Emily Smith ====
First transmitted on 25 May 2004, this story is based on a reference from Doyle's short story "The Adventure of the Norwood Builder": "You remember that terrible murderer, Bert Stevens, who wanted us to get him off in ’87? Was there ever a more mild-mannered, Sunday-school young man?"

The murder of a young schoolmistress brings Holmes and Watson down to Kent. Emily Smith's body was found in the middle of a snow-covered field. But, strangely, her killer left no footprints.

Additional cast
- Bert Stevens – Mark Gatiss
- Inspector Dawkins – Christian Rodska
- Dr Trantor – Philip Fox
- Mrs Trantor – Rachel Atkins
- Alfred Laurenson – Chris Moran
- Emily Smith – Jaimi Barbakoff

==== The Tragedy of Hanbury Street ====
First transmitted on 1 June 2004, this story is based on a reference from Doyle's short story "The Adventure of the Golden Pince-Nez": "I see my notes upon the repulsive story of the red leech and the terrible death of Crosby, the banker."

Charlotte Adams is young, idealistic and happily absorbed in her volunteer work among the poor and suffering of the East End. So why should she kill herself?

Additional cast
- Mrs Adams – Lindsay Duncan
- Miss Wallace – Colette O'Neil
- Charlotte/Alice – Lydia Leonard
- Matthew Crosby/Dr Kelly – John Rowe
- Jonathan Crosby/Patient – Chris Moran
- Treeves/Card Sharp – Philip Fox
- Mrs Quilley – Frances Jeater

==== The Determined Client ====
First transmitted on 8 June 2004, this story is based on a reference from Doyle's short story "The Adventure of the Golden Pince-Nez": "Here also I find an account of the Addleton tragedy..."

One man lies dead, the other seriously wounded. But the resourceful Miss Addleton cannot believe the police's version of events, and engages Holmes to save her father's good name.

Additional cast
- Caroline Addleton – Fritha Goodey
- William Addleton – Ian Masters
- Thomas Addleton – Philip Fox
- Frederick Addleton – Rhys Meredith
- Mrs Sinden – Joanna McCallum
- Lawyer/Clarkson – John Rowe

==== The Striking Success of Miss Franny Blossom ====
First transmitted on 15 June 2004, this story is based on a reference from Doyle's novel The Hound of the Baskervilles: "Since the tragic upshot of our visit to Devonshire [Holmes] had been engaged in two affairs of the utmost importance, in the first of which he had exposed the atrocious conduct of Colonel Upwood in connection with the famous card scandal of the Nonpareil Club."

A body in Hyde Park and a potential scandal at an exclusive gambling club bring Holmes back into contact with a beguiling but most notorious former client.

Additional cast

- Colonel Upwood – Geoffrey Whitehead
- Mrs Ricoletti – Maggie Steed
- Inspector Lestrade – Stephen Thorne
- Harold Upwood – Scott Brooksbank
- Catterall – Philip Fox
- Nicholson – John Rowe
- The maid – Alice Hart

=== Series Three ===
==== The Remarkable Performance of Mr Frederick Merridew ====
First transmitted on 26 December 2008, this story is based on a reference from Doyle's short story "The Empty House": "'My collection of M’s is a fine one,' said [Holmes]. '...and here is...Merridew of abominable memory.'"

A night at the music hall ends in death, a Wild West sharpshooter finds a new personality, a brick wall crumbles and Holmes is engaged by a most unexpected client.

Additional cast

- Merridew – Hugh Bonneville
- Stamford – Malcolm Tierney
- Charlotte – Jill Cardo
- Fragson – Jonathan Tafler
- Flora – Donnla Hughes
- George – Stephen Critchlow

==== The Eyes of Horus ====
First transmitted on 2 January 2009, this story is based on a reference from Doyle's novel The Hound of the Baskervilles: "'Ah, Wilson, I see you have not forgotten the little case in which I had the good fortune to help you?'”

How could a priceless Egyptian antique vanish from a locked casket in a locked safety-deposit box in a locked vault in a locked bank? And why has the assistant manager disappeared?

Additional cast

- Lady Mallory – Colette O'Neil
- Lestrade – Stephen Thorne
- Lofting – Stephen Critchlow
- Wilson – Jonathan Tafler
- Mrs Hartnell – Janice Acquah
- Sergeant – Malcolm Tierney
- Constable – Paul Rider

==== The Thirteen Watches ====
First transmitted on 9 January 2009, this story is based on a reference from Doyle's short story "The Noble Bachelor" and also on his non-Holmes story "The Man with the Watches".

A series of inexplicable and bizarre incidents on a non-stop express train brings a railway baron to Baker Street and takes Holmes and Watson to Rugby.

Additional cast

- Inspector Athelney Jones – Siôn Probert
- Sir Gregory Backwater – Nigel Anthony
- James Harkness – Stuart Milligan
- Sam – Inam Mirza
- Ted – Robert Lonsdale
- Landlady – Donnla Hughes
- Sergeant – Dan Starkey

==== The Ferrers Documents ====
First transmitted on 16 January 2009, this story is based on a reference from Doyle's short story "The Priory School": "'I am retained in this case of the Ferrers Documents.'"

What could possibly link a slum landlord, a vanishing prostitute, and a break-in at 221B Baker Street? In a case with no leads, the most important clue is that there are no clues at all.

Additional cast

- Lestrade – Stephen Thorne
- Robert Ferrers – Jonathan Tafler
- Constable Dawkins – Thomas Arnold
- Alice – Donnla Hughes
- George – Gunnar Cauthery
- Mrs Radcliffe – Janice Acquah
- Shinwell Johnson – Dan Starkey

=== Series Four ===
==== The Marlbourne Point Mystery: Part One ====
First transmitted on 5 April 2010, this story is based on a reference from Doyle's short story "The Adventure of the Veiled Lodger": "I deprecate, however, in the strongest way the attempts which have been made lately to get at and to destroy these papers. The source of these outrages is known, and if they are repeated I have Mr. Holmes’s authority for saying that the whole story concerning the politician, the lighthouse, and the trained cormorant will be given to the public."

In which Holmes and Watson find themselves in unfamiliar but impressive surroundings and (in Holmes's case) in somewhat unusual but not at all unwelcome company. The detective gets a chance to use one of his less frequently aired foreign languages, the doctor gets the shock of his life, a policeman becomes a suspect, a brass band plays a part, and the safety of the Empire is secured by a remarkable bird...

Holmes refers to this case in the Series Two adventure "The Abergavenny Murder", calling it "The lighthouse, the politician and the trained cormorant ... tedious little case, that."

Additional cast

- Mycroft Holmes – James Laurenson
- Constable Powell – Piers Wehner
- Sir Charles Steele – Nigel Hastings
- Mrs Chang – Pik-Sen Lim
- Harold Jefferstone – Joseph Cohen-Cole
- Mr Jefferstone – Bruce Alexander
- Mr Lade – Richard Dillane
- Elizabeth – Tessa Nicholson

==== The Marlbourne Point Mystery: Part Two ====
First transmitted on 6 April 2010.

The enigmatic Mycroft Holmes astonishes his brother as the shocking truth behind the mystery of the politician, the lighthouse and the trained cormorant is finally revealed.

Additional cast

as for Part One and,

- Postmaster – Bert Coules

== Recordings ==
Cover of the cassette release of four episodes from Series One.

Cover of the CD release of Volume 2.

Four of the episodes of each of the first two series were released on cassette and compact disc by the BBC Radio Collection in 2002 and 2004. The recordings of the first series omit the episode "The Peculiar Persecution of Mr John Vincent Harden." The recordings of the second series omit the episode "The Striking Success of Miss Franny Blossom." The compact disc release of the second series also features a bonus interview with Bert Coules at the conclusion of disc four.

The two unreleased episodes from the first two series were released in January 2009 in a third box set along with "The Thirteen Watches" and "The Ferrers Documents" from series three. The fourth set, released in April 2010 contains the two remaining stories from series three, "The Remarkable Performance of Mr Frederick Merridew" and "The Eyes of Horus" along with the new two-part story "The Marlbourne Point Mystery".
