= Charles Millward =

English musician, composer, and actor (1830–1892)

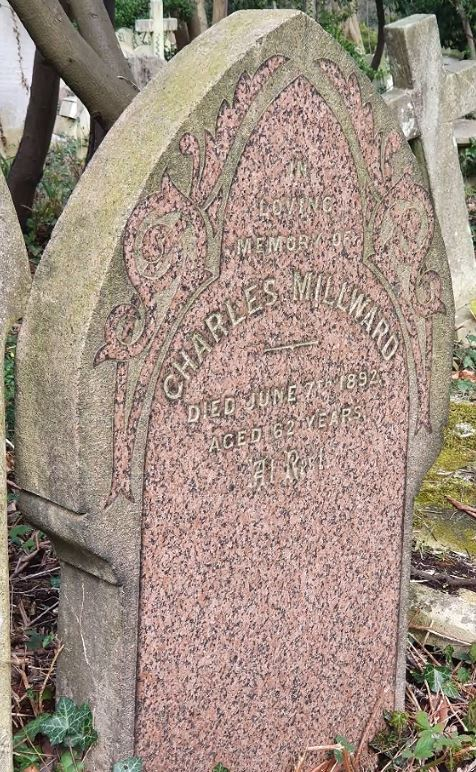
Grave of Charles Millward in Highgate Cemetery

Charles Millward (1830–1892) was an English musician, composer, actor, journal proprietor and monumental mason.

== Biography ==
Charles Millward was a prolific composer of pantomimes and comic opera. He collaborated with W. S. Gilbert (1836–1911) on Hush-a-Bye, Baby, on the Tree Top, or, Harlequin Fortunia, King Frog of Frog Island, and the Magic Toys of Lowther Arcade (1866).

Charles Millward was a member of the Savage Club and was father of English actress Jessie Millward (1861–1932).

He also had a successful monumental masonry business. He died in 1892 and was buried in Highgate Cemetery.

== Works ==
- Hush-a-Bye, Baby, on the Tree Top, or, Harlequin Fortunia, King Frog of Frog Island, and the Magic Toys of Lowther Arcade (1866)
- Ride a Cock Horse to Banbury Cross (1874)
