= Jessie Millward =

English actress (1861–1932)

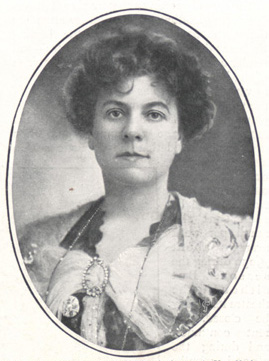
Portrait of Jessie Millward from The London magazine, c. 1900

Jessie Millward (1861 – July 13, 1932) was an English stage actress known for her performances both in Britain and the United States. She played roles in Shakespeare and other classic plays, as well as melodramas and other contemporary works.

== Life and career ==
William Terriss and Millward in The Harbour Lights (1880s)

Millward's father was Charles Millward, a well known pantomime writer of the 1860s and 1870s. Jessie made her acting debut in 1881 in London. She first appeared with actor Henry Irving the following year, and performed many times with Irving's theatre company, mostly in Shakespeare, over the next three years, and occasionally thereafter, remaining friends with Irving.

In costume as Anne Chute (The Colleen Bawn)

In 1885, Millward played Fanny Tower in Arrah-na-Pogue and Anne Chute in The Colleen Bawn, both at the Adelphi Theatre, where a critic commented that she "acts Anne Chute with a native dash and spirit admirably fitted to the part." The same year, she met, and later became romantically involved with, William Terriss, with whom she first starred in the extraordinarily successful The Harbour Lights by George R. Sims and Henry Pettitt (1885–1886). Terriss and Millward were further engaged at the Adelphi in its melodramas, beginning with The Bells of Haslemere (1887). Millward and Terriss remained frequent stage partners. In 1889–90, and again in 1893–94, Terriss and Millward toured in the US with Irving. Terriss was murdered outside the Adelphi in 1897. She performed for several years from 1890 at the Theatre Royal, Drury Lane.

She played in the United States many more times, by invitation of producer Charles Frohman. Her many Broadway roles included the title role in Phroso in 1898, Lady Algy in Lord and Lady Algy in 1899, Countess Zicka in Diplomacy in 1901 and Clara in The Girl in the Taxi in 1910.

In 1907, she married actor John Glendinning. Millward published an autobiography in 1923, Myself and Others.
