= Richard Archer Prince =

British actor (1858–1937)

Richard Archer Prince in 1885

Richard Archer Prince (11 May 1858– 25 January 1937), also known as William Archer Flint, was an actor who murdered another actor, William Terriss, outside the Adelphi Theatre in London in December 1897.

== Biography ==
Prince was born Richard Millar Archer near Dundee, Scotland, one of nine children from the two marriages of his ploughman father David Archer. His mother Margaret Archer was his father's second wife. His mother later blamed his mental instability on having left him in the sun as a baby while she was working in a field. She claimed that he was never right afterwards. Prince was not a good scholar and attended school until he was 14 when he went to work at a shipbuilder's. In the evenings he appeared as a supernumerary at a local theatre. In about 1875 his parents went to London where Prince afterwards joined them. Aspiring to become an actor, by 1887 he was appearing in small named-roles in the London theatres including the Adelphi.

William Terriss was one of the leading actors of the time. By the 1890s Terriss and Prince had become acquainted. Prince thought he was a better actor than he actually was and consequently was often down on his luck. Terriss helped the struggling younger actor to find work in various productions that he had a hand in. However, Prince had, over the years, increasingly abused alcohol and become mentally unstable, becoming known as Mad Archer. During the run of The Harbour Lights, in which Prince had a minor role, Terriss took offence at something that Prince had said about him and had Prince dismissed. Terriss, however, sent small sums of money to Prince, via the Actors' Benevolent Fund, and continued to try to find him acting work. When he could not get acting work Prince would return to Dundee to work as a labourer, which he did periodically between May 1895 and July 1897.

The murder of William Terriss by Prince as depicted in The Illustrated Police News (1897)

By the end of 1897, Prince was destitute and desperate for work, but he had become unemployable. On 13 December he was forcibly ejected from the foyer of the Vaudeville Theatre after trying to gain free admission with a pass from the Adelphi Theatre to which he was no longer entitled; he and Terriss were seen to argue the next night in Terriss's dressing room in the Adelphi. Prince became increasingly convinced that Terriss was actively preventing him from getting acting work and he developed a bitter attitude towards the more successful actor. On 16 December 1897 Prince asked for money at the Fund's office but was told that his request could not be considered that day. He then concealed himself in a doorway across the street from the Adelphi Theatre's stage door in Maiden Lane and waited for Terriss. As Terriss was arriving to prepare for the evening's performance Prince rushed across the street and stabbed him in the back, side and chest with a butcher's knife he had recently purchased. When captured, Prince told police, "I did it for revenge. He had kept me out of employment for ten years, and I had either to die in the street or kill him." Terriss, who had collapsed just within the stage door, died shortly after the stabbing.

The murder became a sensation in the London press. Prince appeared at the Old Bailey on 13 January 1898. He initially pleaded "guilty with provocation" but changed this on the advice of his counsel to not guilty. Prince, aware of his notoriety, made the most of the attention. An insanity defence was argued, with doctors and even his mother giving evidence that he was of unsound mind. The jury pronounced Prince "guilty, but according to the medical evidence, not responsible for his actions", a verdict provided for under the Trial of Lunatics Act 1883 which would lead to indefinite detention. He was thus transferred from Holloway Prison to Broadmoor Criminal Lunatic Asylum and became involved in entertainment for the inmates and conducted the prison orchestra until his death from natural causes in January 1937 aged 79. His relatively mild sentence was met with anger by the theatrical community, and Sir Henry Irving would later be quoted as saying "Terriss was an actor, so his murderer will not be executed."
