= W. S. Gilbert bibliography =

This is a selected list of W. S. Gilbert's works, including all that have their own Wikipedia articles. For a complete list of Gilbert's dramatic works, see List of W. S. Gilbert dramatic works.

== Poetry ==
- The Bab Ballads, a collection of comic verse published roughly between 1865 and 1871
- Songs of a Savoyard, London: George Routledge and Sons, 1890, a collection of Gilbert's song lyrics

== Selected short stories ==
- Foggerty's Fairy and Other Tales, a collection of short stories and essays, mainly from before 1874.
- Gilbert, W. S. (2018). Andrew Crowther (ed.). The Triumph of Vice and Other Stories. Alma Classics. ISBN 978-1-84-749754-3.
- Links to several Gilbert stories

Publications that include one or more of Gilbert's short stories that are not in Foggerty's Fairy and Other Tales

- Gilbert, W. S. (1985). Peter Haining (ed.). The Lost Stories of W.S. Gilbert. London(?): Robson Books. ISBN 9780860513377.
- Belgravia, vol. 2 (1867). "From St. Paul's to Piccadilly", pp. 67–74
- Fun, vol. 1 new series (1865–1866) (several contributions by Gilbert; near end of volume, Fun Christmas Number 1865, with Gilbert's "The Astounding Adventure of Wheeler J. Calamity", pp. 17–18)
- London Society, vol. 13 (1868) (three "Thumbnail Sketches" by Gilbert, pp. 50–57, 132–136, 315–319)
- On the Cards: Routledge's Christmas Annual (1867) ("Diamonds," pp. 25–37, and "The Converted Clown", pp. 137–139)

== Other books ==
- The Pinafore Picture Book, London: George Bell & Sons, 1908, retelling the story of H.M.S. Pinafore for children, in prose narrative form
- The Story of The Mikado, London: Daniel O'Connor, 1921, a similar retelling of The Mikado for children

== Plays and musical stage works ==
Selected stage works that were important to Gilbert's career or were otherwise notable, in chronological order by date of premiere, excluding those listed under other headings below:

- Dulcamara, or the Little Duck and the Great Quack (1866 musical spoof of Donizetti's L'elisir d'amore). Gilbert's first solo success for the theatre, and the first of his five "operatic burlesques".
- La Vivandière (1867), a parody of Donizetti's La figlia del regimento
- Harlequin Cock Robin and Jenny Wren (1867), a Christmas pantomime.
- The Merry Zingara (1868), a parody of Michael Balfe's The Bohemian Girl
- Robert the Devil (1868), a parody of Meyerbeer's Robert le diable. One of Gilbert's most successful early plays, it opened the Gaiety Theatre, London and ran in the provinces for 3 years.
- The Pretty Druidess (1869), a parody of Norma – the last of Gilbert's five "operatic burlesques"
- An Old Score (1869) (rewritten as "Quits!" in 1872) Gilbert's first full-length comedy.
- The Princess (1870). Musical farce; the precursor to Princess Ida.
- The Palace of Truth (1870). The first of Gilbert's blank verse "Fairy Comedies".
- Creatures of Impulse (1871), with music by Alberto Randegger, based on Gilbert's 1870 short story called "A Strange Old Lady".
- Pygmalion and Galatea (1871). Gilbert's most successful work up to this time. A reinterpretation of the Pygmalion myth in which the innocent former statue, Galatea, is unable to bear the cynicism and jealousies of the real world.
- Randall's Thumb (1871). A comedy that opened the Royal Court Theatre.
- The Wicked World (1873). A fairy comedy about how mortal love upsets the fairy world.
- The Happy Land (1873). This work was briefly banned for its sharp satire of government ministers. It also travesties The Wicked World.
- The Realm of Joy (1873). Set in the box office of a thinly-disguised The Happy Land, it satirises the audience for scandalous plays and the Lord Chamberlain's censorship of plays.
- The Wedding March (1873) a farce adapted from Un Chapeau de Paille d'Italie by Eugène Labiche
- Rosencrantz & Guildenstern (published 1874, performed 1891). Gilbert's burlesque of Hamlet.
- Charity (1874). Concerns Victorian attitudes towards sex outside of marriage. Anticipates the 1890s "problem plays" of Shaw, Ibsen.
- Sweethearts (1874). A drama about love revisited after 30 years.
- Tom Cobb (1875). This was possibly one of Gilbert's best comedies.
- Broken Hearts (1875). The last of Gilbert's "fairy comedies", this was one of Gilbert's favourite plays.
- Dan'l Druce, Blacksmith (1876). A three-act drama that introduced antecedents of some of Gilbert's later characters.
- Engaged (1877). Probably the most famous of Gilbert's non-Sullivan works for the theatre.
- The Ne'er-do-Weel (1878); rewritten as "The Vagabond" after a few weeks. Friendship, sacrifice and rotating lovers: it unsuccessfully combined sentimental scenes with comedy.
- The Forty Thieves (1878). An "amateur pantomime at the Gaiety," written with three other writers, in which WSG played Harlequin.
- Gretchen (1879). One of Gilbert's favorites – his take on the Faust legend.
- Foggerty's Fairy (1881). Gilbert's Back to the Future play.
- Comedy and Tragedy (1884). A one-act afterpiece written for a revival of Pygmalion and Galatea.
- Brantinghame Hall (1888), a drama. Gilbert's biggest flop, it sent producer Rutland Barrington into bankruptcy.
- The Fortune Hunter (1897). Not a good play; its reception provoked WSG to announce retiring from writing for the stage.
- The Fairy's Dilemma (1904). WSG finally works out a lifelong obsession with pantomime and harlequinade.
- The Hooligan (1911). Gilbert's last play, written in a new, serious style.

== German Reed Entertainments ==
Gilbert wrote six one-act musical entertainments for the German Reeds between 1869 and 1875. They were successful in their own right and also helped form Gilbert's mature style as a dramatist. These include:

- No Cards (1869)
- Ages Ago (1869). Gilbert's first collaboration with Frederic Clay, and his first hit with the German Reeds, running for 350 performances.
- Our Island Home (1870)
- A Sensation Novel (1871)
- Happy Arcadia (1872)
- Eyes and No Eyes (1875)

== Early comic operas ==
- The Gentleman in Black (1870; music by Frederic Clay). The score is lost.
- Les Brigands (1871), an English adaptation of Jacques Offenbach's operetta.
- Topsyturveydom (1874; music by Alfred Cellier). This one-act operetta concerns a country that is the opposite of England. The score is lost.
- Princess Toto (1876; music by Frederic Clay). A three-act opera, Gilbert's last with Clay.

== The Gilbert and Sullivan operas ==
All of these comic operas are full-length two-act works, except for Trial by Jury, which is in one act, and Princess Ida, which is three acts. All except for Trial by Jury contain spoken dialogue; the dialogue in Princess Ida is written in blank verse.

- Thespis (1871)
- Trial by Jury (1875)
- The Sorcerer (1877)
- H.M.S. Pinafore (1878)
- The Pirates of Penzance (1879)
- Patience (1881)
- Iolanthe (1882)
- Princess Ida (1884)
- The Mikado (1885)
- Ruddigore (1887)
- The Yeomen of the Guard (1888)
- The Gondoliers (1889)
- Utopia, Limited (1893)
- The Grand Duke (1896)

== Later operas without Sullivan ==
Though not as popular as the works with Arthur Sullivan, a few of Gilbert's later comic operas arguably have stronger plots than the last two Gilbert and Sullivan operas.

- The Mountebanks (1892; music by Alfred Cellier). This is the "lozenge plot" that Sullivan declined to set on several occasions.
- Haste to the Wedding (1892; music by George Grossmith). An unsuccessful adaptation of The Wedding March.
- His Excellency (1894; with music by Osmond Carr). Gilbert felt that if Sullivan had set it, the piece would have been "another Mikado".
- Fallen Fairies (1909; music by Edward German). Gilbert's last opera, which was a failure.

== Parlour ballads ==
Gilbert is known to have written lyrics for twelve parlour ballads. These are:

- "The Yarn of the Nancy Bell", with music by Alfred Plumpton. One of the Bab Ballads. Published by Charles Jeffreys in 1869.
- "Thady O'Flynn", with music by James L. Molloy. Published by Boosey & Co on 7 October 1868. From No Cards.
- "Would You Know that Maiden Fair", with music by Frederic Clay. From Ages Ago. Published by Boosey c. 1869.
- "Corisande", with music by James L. Molloy. Published by Boosey on 18 June 1870.
- "Eily's Reason", with music by James L. Molloy. Published by Boosey on 27 February 1871.
- Three songs from A Sensation Novel: "The Detective's Song", "The Tyrannical Bridegroom", and "The Jewel". Published by Hopwood & Co in 1871.
- "The Distant Shore", with music by Arthur Sullivan. Published by Chappell & Co on 18 December 1874.
- "The Love that Loves me Not", with music by Arthur Sullivan. Published by Novello, Ewer & Co in 1875.
- "Sweethearts", with music by Arthur Sullivan. Based on the play of the same name and used to promote it. Published by Chappell & Co in 1875.
- "Let Me Stay", with music by Walter Maynard. Published by Boosey on 13 December 1875. The same lyric was set by Edward German for Broken Hearts.

== See also ==
- List of W. S. Gilbert dramatic works
- List of musical compositions by Arthur Sullivan
