= List of W. S. Gilbert dramatic works =

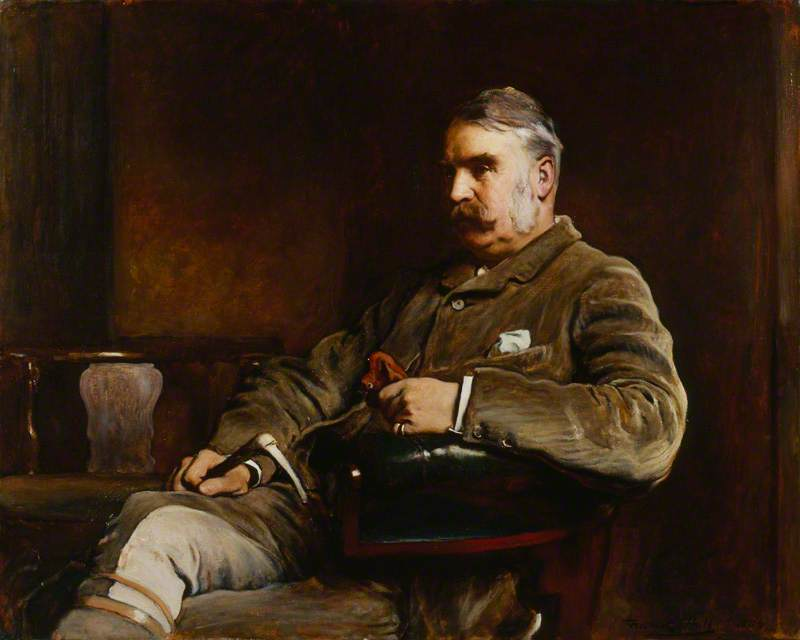
Sir William Schwenck Gilbert by Frank Holl (1886)

The dramatist and author W. S. Gilbert wrote approximately 80 dramatic works during his career, as well as light verse, short stories and other works. He is best remembered for his series of 14 libretti for his joint operatic works with the composer Arthur Sullivan, but many of his other dramatic works were popular successes.

== List ==
In the following list, the title of each work appears in the first column, along with any further information (such as the source of an adaptation). The genre appears in the second column, and if the piece had music, the composer's name is listed in parentheses. The theatre and date of first performance appear in the third and fourth columns. All theatres were in London, unless otherwise stated. The works are listed in the approximate order of composition. (In a few cases, the first performance was many years after the work was first published.)

Title	Genre	Theatre	Date
Uncle Baby	One-Act Comedietta	Lyceum Theatre	1863-10-31
Ruy Blas [published in Warne's Christmas Annual, 1866, based on the Victor Hugo drama, Ruy Blas.]	Burlesque	unperformed	N/A
Hush-a-Bye, Baby, on the Tree Top; or, Harlequin Fortunia, King Frog of Frog Island, and the Magic Toys of Lowther Arcade [written with Chas. Millard]	Pantomime	Astley's	1866-12-26
Dulcamara! or, The Little Duck and the Great Quack [parody of Donizetti's L'elisir d'amore]	Extravaganza	St. James's Theatre	1866-12-29
La Vivandière; or, True to the Corps! [parody of Donizetti's La fille du régiment]	Extravaganza	St. James's Hall, Liverpool	1867-06-15
Robinson Crusoe; or, The Injun Bride and the Injured Wife [written with H. J. Byron, Tom Hood, H. S. Leigh and Arthur Sketchley]	Burlesque	Haymarket	1867-07-06
Allow Me to Explain	One-Act Farce	Prince of Wales's Theatre	1867-11-04
Highly Improbable	One-Act Farce	Royalty Theatre	1867-12-05
A Colossal Idea [first pub. 1932]	One-Act Farce	unperformed	N/A
Harlequin Cock Robin and Jenny Wren; or, Fortunatus and the Water of Life, the Three Bears, the Three Gifts, the Three Wishes, and the Little Man who Woo'd the Little Maid	Pantomime	Lyceum	1867-12-26
The Merry Zingara; or, The Tipsy Gipsy and the Pipsy Wipsy [parody of Balfe's The Bohemian Girl]	Extravaganza	Royalty	1868-03-21
Robert the Devil; or, The Nun, the Dun, and the Son of a Gun [parody of Meyerbeer's Robert le diable]	Extravaganza	Gaiety Theatre	1868-12-21
No Cards	One-Act Musical Entertainment (Thomas German Reed/"Lionel Elliott"?)	Gallery of Illustration	1869-03-29
The Pretty Druidess; or, The Mother, the Maid, and the Mistletoe Bough [parody of Bellini's Norma]	Extravaganza	Charing Cross Theatre	1869-06-19
An Old Score [revived as Quits]	Three-Act Comedy	Gaiety	1869-07-26
Ages Ago	One-Act Musical Entertainment (Frederic Clay)	Gallery of Illustration	1869-11-22
A Medical Man [published in Clement Scott's Drawing-Room Plays (1870)]	One-Act Farce	St. George's Hall	1872-10-24
The Princess [based on Tennyson's poem]	Blank-Verse Parody	Olympic Theatre	1870-01-08
The Gentleman in Black	Two-Act Musical Play (Frederic Clay)	Charing Cross	1870-05-26
Our Island Home	One-Act Musical Entertainment (Thomas German Reed)	Gallery of Illustration	1870-06-20
The Palace of Truth	Three-Act Fairy Comedy	Haymarket	1870-11-19
The Brigands [translated and adapted from Les brigands by Meilhac and Halévy; published by Boosey, 1871]	Three-Act Comic Opera (Jacques Offenbach)	Theatre Royal, Plymouth	1889-09-02
Randall's Thumb	Three-Act Comedy	Court Theatre	1871-01-25
A Sensation Novel	Musical Entertainment in Three "Volumes" (Thomas German Reed)	Gallery of Illustration	1871-01-30
Creatures of Impulse	One-Act Musical Play (Alberto Randegger)	Court	1871-04-28
Great Expectations [adapted from the Dickens novel]	Drama	Court	1871-05-29
On Guard	Three-Act Melodramatic Comedy	Court	1871-10-28
Pygmalion and Galatea	Three-Act Fairy Comedy	Haymarket	1871-12-09
Thespis; or, The Gods Grown Old	Two-Act Comic Opera (Arthur Sullivan)	Gaiety	1871-12-26
Happy Arcadia	One-Act Musical Entertainment (Frederic Clay)	Gallery of Illustration	1872-10-28
The Wicked World	Three-Act Fairy Comedy	Haymarket	1873-01-04
The Happy Land [written as F. Tomline, with Gilbert à Beckett]	Two-Act Burlesque of The Wicked World	Court	1873-03-03
The Realm of Joy [written as F. Latour Tomline: freely adapted from Le Roi Candaule by Henri Meilhac and Ludovic Halévy; title changed after a few nights to The Realms of Joy]	One-Act Farce	Royalty	1873-10-18
The Wedding March [written as F. Latour Tomline: translated from Un Chapeau de Paille d'Italie by Eugène Labiche]	Three-Act Farce	Court	1873-11-15
Charity	Four-Act Drama	Haymarket	1874-01-03
Ought We To Visit Her? [adapted from the novel by Annie Edwardes]	Three-Act Drama	Royalty	1874-01-17
Committed For Trial [written as F. Latour Tomline: translated from Le Réveillon by Henri Meilhac and Ludovic Halévy]	Two-Act Farce	Globe Theatre	1874-01-24
The Blue-Legged Lady [no author named: translated from La Dame aux Jambes d'Azur by Eugène Labiche and Marc-Michel]	One-Act Farce	Court	1874-03-04
Topsyturveydom	One-Act Extravaganza (Alfred Cellier)	Criterion Theatre	1874-03-21
Sweethearts	Two-Act Comedy	Prince of Wales's Theatre	1874-11-07
Rosencrantz and Guildenstern [published in Fun, December 1874]	Burlesque in Three Short "Tableaux"	Vaudeville Theatre	1891-06-03
Trial by Jury	One-Act Comic Opera (Arthur Sullivan)	Royalty	1875-03-25
Tom Cobb; or, Fortune's Toy	Three-Act Farce	St. James's	1875-04-24
Eyes and No Eyes; or, The Art of Seeing	One-Act Musical Entertainment (Thomas German Reed)	St. George's Hall	1875-07-05
Broken Hearts	Three-Act Verse Drama	Court	1875-12-09
Princess Toto	Three-Act Comic Opera (Frederic Clay)	Theatre Royal, Nottingham	1876-06-24
Dan'l Druce, Blacksmith	Three-Act Drama	Haymarket	1876-09-11
On Bail [revised version of Committed for Trial]	Three-Act Farce	Criterion	1877-02-03
Engaged	Three-Act Farcical Comedy	Haymarket	1877-10-03
The Sorcerer	Two-Act Comic Opera (Arthur Sullivan)	Opera Comique	1877-11-17
The Forty Thieves [written with Robert Reece, F. C. Burnand, and H. J. Byron; three performances for charity]	Pantomime	Gaiety	1878-02-13
The Ne'er-Do-Weel [rewritten and restaged three weeks later as The Vagabond]	Three-Act Drama	Olympic	1878-02-25
H.M.S. Pinafore; or, The Lass that Loved a Sailor	Two-Act Comic Opera (Arthur Sullivan)	Opera Comique	1878-05-25
Gretchen [based on Goethe's Faust]	Four-Act Verse Tragedy	Olympic	1879-03-24
Lord Mayor's Day [translated from La Cagnotte by Eugène Labiche. Gilbert translated the first two acts, but was not credited.]	Three-Act Farce	Folly Theatre	1879-06-30
The Pirates of Penzance; or, The Slave of Duty	Two-Act Comic Opera (Arthur Sullivan)	Bijou, Paignton; Fifth Avenue, NY; and Opera Comique	1879-12-30 & 1879-12-31
Patience; or, Bunthorne's Bride	Two-Act Comic Opera (Arthur Sullivan)	Opera Comique	1881-04-23
Foggerty's Fairy	Three-Act Farce	Criterion	1881-12-15
Iolanthe; or, The Peer and the Peri	Two-Act Comic Opera (Arthur Sullivan)	Savoy Theatre	1882-11-25
Princess Ida; or, Castle Adamant [revised version of The Princess]	Three-Act Comic Opera (Arthur Sullivan)	Savoy	1884-01-05
Comedy and Tragedy	One-Act Drama	Lyceum	1884-01-26
The Mikado; or, The Town of Titipu	Two-Act Comic Opera (Arthur Sullivan)	Savoy	1885-03-14
Ruddygore; or, The Witch's Curse [retitled Ruddigore after a few days]	Two-Act Comic Opera (Arthur Sullivan)	Savoy	1887-01-22
The Yeomen of the Guard; or, The Merryman and his Maid	Two-Act Comic Opera (Arthur Sullivan)	Savoy	1888-03-10
Brantinghame Hall	Four-Act Drama	St. James's	1888-11-29
The Gondoliers; or, The King of Barataria	Two-Act Comic Opera (Arthur Sullivan)	Savoy	1889-07-12
The Mountebanks	Two-Act Comic Opera (Alfred Cellier)	Lyric Theatre	1892-01-04
Haste to the Wedding [operatic version of The Wedding March]	Three-Act Comic Opera (George Grossmith)	Criterion	1892-07-27
Utopia (Limited); or, The Flowers of Progress [retitled Utopia Limited after a few days]	Two-Act Comic Opera (Arthur Sullivan)	Savoy	1893-10-07
His Excellency	Two-Act Comic Opera (F. Osmond Carr)	Lyric	1894-10-27
The Grand Duke; or, The Statutory Duel	Two-Act Comic Opera (Arthur Sullivan)	Savoy	1896-03-07
The Fortune Hunter	Three-Act Drama	Theatre Royal, Birmingham	1897-09-27
Harlequin and the Fairy's Dilemma [retitled The Fairy's Dilemma after a few days]	Two-Act Domestic Pantomime	Garrick Theatre	1904-05-03
Fallen Fairies; or, The Wicked World [operatic version of The Wicked World]	Two-Act Comic Opera (Edward German)	Savoy	1909-12-15
The Hooligan	One-Act Drama	London Coliseum	1911-02-27
Trying a Dramatist; [published in Original Plays, Fourth Series (1911)]	One-Act Sketch	unknown	unknown

== See also ==
- List of musical compositions by Arthur Sullivan
- Bibliography of W.S. Gilbert
