= Foggerty's Fairy and Other Tales =

1890 book by W. S. Gilbert

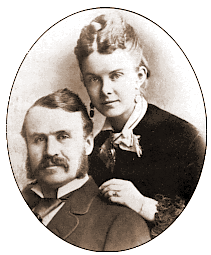
Gilbert and his wife, Lucy, in 1867

Foggerty's Fairy and Other Tales is an 1890 book by W. S. Gilbert, collecting several of the short stories and essays he wrote in his early career as a magazine writer (before 1874). A number of them were later adapted as plays or opera librettos.

Copyright problems dogged the book. It was pulled from market shortly after its publication, and is long out of print. Some of the stories were reprinted in the 1985 compilation, The Lost Stories of W. S. Gilbert. Some of the stories also served as the basis for a BBC Radio 4 series, "Gilbert without Sullivan."

== Contents and plot summaries ==
Foggerty's Fairy — First published as "The Story of a Twelfth Cake" in Graphic, Christmas Number, 1874 (retitled "Foggerty's Fairy" for the 1890 collection). A series of alternate histories of a somewhat roguish fellow, Freddy Foggerty, who is attempting to escape the consequences of having deserted the army some years previously. After meeting up with his former sergeant, he obtains the help of the titular fairy who allows him to undo events in his past. Unfortunately, though in the main timeline he has overcome his chequered past and become a respectable shop owner, in the alternate histories he turns out to have become a slave ship captain, a banker about to be arrested for fraud, and so on. Eventually, he returns to the original timeline: it turns out the sergeant hadn't recognised him, and everything ends happily. The play Foggerty's Fairy uses the same device of changing the past timeline with a completely different plot that doesn't require so many changes of scenery.

An Elixir of Love — First published in Graphic, Christmas Number, 1876. This story is the basis for The Sorcerer, and roughly similar in plot until the end. In the opera, the status quo is restored; in the story, Jenny (Aline in the opera) going off with the equivalent of Dr. Daly, and Stanley (Alexis) must live alone.

Johnny Pounce — First published as "The Key of the Strong Room" in book collection, A Bunch of Keys, Where They Were Found and What They Might Have Unlocked. Tom Hood's Christmas Book, 1865. (retitled "Johnny Pounce" for this collection).

Little Mim — First published in Graphic, Christmas Number, 1876

The Triumph of Vice — First published in book collection Savage Club Papers, 1867. A parody of fairy tales, with a penniless baron who works as a scrivener, his beautiful (but vain) daughter, an ugly (and almost as penniless) count staying with them who the baron's daughter detests, and an even uglier (but rich) gnome searching for a wife. The gnome has the power to turn temporarily into a handsome man three times, but rapidly returns to his ugliness. He has used up two times already courting other women, but turned so ugly between the time of engagement and the wedding that the women cried off. He engages the count to prepare the baron's daughter to be married to him immediately, on the day after the baron's daughter rejected the count, and motivated by revenge, he agrees. However, the gnome fails to pay him, and so he arranges to break his power over Bertha and (having got it in writing beforehand) marries her himself afterwards.

My Maiden Brief — First published in Cornhill magazine, 1863. A tale of a barrister who plans out his defence of a woman accused of stealing a purse with his roommate, and then has all his work end up for naught when his roommate is called to prosecute her.

Creatures of Impulse — First published as "A Strange Old Lady" in Graphic, Christmas Number 1870. It was retitled "Creatures of Impulse" for this collection and adapted as the 1871 play Creatures of Impulse (with music by Alberto Randegger). An ill-tempered old fairy refuses to leave her rooms at an inn where she is not wanted. She casts spells on a series of people to make them behave contrary to their usual natures, with comic consequences.

Maxwell and I — First published as "The Income Tax: Maxwell and I" in book collection Rates and Taxes (1866). Retitled "Maxwell and I" for this collection.

Actors, Authors, and Audiences — First published in Holly Leaves (Christmas number of the Illustrated Sporting and Dramatic News), Christmas 1880.

Angela: An Inverted Love Story — First published in The Illustrated Sporting and Dramatic News, Christmas Number 1887.

Wide Awake — First published in Mirth: a miscellany of wit and humour, no.1, 1878. Adapted as the play Tom Cobb (1875).

A Stage Play — First published in Hood's Comic Annual, 1873, pp. 98–103. This is popular among biographers of Gilbert, as it sets out his directorial style in detail.

The Wicked World — First published as "The Wicked World: an allegory", Hood's Comic Annual, 1871, pp. 82–90. Adapted as the play The Wicked World (1873), and later as the opera Fallen Fairies (1909). The plot of the story is roughly similar to that of the play, although told in a stream-of-consciousness style, with Gilbert wondering what to write, describing how he named characters, and so on. Unlike the play, love is allowed to triumph to some extent, instead of being thrown permanently out of fairyland.

The Finger of Fate — First published in Hood's Comic Annual, 1872, pp. 82–87.

A Tale of a Dry Plate — First published in The Illustrated Sporting and Dramatic News, Christmas Number, 1885. A short, somewhat melodramatic story of a photographer whose fiancée is lost at sea, leaving him with only an undeveloped photographic plate of her.

The Burglar's Story — First published in Holly Leaves (Christmas number of The Illustrated Sporting and Dramatic News), 8 December 1883. A burglar's apprentice is caught by a house-owner, who tries out his experimental plan for dealing with criminals: He forces the burglar to hand over his clothes, then tells him—indeed, insists—that he may leave.

Unappreciated Shakespeare — First published in the Illustrated Sporting and Dramatic News, Christmas Number, 1882).

Comedy and Tragedy — First published in The Stage Door (Routledge's Christmas Annual), 1879. Adapted as the play Comedy and Tragedy (1884).

Rosencrantz and Guildenstern — First published in Fun magazine in 1874. Adapted for the stage in 1891.

== See also ==
- Bibliography of W.S. Gilbert
- List of W. S. Gilbert dramatic works
