= Marion Terry =

English actress (1853–1930)

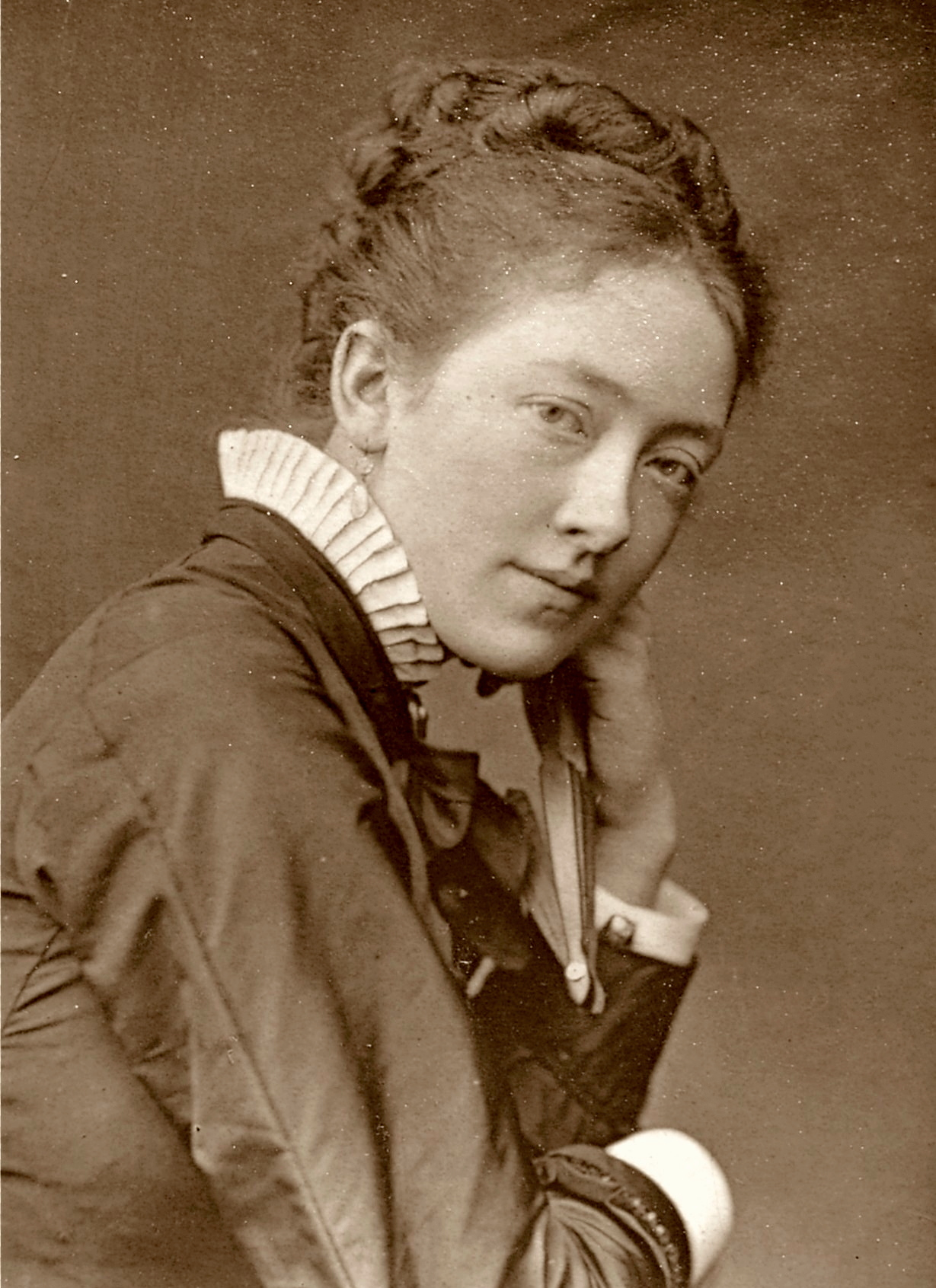
Marion Terry

Marion Bessie Terry (born Mary Ann Bessy Terry; 13 October 1853 – 21 August 1930) was an English actress. In a career spanning half a century, she played leading roles in more than 125 plays. Always in the shadow of her older and more famous sister Ellen, Terry nevertheless achieved considerable success in the plays of W. S. Gilbert, Oscar Wilde, Henry James and others.

== Biography ==
Terry was born in England, into a theatrical family. Her birth name was Mary Ann Bessy Terry, and she was nicknamed "Polly". Her parents, Benjamin (1818–1896), of Irish descent, and Sarah (née Ballard) (1819–1892), of Scottish ancestry, were comic actors in a touring company based in Portsmouth (where Sarah's father was a Wesleyan minister) and had eleven children. At least five of these became actors: Kate, Ellen, Marion, Florence and Fred. Two other children, George and Charles, were connected with theatre management.

Terry's sister Kate was a very successful actress until her marriage and retirement from the stage in 1867, and her sister Ellen became the greatest Shakespearean actress of her time. Her great nephew (Kate's grandson), Sir John Gielgud, became one of the twentieth century's most respected actors. Terry attended a boarding-school for girls at Sunnyside, Kingston upon Thames, together with her favourite sister, Florence.

=== Career ===
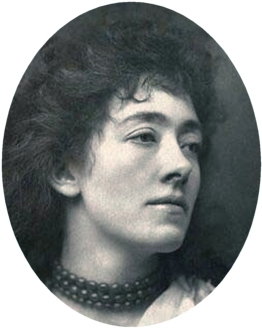
Marion Terry, c. 1880

Terry's first professional stage appearance was in July 1873 as Ophelia in a production of Hamlet directed by Tom Taylor in Manchester. Her first West End appearance came in October 1873 as Isabelle in a farce by John Maddison Morton, A Game of Romps at the Olympic Theatre, in the company of Henry Neville. This was followed by the role of Lady Valeria in Morton's All that Glitters Is Not Gold at the same theatre. In 1874, she was Hero in Shakespeare's Much Ado About Nothing at the Olympic. She then played a season at the Strand Theatre, and in 1875 appeared in Weak Woman by H. J. Byron.

Terry next joined the company at the Haymarket Theatre and became a protege of W. S. Gilbert, soon appearing in several of his plays, including Dan'l Druce, Blacksmith (1876) as Dorothy, The Palace of Truth (1876 revival), Pygmalion and Galatea (1877 revival) and Engaged (1877), creating the role of Belinda Treherne with great success. Critics praised her for her "deadpan" humor, and audiences were "helpless with laughter at her novel approach and immaculate timing". Also during that period, she first appeared in The Danischeffs, adapted by Lord Newry (1876), Fame by C. M. Rae (1877), Charles XII by James Planché (1877 revival), The Vagabond, by Gilbert (1878), Two Orphans (1878), The Crushed Tragedian, and My Little Girl by Dion Boucicault. In 1879 she moved to the Prince of Wales's Theatre under the management of the Bancrofts and then moved with the company to the Haymarket, performing in revivals of T. W. Robertson's comedies, including as Blanche Haye in Ours and Bella in School. In 1879 she also appeared as Mabel in Duty by James Albert and the title role in Gretchen by Gilbert.

Now an established actress, Terry continued to play leading roles in contemporary plays. She was Bathsheba in the stage adaptation of Far from the Madding Crowd by Thomas Hardy and J. Comyns Carr (1882). The same year, she starred with Lottie Venne and Johnston Forbes-Robertson in G. W. Godfrey's comedy The Parvenu at the Court Theatre. She substituted for her sister Ellen, who was ill, as Viola in Twelfth Night at the Lyceum Theatre in 1884. In 1885 she played in The Magistrate by Arthur Wing Pinero. In 1887, she joined the company of Herbert Beerbohm Tree first at the Comedy Theatre and then at the Haymarket. That year, she also appeared in The Ballad-Monger, by Walter Bessant. In February 1888, she starred in a revival of Gilbert's Broken Hearts. Later that year, she toured the British provinces with Henry Irving in another of her sister Ellen's roles, Margaret in Faust. She played Mrs. Erroll in The Real Little Lord Fauntleroy (1889), appeared in Cyrene by Alfred C. Calmour (1890), and appeared in 1891 in Sunlight and Shadow by R. C. Carton. She continued to tour with Irving's Lyceum company in the 1890s, as Rosamund in Alfred Lord Tennyson's Becket, as Portia in The Merchant of Venice (one of her sister's signature roles), and again as Margaret.

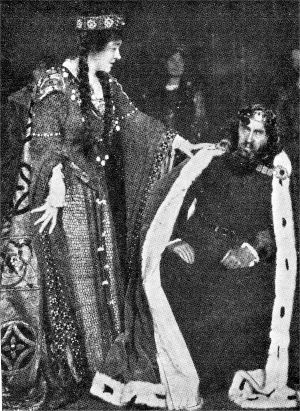
Terry and W. S. Gilbert in Rosencrantz and Guildenstern (1908)

=== Later years ===
In 1892 Terry played perhaps her most famous role, Mrs. Erlynne in Lady Windermere's Fan, by Oscar Wilde, at the St James's Theatre. This was followed by Hetty in The Cotton King by Sutton Vane Sr. (1893). In 1895, she appeared in Alabama by Augustus Thomas, in the title role in Delia Harding by J. Comyns Carr, and as Mrs. Peverel in Guy Domville by Henry James. In 1900 she played the roles of Rosalind and Portia at the Stratford festival. She was Nina in Forgiveness by J. Comyns Carr (1901), the title role in Eleanor by Mrs. Humphry Ward (1902), Susan Throssell in Quality Street by J. M. Barrie (1902), and Audrie in Michael and His Lost Angel by Henry Arthur Jones, among many other engagements.

In 1907, Terry performed in a Royal Command Performance of the 1855 Tom Taylor play, Still Waters Run Deep, together with Charles Wyndham, before King Edward VII. She played Hamlet's mother in a 1908 revival of Gilbert's parody of Hamlet, Rosencrantz and Guildenstern. She toured in America and Canada in 1908 and 1909. Her last role was the Principessa della Cercola in Our Betters at the Globe by Somerset Maugham in 1923, fifty years after her first professional appearance. Suffering from arthritis and other ailments, she retired from the stage. In her last years, Terry lived in Paddington, after having lived for many years at Buckingham Palace Mansions.

Terry died at her home in 1930, aged 76, of a cerebral haemorrhage and was buried at St Albans cemetery. She never married and, intensely private offstage, nothing is known of her romantic life. She left an estate of more than £12,000.

== See also ==
- Terry family
