= Gretchen (play) =

Tragic play by W. S. Gilbert

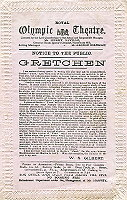
Original 1879 programme

Gretchen is a tragic four-act play, in blank verse, written by W. S. Gilbert in 1878–79 based on Goethe's version of part of the Faust legend.

The play was first performed at the Olympic Theatre on 24 March 1879. The piece starred Marion Terry in the title role, H. B. Conway as Faustus and Frank Archer as Mephisto. The play was not a success and closed after about 18 performances on 12 April 1879.

== Background ==
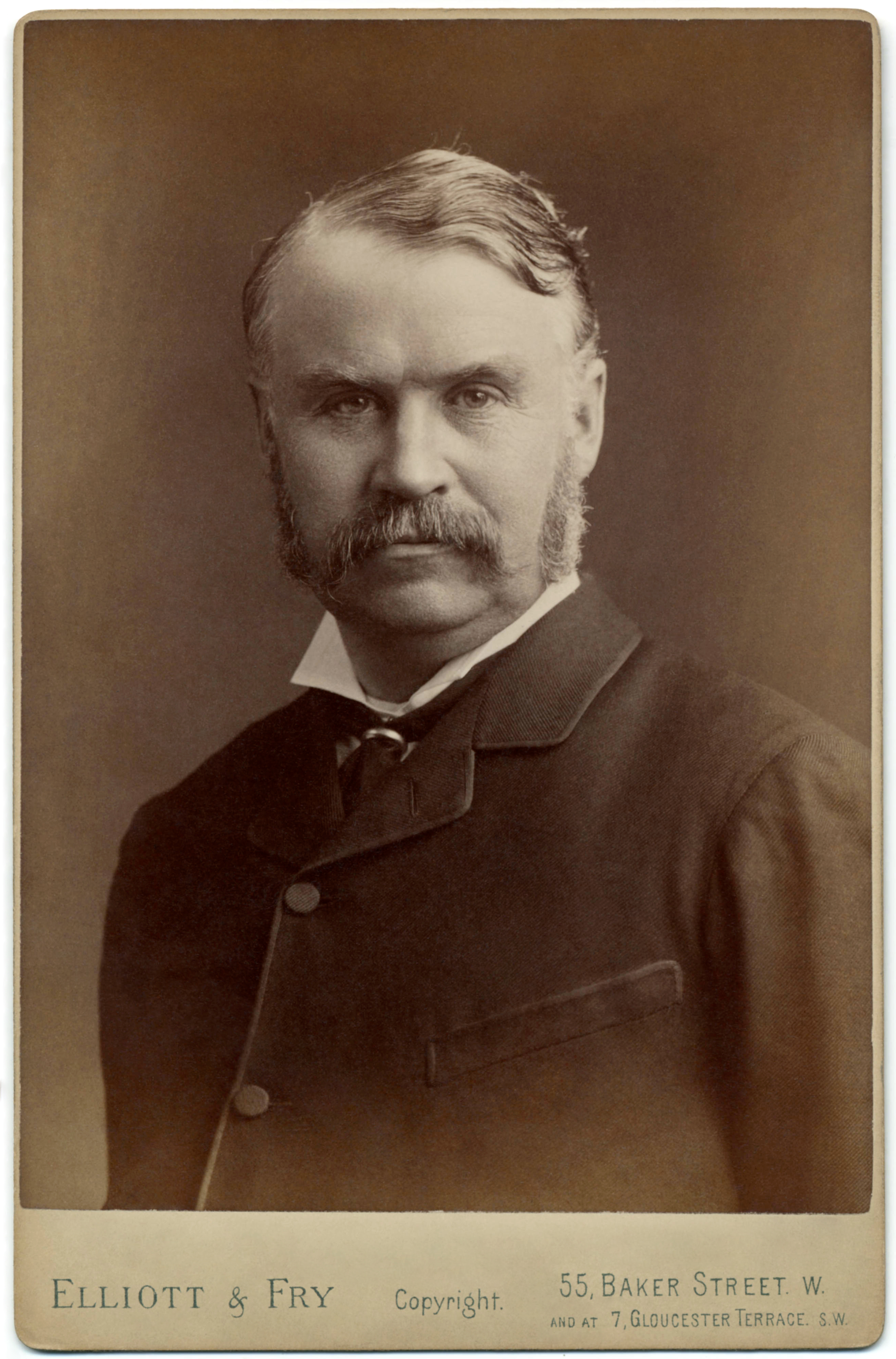
Cabinet card of W.S. Gilbert in about 1880 by Elliott & Fry

Gilbert and Sullivan produced their hit comic opera H.M.S. Pinafore in May 1878, and Gilbert turned to Gretchen as his next project. Gilbert was by then one of the most famous playwrights in England, but he was known more for comedies than dramas, and so Gretchen was anticipated with much curiosity. Although Gilbert had met with some success in earlier dramas, his last such piece, The Ne'er-do-Weel (also at the Olympic), had met with a difficult reception in 1878.

Gilbert was inspired to write Gretchen after seeing a picture called "Regrets", showing two priests, one of whom looks wistfully at a pair of lovers. He began to study Goethe's Faust in April 1878 and was ready to show his plot outline to Henry Neville, manager of the Olympic Theatre, in June 1878. Gilbert worked for a total of ten months on the play. He finished writing the play in December 1878 but did not agree with Neville on many production details, including which set and costume designers to use and some of the casting decisions. The cover of the theatre programme carried a lengthy note by Gilbert earnestly explaining that he was not attempting to put Faust on stage in its entirety, but simply to "re-model... the story of Gretchen's downfall". Gilbert's version of the story differs from most Faust tellings in that Faust makes no agreement with the Devil. The Devil shows him a vision of Gretchen, and Gretchen sees Faust in a dream before she meets him. The Devil, in Gilbert's version, becomes a mere anticlerical raisonneur.

Gretchen lasted only three weeks, although it was given in America in 1886, with May Fortescue in the title role. After the failure of Gretchen, Gilbert concentrated on the highly profitable Savoy Operas, writing only a few more plays during the rest of his life.

== Reception ==
Gilbert wrote, in an introductory "Notice" to the printed version, that the play "was received with exceptional favour by a crowded house", and that the theatre manager had not given the play a chance by closing it so soon, when it had premiered during Lent. The box-office receipts fell off sharply after an enthusiastic opening. He later told an interviewer: "I consider the two best plays I ever wrote were Broken Hearts and a version of the Faust legend called Gretchen. I took immense pains over my Gretchen, but it only ran a fortnight. I wrote it to please myself, and not the public." He also later remarked, "I called it Gretchen, the public called it rot." The Sunday Times praised Gilbert's "scathing" satire and "powerful" versification, but other reviews were mixed. The Times gave the play a long and respectful notice, The Observer praised the play but was lukewarm about most of the acting, and The Manchester Guardian called Gretchen "Little better than a travesty.... Some admirably written blank verse is the only merit which the play possesses." Reviewing the play's 1886 American production, The New York Times did not judge it to be among Gilbert's best, although the paper did find the treatment of the Faust story interesting, with many novel touches.

== Synopsis ==
Faustus is a monk who had once been a soldier. He had fallen in love with a woman who left him for a wealthier man. Faustus joins the Church to escape from women and the world. Soon, he realises that his life in monastic isolation is a hollow sham, and he desires to live in the real world, though he is still completely disillusioned with it. Mephisto, the Devil, shows him a vision of a truly pure woman – Gretchen. Faustus returns to the world to seek her. Gretchen dreams of Faustus, and her cousin Gottfried, who wishes to marry her, entrusts her to the care of Faustus when he marches to war. When Faustus and Gretchen meet, they are irresistibly drawn to each other.

Faustus knows that taking her as his lover would corrupt her perfect purity, but his love for her is too strong, and they end up in each other's arms. Three months later she is pregnant, and he confesses that he cannot marry her, as he has taken the monastic vow. Horrified, she tells him to leave her and return to the Church. Gottfried returns from battle and proposes marriage to her but is rejected. When he realises why, he threatens to kill his betrayer, Faustus. Gretchen falls grievously ill because of her sin. Faustus, anguished with guilt at what he has done, reverts to the monk's habit and cries: "Send me my death, oh Heaven – send me my death!" Gottfried bursts in to kill Faustus, but they reconcile at Gretchen's deathbed. As she dies, Gretchen forgives Faustus, advising him to devote the rest of his life to "faith, and truth, and works of charity".

== Roles ==
- Dominic – J. A. Rosier
- Anselm – Mr. Vollaire
- Faustus – H. B. Conway
- Gottfried, a soldier – John Billington
- Mephisto – Frank Archer
- Agatha – Miss Thornton
- Bessie – Miss Lonsdale
- Barbara – Miss Folkard
- Lisa, Gretchen's friend – Mrs. Bernard Beere
- Gretchen – Marion Terry
- Martha – Maggie Brennan
- Frederic – Mr. Allbrook

== Analysis ==
Gretchen echoes several other Gilbert plays, particularly in the character of Faustus: The title character of Dan'l Druce, Blacksmith (1876) becomes a misanthropic miser, and Jeffrey Rollestone, the hero of The Ne'er-Do-Weel (1878), becomes a wandering tramp. Mousta in Broken Hearts (1875) is a hunchback rejected by a woman, and in The Yeomen of the Guard, Jack Point is destroyed by losing his love. A disappointment in love leads them to retreat from the world, to become misanthropes and outcasts. Faustus is a sympathetic, but deeply flawed character. Through him, Gilbert attempts to blur the moral absolutes of Victorian drama, just as he does in his comic plays.

Faustus has turned his back on the world which hurt him so deeply, but he is no happier in isolation in the monastery, as he cannot hew to the moral absolutes of the Church. He hopes to be purified by loving the pure Gretchen, but instead his influence corrupts and eventually kills her. He pleads for death, but Gretchen's dying words of advice are that he should not escape from guilt with "coward death", but instead atone through "faith, and truth, and works of charity". But Faustus has no correct course, unable to find peace by following the Church or living in the real world. There is no reason to believe that Faustus will be able to do hold to his promise of faith, truth and charity.

Gilbert scholar Andrew Crowther commented that Faustus is part of a recurring theme of "the unresolvable paradox of the outsider who seeks acceptance, the misanthrope who wants to be loved", and represents an aspect of Gilbert himself. Crowther wrote: "Faustus calls himself a cynic, as the critics often called Gilbert, but retains his belief in female purity – a sentimental aspect of Gilbert which is demonstrated clearly enough in [Broken Hearts and Gretchen]. Also, just as Gilbert satirised the Establishment of which he became at length a part, so Faustus scorns worldly things and at the same time desires them".

== See also ==
- List of W. S. Gilbert dramatic works
