= Edward Askew Sothern =

English actor (1826–1881)

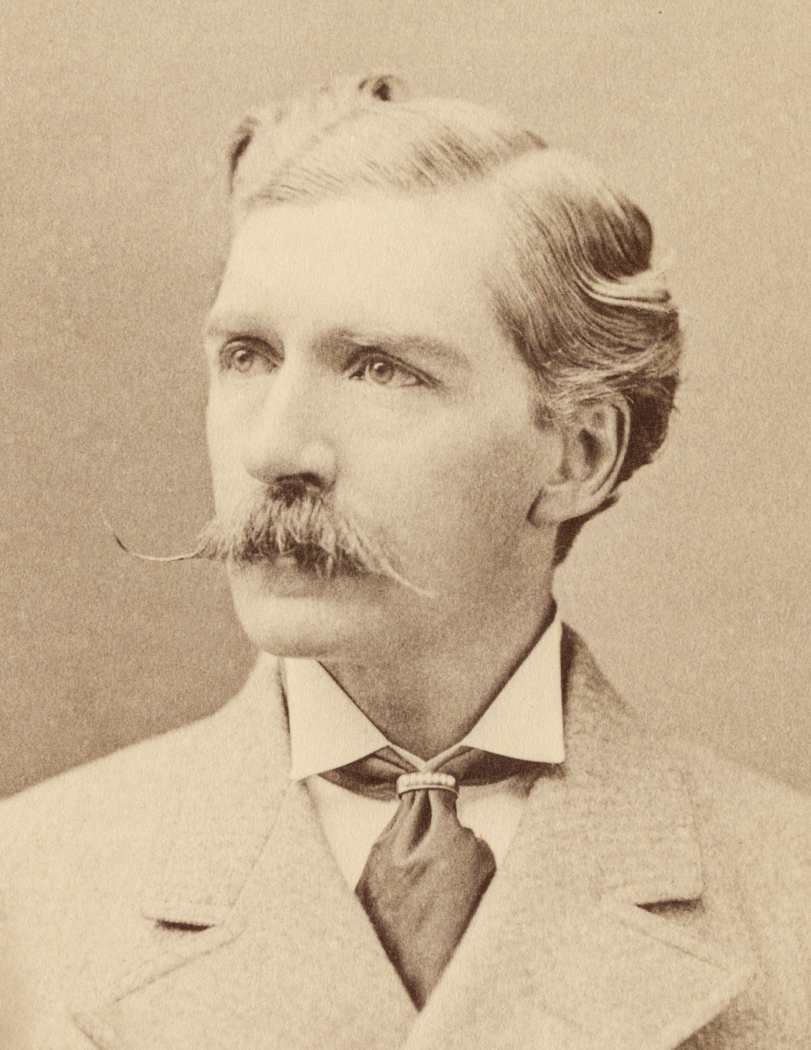
Cabinet card of E. A. Sothern, c. 1870s

Edward Askew Sothern (1 April 1826 – 20 January 1881) was an English actor known for his comic roles in Britain and America, particularly Lord Dundreary in Our American Cousin. He was also known for his many practical jokes.

== Life and career ==
=== Early years ===
Sothern was born in Liverpool, the son of a merchant. He began studying medicine, and his parents hoped that he would become a minister, but he decided against pursuing those professions. He worked as a clerk in the late 1840s and married Frances Emily "Fannie" Stewart (died 1882). He began acting as an amateur in 1848 under the stage name of Douglas Stewart. In 1849 he appeared in his first professional engagement at Saint Helier in Jersey, as Claude Melnotte in Bulwer Lytton's The Lady of Lyons. In the early 1850s, he played in various English companies without particular success in Portsmouth, Wolverhampton and Birmingham.

Sothern travelled to America in 1852, first playing Dr. Pangloss in The Heir at Law in Boston, Massachusetts, with John Lacy's company at the National Theatre. He then played at the Howard Athenaeum in Boston and at Barnum's American Museum in New York. In 1854, he joined the company at Wallack's Theatre. In the early part of his career, Sothern's wife often performed with him. By 1856, he had begun using his own name, Sothern, on stage. He had become associated with Laura Keene's company in New York by 1856. He finally gained attention at Wallack's Theatre in New York starring as Armand in Camille. The critic Clement Scott noted that while Sothern was "as handsome a man as ever stood on the stage", he was not naturally suited to romantic roles.

=== Our American Cousin ===
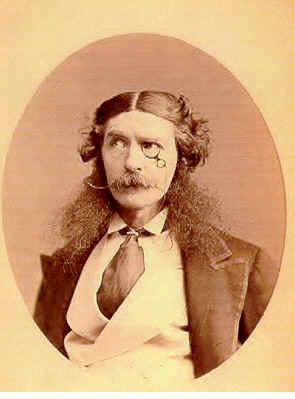
Sothern as Lord Dundreary

As a result of his success in Camille, Sothern was given a part in Tom Taylor's Our American Cousin at Laura Keene's Theatre. This piece would later become famous as the play that Abraham Lincoln was watching when he was assassinated. Sothern's role was Lord Dundreary, a caricature of a brainless English nobleman. At first, he was reluctant to accept the role; it was so small and unimportant that he felt it beneath him and feared it might damage his reputation.

On 15 October 1858, Our American Cousin premiered in New York. After a couple of unhappy weeks in the small role, Sothern began portraying the role as a lisping, skipping, eccentric, weak-minded fop prone to nonsensical references to sayings of his "bwother" Sam. His ad-libs were a sensation, earning good notices for his physical comedy and spawning much imitation and merry mockery on both sides of the Atlantic. His exaggerated, droopy side-whiskers became known as "Dundrearys". Sothern gradually expanded the role, adding gags and business until it became the central figure of the play. The most famous scene involved Dundreary reading a letter from his even sillier brother. The play ran for 150 nights, which was very successful for a New York run at the time. Sothern made his London debut in the role when the play ran for 496 performances at the Haymarket Theatre in 1861, earning rave reviews. The Athenaeum wrote, "it is certainly the funniest thing in the world... a vile caricature of a vain nobleman, intensely ignorant, and extremely indolent".

Dundreary became a popular recurring character, and Sothern successfully revived the play many times, making Dundreary by far his most famous role. A number of spin-off works were also created, including Charles Gayler's sequel, Our American Cousin at Home, or, Lord Dundreary Abroad (Buffalo, New York, 1860, and then New York City, 1861) and H. J. Byron's Dundreary Married and Done For. Sothern wrote his own play, Suspense, produced for Keene's 1860-61 season. He won wide popularity from his interpretation of Sam Slingsby in John Oxenford's Brother Sam (1862; revived in 1865), a play about Dundreary's brother.

=== 1860s and 1870s ===
In 1864, Sothern created the title role in Tom Robertson's David Garrick at the Haymarket Theatre. The play was a great success. The Times praised Sothern's acting in the Act II scene where Sothern depicted "the most extravagant form of drunkenness... perpetually brought into contact with the real agony of mind which is now on the point of casting aside the mask of debauchery". He also appeared in Robertson's Home and later claimed to have written some of the best scenes in each work (a claim that was disputed by Robertson). Other plays written for the now-famous Sothern were The Woman in Mauve, by Watts Phillips; The Favourite of Fortune and A Hero of Romance by Westland Marston; A Lesson for Life by Tom Taylor; and An English Gentleman by H. J. Byron (1871) at the Haymarket. Sothern continued to act mostly in London until 1876, but also toured extensively in the British provinces, North America and Europe.

Sothern became popular with Robertson's crowd, including with the Haymarket's manager, John Baldwin Buckstone, actor J. L. Toole, and dramatists Byron and W. S. Gilbert, who later wrote three plays for him, Dan'l Druce, Blacksmith (1876), The Ne'er-do-Weel (1878), and Foggerty's Fairy (1881). Sothern left England to tour in America in early 1876 and wrote to Gilbert to be ready with a play by October that would feature him in a serious role. This play eventually became Dan'l Druce. However, Sothern produced but did not star in the play. Gilbert soon wrote another play for Sothern, this time a comedy, The Ne'er-do-Weel. Sothern was not pleased with the work, and Gilbert offered to take it back. Although it was eventually produced, Sothern did not appear in it. Sothern had already paid Gilbert for the play, and Gilbert was unable immediately to pay him back. After various arrangements between Gilbert and Sothern involving American productions of another Gilbert play, Engaged (1877), Gilbert finally promised, in 1878, to write a new play for Sothern. This was to be Foggerty's Fairy.

Sothern never appeared in any of these works. His biographer T. Edgar Pemberton noted that one role he regretted not playing was Cheviot in Engaged. Instead, Sothern continued to tour and perform Dundreary and other works. In October 1877 at the Academy of Music in New York, he played the title role in Othello.

Sothern's next great role was the title role, Fitzaltamont, in a hit revival of Byron's The Crushed Tragedian (1878, originally named The Prompter's Box) at the Haymarket. The Era admired "the sepulchral tones, the glaring eyeballs, the long hair, the wonderful 'stage walk', the melodramatic attitudes" of his portrayal. He next appeared in The Hornet's Nest by Byron at the Haymarket. The Crushed Tragedian was not a great success in London, but it became a hit in New York. The Philadelphia Inquirer raved, "With what elaboration of detail does the actor embody his conception! There is not a gesture, not an intonation, not a movement, but seems to illustrate the character portrayed. He strides across the stage and it is as though he were wading through a sea of gore; he mutters to himself ‘Ha! ha!’ and you know that he is cursing fate with a bitterness loud and deep. always and in all things poor Altamont is exquisitely, indescribably ludicrous." In April 1879, he was still at the Haymarket, appearing in Bulwer-Lytton's play Money as Sir Frederick Blount.

=== Last years and family ===
In the autumn of 1879, after a long summer fishing trip, Sothern was on another American tour. The Era wrote in October 1879 that "It is proposed, during Mr Sothern's [American] engagement, to bring out revivals of The Crushed Tragedian, Dundreary, and David Garrick, the new comedy by Mr Gilbert being reserved for the spring engagement." On 29 February 1880 The Era reported: "Mr Sothern says that, although his new comedy, by Mr Gilbert, has cost him 3,000 guineas, he would not take 6,000 guineas for it now. It is a piece of the wildest absurdity ever perpetrated, and all the parts are immense." The same issue of The Era states that definite plans had been made for Sothern to appear at the Gaiety Theatre, London in Foggerty's Fairy, as the new play was now called, in October 1880, after the end of his American tour. Sothern had been ill for much of the time since the fall, although he fulfilled his performing commitments. He returned to England for a six-week holiday in June 1880, still planning to produce Fogerty's Fairy in New York. After one illness and a short European tour, Sothern fell seriously ill in the fall, and his health declined until he died in January 1881, never having performed Gilbert's play.

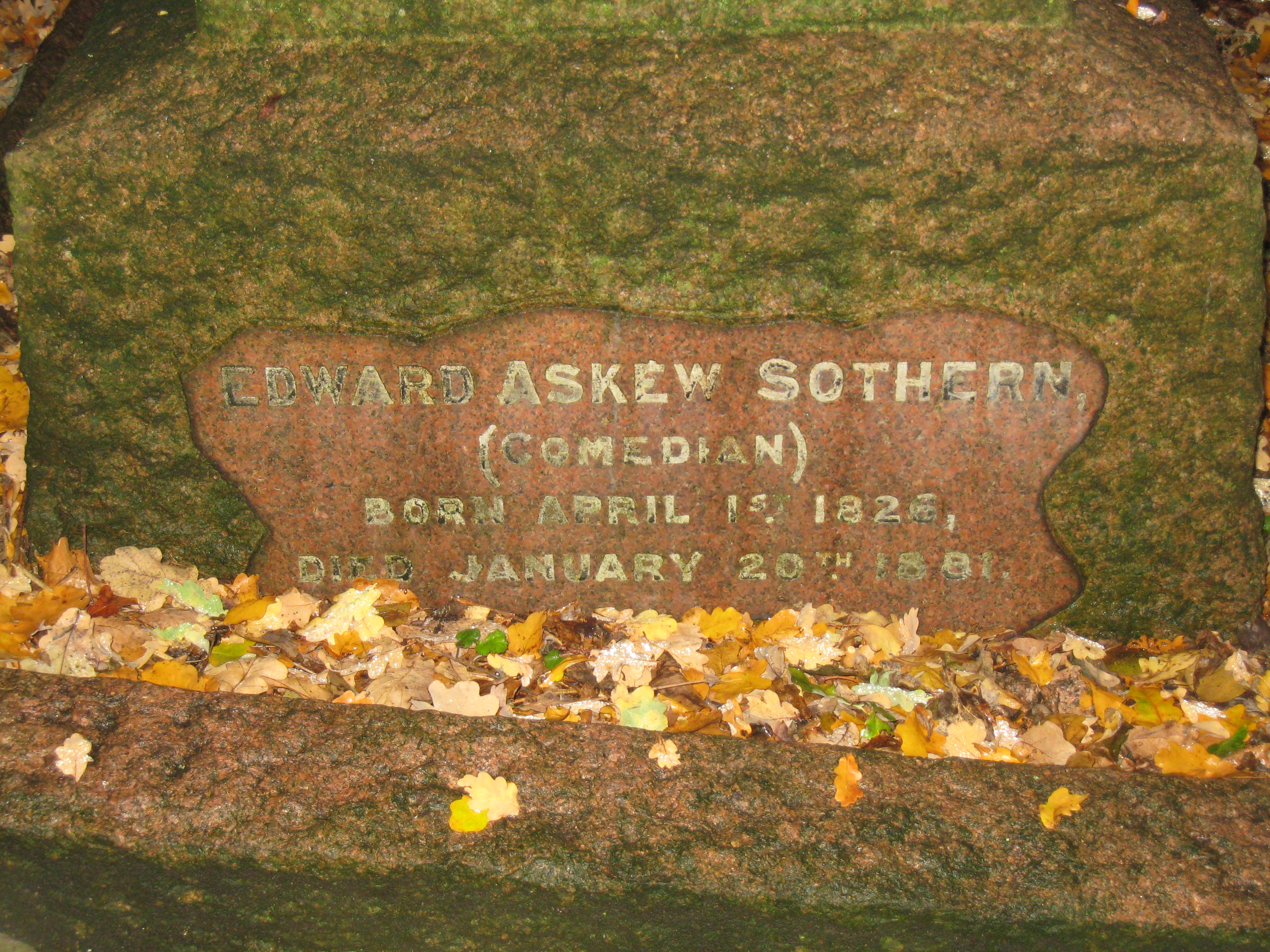
Sothern's grave in Southampton Old Cemetery

Sothern died at his home in Cavendish Square, London, at the age of 54 and is buried in Southampton Old Cemetery, Southampton. He was such a notorious practical joker that many of his friends missed his funeral, thinking it was a joke. His sister, Mary Cowan, was the principal beneficiary of his last will, signed shortly before his death. A previous will had given most of the estate to his widow and children. Sothern's widow contested the will but lost, and it took Cowan until 31 May 1881 to obtain probate. Gilbert suggested that she "underlet" Foggerty's Fairy to him, and he eventually had it produced.

Sothern and his wife had four children, all of whom became actors: Lytton Edward (1851–1887), Edward Hugh (E. H.), George Evelyn Augustus T. (born 1870; who used the stage name Sam Sothern) and Eva Mary. E. H. Sothern became prominent on the American stage. Sothern's house in Kensington, London was a resort for people of fashion, and he was as much a favourite in America as in the United Kingdom.

== Practical jokes ==
Sothern was known as a sportsman and bon vivant and became famous for his magic tricks, conversation and, especially, his practical jokes (he was born on April Fools' Day), his passion for which amounted almost to a mania. He would often falsely announce the death of a friend or send people on fool's errands. Sothern and his friends would demand that clerks sell them goods not carried by the store in question, stage mock arguments on public omnibuses, run fake advertisements in newspapers, pay street urchins to annoy passers-by and so forth. At one restaurant, Toole and Sothern removed the silver and hid under the table. When the unfortunate waiter found the dining room empty and the silver gone, he ran to report the theft. By the time he returned, Toole and Sothern had re-set the table as if nothing had happened.

Among his most elaborate practical jokes was the following. When the husband of actress Adelaide Neilson, Philip Henry Lee, visited New York in the mid-19th century, he had been warned about the wild, bohemian behaviour of American authors, but expressed his doubt as to the veracity of the stories. Sothern assured him it was true and arranged a private dinner for Lee with twelve "writers and critics", who were really actors. During the dinner, a quarrel arose over literary matters, culminating in a fight breaking out. The men, apparently drunk, brandished an axe, knives and revolvers. The room was filled with shouts, shots and struggle. Someone thrust a knife into Lee's hand, saying, "Defend yourself! This is butchery, sheer butchery!" Sothern advised him to "Keep cool, and don't get shot", before the joke was exposed.
