= Foggerty's Fairy =

Farce by W. S. Gilbert

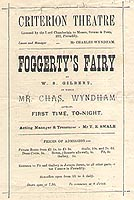
First night programme

Foggerty's Fairy, subtitled "An Entirely Original Fairy Farce", is a three-act farce by W. S. Gilbert based loosely on Gilbert's short story, "The Story of a Twelfth Cake", which was published in the Christmas Number of The Graphic in 1874, and elements of other Gilbert plays. The story concerns a man who, with the help of a fairy, changes a small event in his past to try to save his engagement to the girl he loves. This leads to profound changes in his present, and he finds that matters are even worse than before.

Foggerty's Fairy opened at the Criterion Theatre in London on 15 December 1881. Charles Wyndham, the manager of the Criterion, starred as the lead character, Frederick Foggerty. Despite Wyndham's star power, interest in the play's bold and original premise and reviews that were at least partly positive, the play was not a success. It closed on 6 January 1882 after about 25 performances. Disappointed, Gilbert turned back to writing comic operas with Arthur Sullivan.

== Background ==
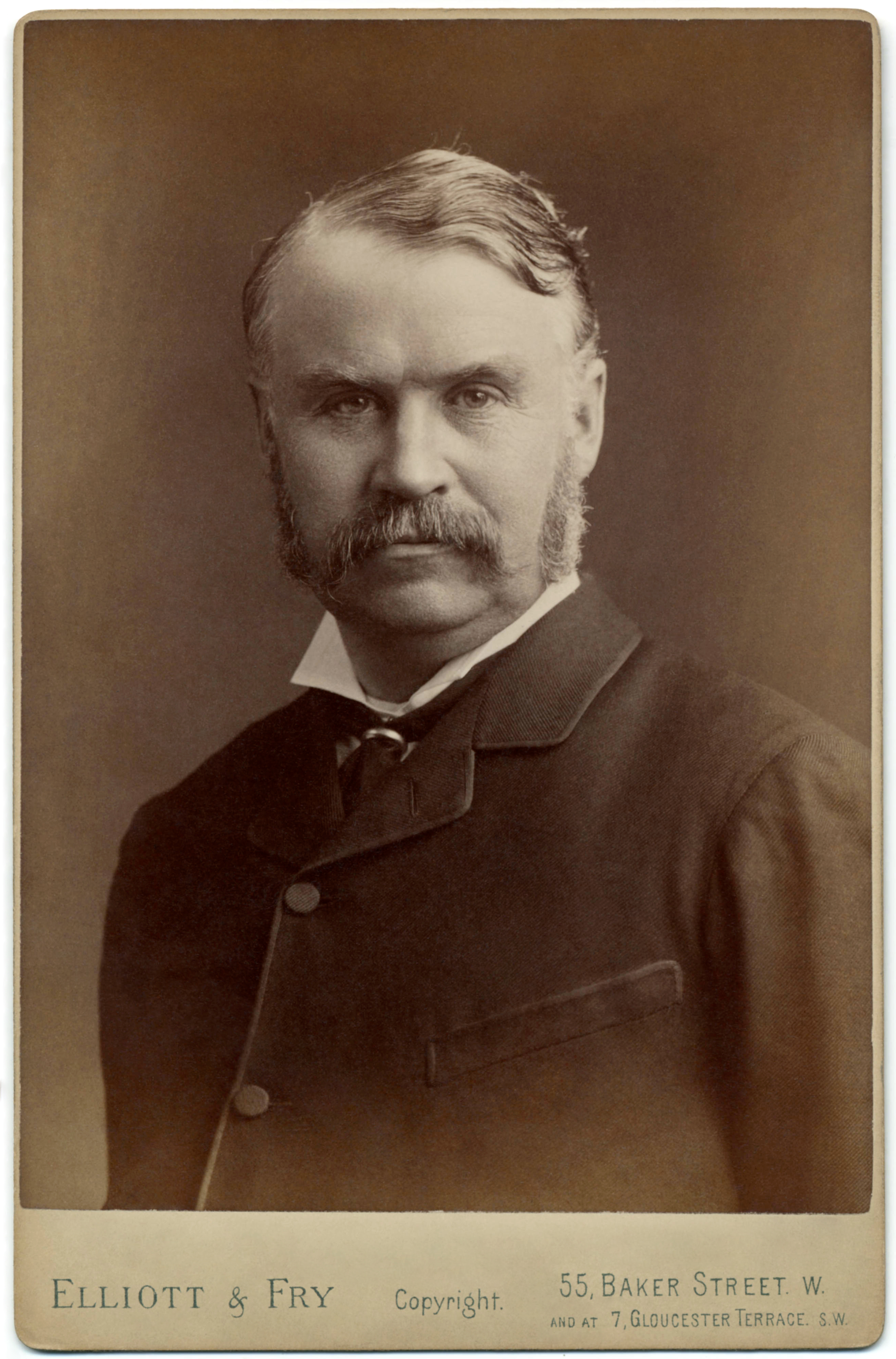
Cabinet card of W.S. Gilbert in about 1880 by Elliott & Fry

=== Genesis ===
By the time Foggerty's Fairy premiered, Gilbert and Sullivan had already written half a dozen comic opera hits. Since 1877, however, Gilbert had not written a successful play apart from Sullivan. Gilbert wrote Foggerty's Fairy for British actor Edward Sothern, who had commissioned two earlier plays from Gilbert, Dan'l Druce, Blacksmith and The Ne'er-do-weel. Sothern had not been satisfied with The Ne'er-do-weel, despite various rewrites, and he refused the piece. He had already paid Gilbert for the play, and Gilbert was unable immediately to pay him back. After various discussions between Gilbert and Sothern, Gilbert agreed to let Sothern play his recent comedy success, Engaged, in America and promised to write a new play for him.

In the autumn of 1879, Sothern was on one of his lengthy American tours. He intended to open the new Gilbert play at the Park Theatre in New York in the spring of 1880. The Era wrote in October 1979 that "It is proposed, during Mr Sothern's [American] engagement, to bring out revivals of The Crushed Tragedian, Dundreary, and David Garrick, the new comedy by Mr Gilbert being reserved for the spring engagement." At the same time, Gilbert was also busy rehearsing his American productions of H.M.S. Pinafore, the world premiere of The Pirates of Penzance and touring companies to play these and The Sorcerer, as well as British revivals of two of his plays.

On 29 February 1880 The Era reported: "Mr Sothern says that, although his new comedy, by Mr Gilbert, has cost him 3,000 guineas, he would not take 6,000 guineas for it now. It is a piece of the wildest absurdity ever perpetrated, and all the parts are immense." Obviously by that date Sothern had received an early version of the play and was enthusiastic about it. The same issue of The Era states that definite plans had been made for Sothern to appear at the Gaiety Theatre, London in Foggerty's Fairy, as the new play was now called, in October 1880, after the end of his American tour. Sothern did not produce the play in the spring, and scholar Andrew Crowther speculates that Gilbert was late in completing it. In addition, Sothern had been ill for much of the time since the autumn, although he fulfilled his performing commitments.

Sothern came to England for a six-week holiday in June 1880, still planning to produce Foggerty's Fairy in New York. After one illness and a short European tour, Sothern fell seriously ill in the autumn. His health declined until he died in January 1881 never having performed the play but leaving behind a heavily annotated copy. Sothern's sister, Mary Cowan, was the beneficiary of Sothern's will. Sothern's widow contested the will, and it took Cowan until 31 May to probate it. Gilbert contacted Cowan soon after Sothern's death and offered her his help. He suggested that she "underlet" Foggerty's Fairy to him for £525 and half of whatever he received for it until she had been paid 1,500 guineas. The play was first offered to comic actor J. L. Toole, but the deal fell through, and Gilbert next offered the play to actor Charles Wyndham, who was then manager of the Criterion Theatre. After Gilbert had settled these financial dealings with Mrs. Cowan, she wrote to him: "Allow me to say that of all the people with whom I have had any dealings in reference to money since my Brother's death, you have treated me with the greatest kindness & fairness & I feel grateful to you for sparing me any trouble or anxiety."

Foggerty's Fairy includes a mixture of several elements that Gilbert had used in earlier work. The main device of the fairy magic, which changes a small event from the past and leads to unexpected consequences, came from a short story, "The Story of a Twelfth Cake", which Gilbert had first published in the Christmas number of The Graphic in 1874. This novel plot elements anticipates numerous fantasy and science fiction stories like Back to the Future. Gilbert slightly modified the story and renamed it Foggerty's Fairy when he republished it in his 1890 collection of stories and essays, Foggerty's Fairy and Other Tales. Although this plot device is retained in the play, the plot of the play is almost completely changed. The device of transformation by supernatural aid is one of Gilbert's favourites. Gilbert uses it in The Sorcerer, The Mountebanks and many of his other works. In addition, Gilbert used elements from his earlier plays The Wedding March (1873) and Tom Cobb (1875). In addition, several lines from the play appear in various Gilbert and Sullivan operas. The Ko-Ko, Nanki-Poo and Yum-Yum exchange from The Mikado, about lovers being too affectionate in front of another man who loves the woman, is used in the first act of Foggerty's Fairy. The "romantic" old lady, Malvina de Vere, is described as "having the remains of a fine woman about her", as is Ruth in The Pirates of Penzance.

=== Productions ===
By October 1881, Gilbert was rehearsing Foggerty's Fairy at the Criterion. At the opening night on 15 December 1881, Arthur Sullivan was in the audience. He found the play "ingenious, but unsatisfactory—like a dream". Audience reaction was favourable enough that Gilbert took a curtain call. The critics agreed that the piece was bold and original but uneven. The idea of the parallel universes conjured by the fairy was novel and intriguing but bewildering to audiences and critics, who were required to remember the original state of affairs and compare them to the magically transformed one. We are used to this type of story in plays and films today, but it was unprecedented and shocking in 1881.

Wyndham's performance was praised, and the play must have generated considerable interest: On 24 December, the drama critic of The Illustrated London News had not yet seen the play, but had heard that the play was "brilliantly successful, and will probably have a very long run; so there will be plenty of time to criticise it at leisure after the feverish pantomimic Boxing-Night week. I hear the Fairy spoken of on all sides as one of the wittiest and as the most ingenious and daring of Mr Gilbert's dramatic productions." Unfortunately, he never published his review – Fogerty's Fairy closed on 6 January 1882, before the next edition of his weekly paper. It was not a success, playing only about 25 performances.

After the play's failure, Gilbert decided to concentrate on his work with Sullivan. Five days after it closed, Gilbert and Sullivan signed a new five-year agreement with Richard D'Oyly Carte to produce more operas together, and then they went to Sullivan's home to discuss their next piece, another work about fairies, Iolanthe. Foggerty's Fairy still receives occasional amateur productions and rare professional ones.

== Synopsis ==
=== Act I ===
In the Talbot drawing room, it is the morning of the marriage of Foggerty, a young pharmacist, to Jenny Talbot, a childhood friend. She will only marry a man who has never loved before because she doesn't want to "have a heart at second-hand". She was previously engaged to Foggerty's gloomy friend, Walkinshaw, but Foggerty informed her that Walkinshaw had been engaged to another woman, and so Jenny broke their engagement. Jenny's father, a "wholesale cheesemonger", and her guests do not much like Foggerty, and the best man, Walkinshaw, still bears a grudge. Foggerty has not told Jenny that he has another fiancée in Melbourne, Delia Spiff, a rich old woman who is a distant relative of Jenny's. Despite her wealth, however, he got cold feet and returned to London. Walkinshaw notes a newspaper report that Spiff has just arrived in England.

Foggerty is afraid that Spiff will ruin his marriage, but a fairy guardian named Rebecca arrives and offers help. Foggerty wishes that Spiff did not exist. She gives Foggerty a magic elixir that will change a past event in his life. Rebecca warns him that all the consequences of any event changed by the elixir will also be changed and that this may lead to unanticipated results. He promises to use caution. She also gives him pills that he can swallow before summoning her. Now Spiff arrives and claims Foggerty in marriage. Jenny calls off the engagement, Walkinshaw is pleased, and in desperation Foggerty drinks the elixir.

=== Act II ===
Fairy Rebecca awakens Foggerty, and he finds himself in a different drawing room. As a consequence of the obliteration of Spiff, Rebecca has never met Foggerty before. He overhears Jenny's bridesmaids talking and deduces that he is about to marry Jenny. Malvina de Vere, a "stately lady of middle age and tragical demeanour" meets Jenny, now in her wedding dress. Malvina has previously had 18 lovers, all of whom had left her, though not before paying substantial damages in breach of promise lawsuits. She believes that her 19th lover is unfaithful but hopes that lover 20 will marry her. Jenny invites her to her wedding reception.

It turns out that Jenny is about to marry Walkinshaw, rather than Foggerty, although she does not love him. Foggerty sees Jenny in her wedding dress and tries to kiss her, annoying Walkinshaw. After Foggerty understands the situation, he tells Jenny that he loves her. She says that she has always loved him, but he never declared his feelings, and now it is too late. He understands that, in his earlier reality, he had come together with Jenny only as a consequence of fleeing Spiff. Foggerty roughs up Walkinshaw for stealing his girl, but realises the cause and is dejected. Walkinshaw and Talbot doubt his sanity. Meanwhile, Jenny overhears Malvina calling her lawyer, who says that her 19th lover is to be married later that day, and so she is free to marry her number 20. She mentions her 19th lover's name: Walkinshaw! Jenny terminates her engagement to Walkinshaw, throwing herself into Foggerty's arms. Malvina sees Foggerty and tells him that she can marry him now – he is lover number 20. Jenny faints, and Foggerty flees with Malvina in pursuit.

=== Act III ===
Hours later, both return to Walkinshaw's parlour, exhausted. Jenny's father has called the doctors to report that Foggerty has gone mad. He instructs Walkinshaw to keep him there until he can be hauled off to the asylum, but Walkinshaw hides from Malvina. Threatened with a suit for staggering damages, and having lost Jenny, Foggerty decides to marry Malvina. He also explains to Malvina that he has lost his memory of the past. Talbot comes back with the doctors and Blogg, an asylum attendant. Blogg is instructed to stay and watch Foggerty but not to contradict him in any way. Foggerty deduces that Blogg is a policeman, and by the time he finishes asking Blogg about the crime that he himself must have committed, he thinks that he and Walkinshaw murdered the latter's aunt. Now he believes that he will be "hanged first and confined in a lunatic asylum afterwards".

He summons Rebecca using one of the pills, but she is not his fairy as a consequence of the elimination of Spiff. After some blackmailing (he has 47 pills left!), he points out some inconsistencies in the consequences of the magic. He persuades her to restore matters to their original state, but without Spiff. She does so, and the scene is transformed to daylight in the Talbot's home. All ends happily, with Foggerty to marry Jenny and Walkinshaw to marry Malvina.

== Critical reception ==
The drama critic of The New York Times wrote:

"Whether the piece was successful or not remains to be seen. Opinions differ. The audience was not enthusiastic. It laughed and it applauded. A portion of it hissed, but this portion was a miserable minority. The farce is in three acts. If it were in one it would be highly entertaining. In three it becomes tedious.... Unless set to music by Sullivan [Gilbert's] dramatic Bab Ballads are unbearable. You see all their ugly points, observe all their inhumanity.

The critic of the Illustrated Sporting and Dramatic News wrote:

"The first act... is occupied in a very fresh illustration of a familiar subject. For the hand of pretty Jennie Talbot, the sentimental daughter of a wholesale cheesemonger, there have been two rivals, Foggerty and Walkinshaw.... The... business-like air of the fairy, the incredulity of Foggerty, and the means by which a charm is made to work through a pill and a draught — all these combine to render this unique scene irresistibly ludicrous. It is, of course the very crux of the play, and if it were either misunderstood or resented the rest could not possibly succeed.

The spell itself and its consequences are certainly less easy to work out effectively than was the case with the famous spell in The Sorcerer.... After this the fun soon becomes fast and furious — too furious to be in our judgment characteristic of the author's happiest manner. There is certainly a good deal of drollery in Foggerty's interview with Malvina de Vere, and their friendly steps towards an action for breach of promise. But there is almost too much of it, and there is certainly too much of the satire upon mad-doctors and their ways which occurs when Foggerty's friends believe him demented, and try to get a certificate to that effect from Dr. Lobb and Dr. Dobb. The climax, therefore, which is brought about when the hero takes a pill, summons the fairy once more, and brings matters back to their status quo, is very welcome, for towards the last the fun is felt to be flagging. The mad dream has been almost too long as well as too elaborate in its absurdities. This fault, if it be found to exist, can, of course, be readily remedied, as there seems no real need for the hero's false confession, à la Topsy, of a crime which he never committed.

It would be difficult to say too much in praise of the spirit, the appreciation, and the judgment, with which Foggerty's Fairy is acted at the Criterion by all concerned.... But, above all, Mr. Wyndham's services in connection with the production are worthy of note. He has to keep Foggerty at fever pitch throughout, and yet never to abandon the tone of light comedy".

== Original cast ==
- Frederick Foggerty – Charles Wyndham
- Walkinshaw – George Giddens
- Talbot (a wholesale cheesemonger) – W. Blakeley
- Dr. Lobb and Dr. Dobb (mad doctors) – A. Maltby and H. H. Astley
- Blogg (a mad keeper) – A. Redwood
- Uncle Fogle – A. M. Denison
- Walker and Balker (wedding guests) – Edward H. Bell and Alexander Verton
- The Fairy Rebecca – Rosie Saker
- Jennie Talbot (Engaged in Act I to Foggerty and in Act II to Walkinshaw) – M. Rorke
- Miss Delia Spiff (a matter-of-fact old lady) – M. Daly
- Tottie and Lottie (Jennie's bridesmaids) – F. Harrington and K. Rorke
- Aunt Bogle – Mrs A. Mellon
- Miss De Vere (a romantic lady) – Mrs. John Wood
