= The Ne'er-do-Weel =

Play by W. S. Gilbert

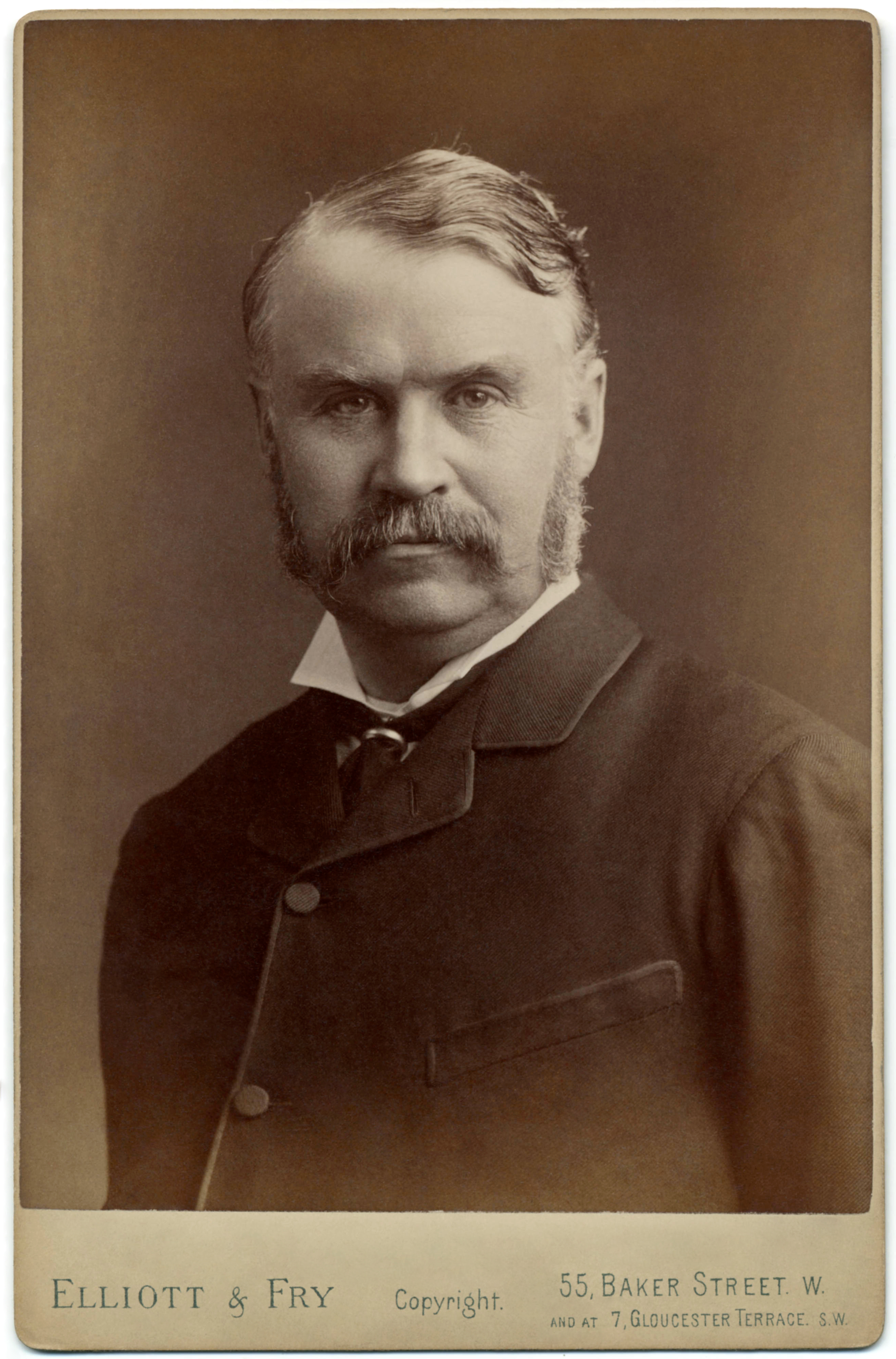
Cabinet card of W.S. Gilbert in about 1880 by Elliott & Fry

The Ne'er-do-Weel is a three-act drama written by the English dramatist W. S. Gilbert. It is the second of three plays that he wrote at the request of the actor Edward Sothern. The story concerns Jeffery Rollestone, a gentleman who becomes a vagabond after Maud, the girl he loves, leaves him. He meets Gerard, an old school chum who arranges for him to have a good post. Jeffery returns the favour by sacrificing to try to help Gerard marry Maud (Gerard needs the marriage for financial reasons), even though Jeffery and Maud still love each other.

The play opened at London's Olympic Theatre on 25 February 1878. The play was poorly received, and Gilbert withdrew it after six performances. Critics felt that the play inappropriately combined sentimental scenes with comedy. Gilbert rewrote and restaged the piece three weeks later and renamed it The Vagabond. Although these changes brought a better reception, the play was not a success and closed within a month. Soon afterwards, however, Gilbert and Sullivan's H.M.S. Pinafore opened, followed by a decade of extraordinarily successful Savoy operas.

== Background ==
By the time he wrote The Ne'er-do-Weel, W. S. Gilbert had produced 50 previous works for the theatre and was one of England's leading playwrights. Successes the previous year had included a comedy, Engaged, and a comic opera with composer Arthur Sullivan, The Sorcerer.

Comic actor Edward Sothern had asked Gilbert, in 1875, to write a play for him. Gilbert was unable to complete that play on time, but Sothern asked Gilbert to be ready with a play by October 1876 that would feature him in a serious role with comic scenes. Gilbert wrote the play, Dan'l Druce, Blacksmith, but when the play opened at the Haymarket Theatre in September 1876, Hermann Vezin took the title role instead of Sothern, in a cast featuring the young actor Johnston Forbes-Robertson and the 19-year-old Marion Terry, sister of the famous actress Ellen Terry.

=== Genesis ===
Meanwhile, Gilbert had already been working on another play for Sothern, The Ne'er-do-Weel, presumably to be produced at the Haymarket. Gilbert wanted to use a pseudonym because he would not personally direct the play, but Sothern thought that the piece would do better with Gilbert's name attached. Sothern corresponded frequently with Gilbert and had many requirements and suggestions for the piece in terms of length, setting and number of characters, among other things, that "the seriousness should be brightened up with comedy" and that an important part of the plot should be a "story of a man making some great sacrifice for the girl he madly loves". Sothern's conflicting requests for dramatic and comic situations made it difficult for Gilbert to write an internally consistent play.

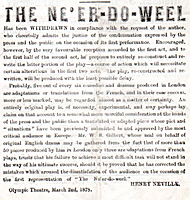
Henry Neville's programme note withdrawing The Ne'er-do-Weel at Gilbert's request

In July 1876, Gilbert sent an outline of the plot to Sothern. Gilbert noted that it would be difficult to put much comedy into the play. In August, Sothern replied, partly approving the plot sketch, but worrying about how the love story would play out. Sothern also became concerned that, because Gilbert had made the play's heroine a widow rather than a virgin, audiences would not be sympathetic to her. Sothern requested that the husband die of a heart attack immediately after their wedding, so that she might remain in a state of innocence. Gilbert resisted this suggestion, and when he sent a draft of the script in January 1877, Sothern was not pleased with the work and offered to forfeit his rights in it, letting Gilbert keep 500 pounds as the forfeiture fee. He had already paid Gilbert 2,000 guineas for the play, and Gilbert was unable immediately to pay him back, having just purchased a new house. After further discussions, in March 1877 Sothern asked Gilbert to revise the piece, renewing his request that the widow be a maiden.

Despite various rewrites, Sothern continued to be dissatisfied with the piece, and in July 1877, he asked Gilbert to take it back, now offering him a forfeiture fee of 1,000 guineas. Gilbert felt bad about holding Sothern to this bargain, and in August 1877, he suggested that he have someone else produce the play and pay Sothern back from any profits up to the full 2,000 guineas. Sothern agreed. Gilbert arranged for Henry Neville, lessee of London's Olympic Theatre, to produce The Ne'er-do-Weel, and rehearsals began in January 1878. Neville played the role written for Sothern, and the cast again featured Johnston Forbes-Robertson as well as Gilbert's protege, Marion Terry.

Programme for The Vagabond for 30 March 1878

The Ne'er-do-Weel opened at the Olympic Theatre on 25 February 1878. It was poorly received, and the critics found fault with Gilbert's combination of melodrama and comedy in the same play. For example, The Times review lamented that Gilbert introduced into passages of "real human passion and ... real human feeling, some grotesque turn of thought, or extravagance of whim painfully at variance with the spirit of the scene, and which ... is unable to provoke laughter for its own sake". For example, in one scene Richard Quilt, the villain of the piece, is tied hand and foot by the hero, whom he threatens. Then he hops off the stage, still bound. Gilbert withdrew the play after only six performances, and Neville printed a note (pictured above) in the programme of the next production at the Olympic acknowledging the poor reception of the second half of the piece, promising to offer a rewritten piece "with the least delay possible" and begging the excuse that writing "an entirely original play" in English was a difficult task.

=== The Vagabond and aftermath ===
After some delay due to an attack of the gout and Gilbert's busy schedule, he rewrote the piece (particularly the third act), mostly to remove some of the comic episodes and to take out the character of Richard Quilt. It reopened at the Olympic as The Vagabond on 25 March 1878 and received a kinder reception by both audiences and critics. One critic wrote that, although the piece was now more successful, it was hardly worthwhile to revise the piece: "It can never hope ... to occupy a place with its author's best work having neither the strength nor the shapeliness of the plays by which Mr Gilbert is known and judged." Other reviews criticised Gilbert for his "failure... to acknowledge the public verdict". The play ran for about 23 performances, until 18 April 1878. Although the piece was disappointing, Gilbert was soon to score the biggest triumph of his career, with H.M.S. Pinafore, which opened exactly three months after The Ne'er-do-Weel.

After the play failed, there were no profits with which Gilbert could pay Sothern back at least the 1,000 guineas above the forfeiture fee. He offered to pay it back in instalments over three years, and Sothern graciously accepted. Gilbert also licensed Sothern to mount American productions of Gilbert's 1877 comic success, Engaged, and he also eventually wrote a new play for Sothern, Foggerty's Fairy. The next year, in 1879, Neville produced another Gilbert drama at the Olympic, Gretchen, but that, too, was a failure. Afterwards, Gilbert concentrated on the highly profitable Savoy operas, writing only a few more plays during the rest of his life.

== Characters and original cast ==
- Jeffery Rollestone, a vagabond – Henry Neville
- Mr. Seton, of Drumferry – Mr. Flockton
- Gerard Seton, Lieutenant, R.N, his son – Johnston Forbes-Robertson
- Maud Callendar, Gerard Seton's wealthy cousin – Marion Terry
- Richard Quilt, Mr. Seton's ex-secretary – Robert Pateman
- Captain O'Hara, a retired merchant-sailor – George W. Anson
- Jessie O'Hara, his niece – Miss Gerard
- Miss Parminter, a distant connection of Mr. Seton's – Maggie Brennan
- Jakes, Mr. Seton's Butler – Mr. Bauer

== Synopsis ==
Note: This is a summary of the plot of The Ne'er-do-Weel. Substantial changes were made before the play was revived as The Vagabond.

Act I

Richard Quilt is romantically interested in Jessie O'Hara. But Jessie, in turn, is in love with Gerard Seton and rejects Richard's advances. Richard has recently been discharged as secretary to Gerard's father because of dishonesty in his accounts. Gerard is fond of Jessie, but his family situation requires that he must marry a wealthy woman, and so he plans to marry his cousin, a wealthy young widow, Maud Callendar. Maud is staying with the Seton family in their ancestral home, Drumferry.

Gerard tries to hire a passing vagabond to pose as a model for a sketch he is working on. The vagabond, Jeffery Rollestone, turns out to be Gerard's old school chum. The well-born and talented Jeffery sank into a life of "poverty and wretchedness" after the girl he loved deserted him, at her family's request, to marry another man. Gerard offers Jeffery a post as his father's secretary, since that position is now available, and Jeffery repents of his misdeeds. Gerard approaches Maud to propose, but she regards him as a brother. Maud is the woman who had broken Jeffery's heart, and the two suppress their emotions.

Act II

Six weeks later, Jeffery is enjoying working for pleasant Mr. Seton. The Setons are deep in debt, however, and without an advantageous marriage for Gerard, they will lose Drumferry. Mr. Seton asks Jeffery to try to help Gerard persuade Maud to marry him. Jeffery, though in love with Maud, approaches her to speak for Gerard. Maud is hurt that he, who once loved her, could urge her to marry another man. She declares that she still loves him, and he returns the declaration; they renew their engagement. When Mr. Seton finds out what has happened, he furiously fires Jeffery.

Before Jeffery can leave, Richard Quilt sneaks into the Seton home to steal some love letters from Jessie to Gerard, planning blackmail. Jeffery takes the letters from him, except for one, which Richard manages to hide. He ties Richard up and questions him, but lets him go (hopping away still bound), planning to give the letters to Gerard. Richard, however, is stopped by a porter, and the hidden letter from Jessie, addressed to "My dear, dear friend", is found. Jessie's uncle, Captain O'Hara, assumes that Jessie wrote the letter to Gerard. Maud has returned and says that, if Jessie wrote the letter to Gerard, she will never speak to Gerard again. To Maud's horror, however, Jeffery, who wants to help Gerard because of his kindnesses to him) declares that the letter is meant for him. Mr. Seton is grateful.

Act III

The bumbling Captain O'Hara, who has recently become a magistrate, must question Richard about the accusation of burglary. His prisoner must assist O'Hara in following the applicable legal terms and procedures, which is helpful to Richard in his defence. O'Hara attacks Jeffery for supposedly romancing his niece. Jeffery takes all the blame and says that the niece is faultless. He agrees to marry Jessie, although he does not know her name.

Maud wants to forgive Jeffery, but he says nothing in his own defence. Jessie has travelled to London with Gerard, but now Gerard returns and is angry with Jeffery for having proposed to Maud. But Jeffery explains that he only claimed to be the addressee of Jessie's letter to help Gerard marry Maud. Unfortunately, Gerard has now married Jessie. Fortunately, however, Mr. Seton's wealthy cousin has just died suddenly, and he now has financial security. Jeffery and Gerard reconcile, and Jessie reconciles with her uncle. Maud returns, having found out what is going on, and she and Jeffery happily pair off.

== See also ==
- List of W. S. Gilbert dramatic works
