= Comedy and Tragedy =

Mary Anderson as Clarice, 1884

Comedy and Tragedy is a one-act play by W. S. Gilbert, first presented at the Lyceum Theatre, London on 26 January 1884. Based on an earlier short story of the same title by Gilbert it was a vehicle for the actress Mary Anderson, calling on her to demonstrate a wide variety of theatrical skills ranging from seductive and conspiratorial to comic and then tragic. It was revived several times over the next three decades.

The play depicts the actress Clarice, leading lady of the Comédie-Française, pursued in her Paris house by the lecherous Regent of France who is trapped into fighting – and dying in – a duel with Clarice's husband in the garden, while to distract her other guests from what is happening outside she improvises a virtuoso series of dramatic vignettes for their entertainment.

== Background and premiere ==
By 1884 W. S. Gilbert was an established and successful dramatist. He was known for his libretti for the comic operas he had written, and continued to write, with Arthur Sullivan, which by then included Trial by Jury, H.M.S. Pinafore, The Pirates of Penzance, Patience and Iolanthe, and several of his non-musical plays had been successful, including The Princess, Pygmalion and Galatea, The Wedding March, Dan'l Druce, Blacksmith, and his most enduring non-musical play, the farcical comedy Engaged.

For a revival of Pygmalion and Galatea at the Lyceum Theatre, London in December 1883, Gilbert wrote Comedy and Tragedy as a short after-piece, which was added to the bill on 26 January 1884. The title roles in Pygmalion and Galatea were played by J. H. Barnes and Mary Anderson, an American actress making her London début. They played two of the three leading roles in the new play.

Gilbert based the play on a short story of his, by the same title, published in The Stage Door magazine at Christmas 1879. He said the piece had been written with the express intention of dramatisation. The story has the same plot as the play, but the characters' names are different. The Céline of the short story becomes Clarice, De Quillac becomes D'Aulnay and the villain of the piece is the Duc de Richelieu in the story, which is set in 1745, but is the Duc d'Orléans in the play, which is set during the French Regency of 1715–1723.

The plot takes liberties with the historical facts: although both Richelieu and Orléans were – as Gilbert correctly depicts them – notorious womanisers, neither was killed in a duel by a wronged husband. They died of natural causes – Richelieu (at the age of 92) at his mansion in Paris, and Orléans in his rooms at the Château of Versailles. The short story is nearer than the play to some historical facts: Richelieu carried off the actress La Souris in 1719, and was a noted swordsman and duellist.

== Original cast ==
- Duc d'Orléans – J. H. Barnes
- D'Aulnay – George Alexander
- Doctor Choquart – E. F. Edgar
- Abbé Dubois – E. T. Mallen
- De Grancy – Frank Griffin
- De la Ferté – Arthur Lewis
- De Courcelles – Francis Raphael
- Viscomte de Mauzun – Newton Chisnell
- De Broglio – Gillespie Lewis
- Joseph – Walter Russell
- Pauline – Miss O'Reilly
- Clarice – Mary Anderson

Source: The Era.

== Plot ==
The play is set in the time of the French Regency in the luxurious Paris house of Clarice, the leading lady of the Comédie-Française. To the astonishment of her sister, she is about to entertain a party of the most dissolute men in Paris, including the Duc d'Orléans, Regent of France, who has repeatedly attempted to seduce her and has at least once attempted to carry her off by force. Clarice is devotedly married to a young man named D'Aulnay, who is of good family, and formerly a member of the King's bodyguard. He has left the military and become an actor to be near to, and protect, his young wife.

Left alone with Orléans, Clarice pretends to lead him on but he is interrupted by the sudden appearance of D'Aulnay, who challenges him to a duel. Orléans replies that he cannot fight a duel with a mere actor, at which D'Aulnay produces his contract with the theatre company, tears it up and vows never to return to the stage. They go off to fight a duel in the garden.

When the other guests – Orléans' cronies – come in, Clarice distracts their attention from what is going on outside by exercising her powers of improvisation to amuse them. She shows her skill as an actress of comedy, depicting a strolling player calling at an inn and the various characters he is called upon to assume – king, beggar, miser, ghost. Suddenly comedy turns to tragedy. She hears a cry from the garden, and fears for her husband's life. But D'Aulnay is unscathed and has mortally wounded Orléans.

== Reception ==
The theatrical newspaper The Era said that Gilbert "has given us a play that should certainly enhance his well-won fame ... a masterly little stage work happily conceived, vigorously written, and replete with dramatic effect". The Era considered the play "Miss Mary Anderson's crowning triumph":

She was called upon to play upon a whole gamut of human emotions – to be deceitful, alluring, lying, loving, revengeful, cheerful, sorrowful, buoyant, apprehensive, to pass in an instant "from gay to grave, from lively to severe", and to follow swift upon the heels of comedy mirth with the terror of tragedy.

Vanity Fair commented, "This exquisite little sketch from the pen of Mr W. S. Gilbert is one of the best dramatic vignettes ever written since De Musset made Proverbes":

It is a little whirlwind while it lasts, a storm that sweeps across a woman’s life, a moment of sustained and vivid intensity, and there isn't a weak spot or unnecessary word in it from end to end. It is the work of a skilled craftsman working at his best, and it may be said at once that it is the best thing Miss Anderson has yet done.

== Revivals ==
In revivals of the piece the lead roles, Clarice, D'Aulnay and the Duc d'Orléans, have been played respectively by:

- Mary Anderson, William Terriss and William Rignold (Lyceum, 1884)
- Julia Neilson, Fred Terry and Lewis Waller (Haymarket Theatre, 1890)
- Janette Steer, Franklin Dyall and Fuller Mellish (Comedy Theatre, 1900)
- Ethel Irving, Leslie Faber and George W. Cockburn (Criterion Theatre, 1905)
- Mary Anderson, Ben Webster and Norman V. Norman (His Majesty's Theatre, 1916).

== Sources ==
- Haining, Peter, ed. (1982). The Lost Stories of W.S. Gilbert. London: Robson Books. ISBN 0860512002.
- Lewis, W. H (1961). The Scandalous Regent: A Life of Philippe, Duc d'Orleans, 1674–1723. London: André Deutsch. OCLC 1151171970.
- Rollins, Cyril; R. John Witts (1962). The D'Oyly Carte Opera Company in Gilbert and Sullivan Operas: A Record of Productions, 1875–1961. London: Michael Joseph. OCLC 504581419.
- Stedman, Jane W. (1996). W. S. Gilbert, A Classic Victorian & His Theatre. Oxford University Press. ISBN 978-0-19-816174-5.
- Williams, H. Noël (1910). The Fascinating Duc de Richelieu, Louis François Armand du Plessis (1696–1788). London: Methuen. OCLC 1045109666.
