= Cabinet card =

Style of photograph

The cabinet card was a style of photograph that was widely used for photographic portraiture after 1870. It consisted of a thin photograph mounted on a card typically measuring 108 by 165 mm (4 1/4 by 6 1/2 inches).

== History ==
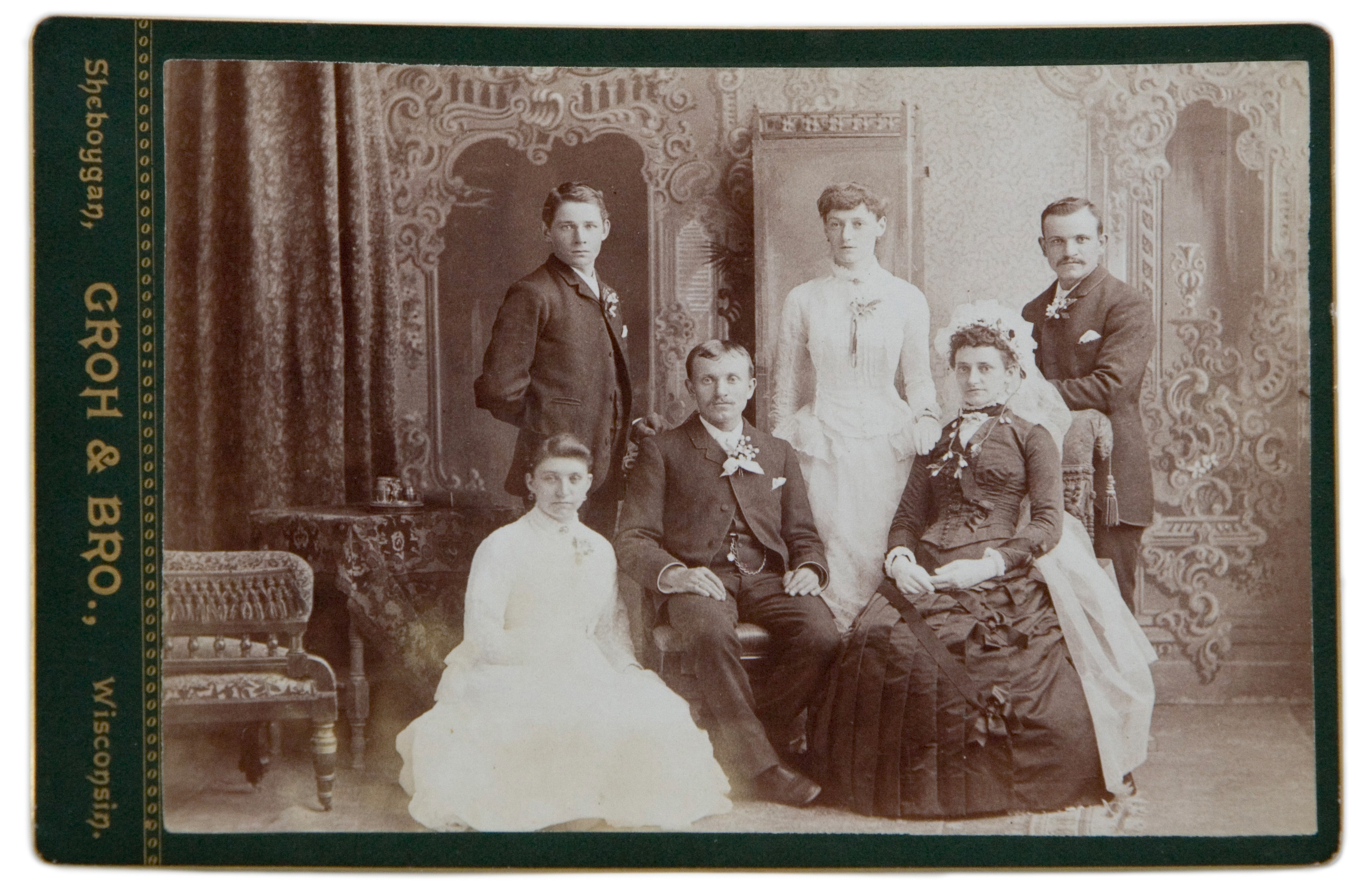
A photograph by G.M. Gros & Bro. of a wedding party probably from the late 1870s to 1880s. (Note the dark-colored wedding dress, which was common during the early to mid-19th century.)

The carte de visite was displaced by the larger cabinet card in the second half of the 1860s. Both were most often albumen prints, the primary difference being the cabinet card was larger and usually included extensive logos and information on the reverse side of the card to advertise the photographer's services. However, later into its popularity, other types of papers began to replace the albumen process. Despite the similarity, the cabinet card format was initially used for landscape views before it was adopted for portraiture.

Some cabinet card images from the 1890s have the appearance of a black-and-white photograph in contrast to the distinctive sepia toning notable in the albumen print process. These photographs have a neutral image tone and were most likely produced on a matte collodion, gelatin or gelatin bromide paper.

Sometimes images from this period can be identified by a greenish cast. Gelatin papers were introduced in the 1870s and started gaining acceptance in the 1880s and 1890s as the gelatin bromide papers became popular. Matte collodion was used in the same period. A true black-and-white image on a cabinet card is likely to have been produced in the 1890s or after 1900. The last cabinet cards were produced in the 1920s, even as late as 1924.

Owing to the larger image size, the cabinet card steadily increased in popularity during the second half of the 1860s and into the 1870s, replacing the carte de visite as the most popular form of portraiture. The cabinet card was large enough to be easily viewed from across the room when typically displayed on a cabinet, which is probably why they became known as such in the vernacular. However, when the renowned American Civil War photographer Mathew Brady first started offering them to his clientele towards the end of 1865, he used the trademark "Imperial Carte-de-Visite". Whatever the name, the popular print format joined the photograph album as a fixture in the late 19th-century Victorian parlor.

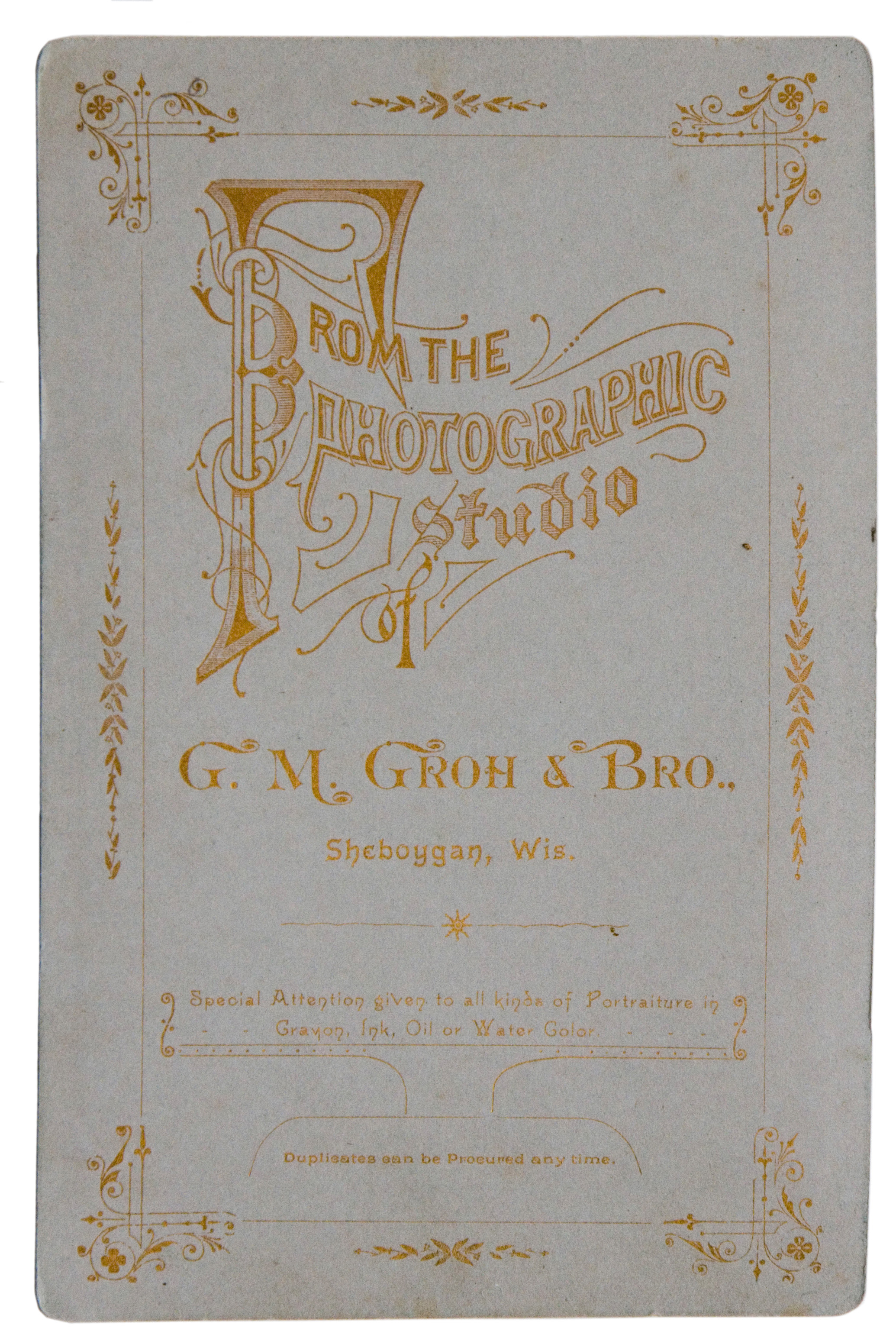
The reverse side of the card as seen above

Early in its introduction, the cabinet card ushered in the temporary disuse of the photographic album which had come into existence commercially with the carte de visite. Photographers began employing artists to retouch photographs by altering the negative before making the print to hide facial defects revealed by the new format. Small stands and photograph frames for the tabletop replaced the heavy photograph album. Photo album manufacturers responded by producing albums with pages primarily for cabinet cards with a few pages in the back reserved for the old family carte de visite prints.

For nearly three decades after the 1860s, the commercial portraiture industry was dominated by the carte de visite and cabinet card formats. In the decade before 1900, the number and variety of card photograph styles expanded in response to declining sales. Manufacturers of standardized card stock and print materials hoped to stimulate sales and retain public interest in card photographs. However, the public increasingly demanded outdoor and candid photographs with enlarged prints which they could frame or smaller unmounted snapshots they could collect in scrapbooks.

=== Photographers ===
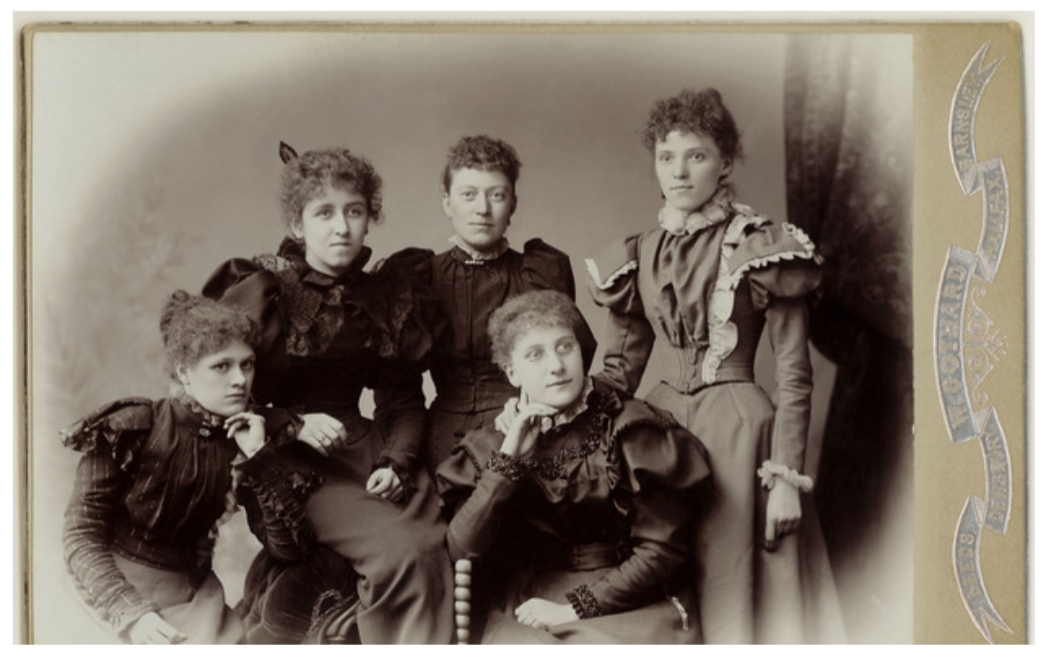
Cabinet card by photographer Warner Gothard, c. 1897

Well-known cabinet card photographers include G.M. Gros & Bro. of Wisconsin and Warner Gothard (1865–1940) who photographed the British royal family when they were in Leeds in 1894. Gothard had studios in Leeds as well as Dewsbury, Halifax and Barnsley.

Owing in part to the immense popularity of the affordable Kodak Box Brownie camera, first introduced in 1900, the public increasingly began taking their own photographs, and thus the popularity of the cabinet card declined.

== Timeline ==
- Introduced: 1860. First used for horizontal views, then eventually adapted for portraits.
- Peak popularity: 1880s. Although not uncommon in the 1870s, the cabinet card became more widely used in the 1880s but never displaced the carte de visite.
- Decline: 1890s. As snapshot and personal photography became commonplace among the public, the popularity of the cabinet card and cabinet card specific albums waned. Unmounted paper prints and the scrapbook albums started replacing them. A variety of other large card styles of various names and dimensions came about for professional portraits in the 1880s and 1890s. After 1900, card photographs generally had a much larger area surrounding the print quite often with an embossed frame around the image on heavy, gray card stock.
- Last used: The cabinet card still had a place in public consumption and continued to be produced until the early 1900s and quite a bit longer in Europe. The last cabinet cards were produced in the 1930s.

== Dating a cabinet card ==
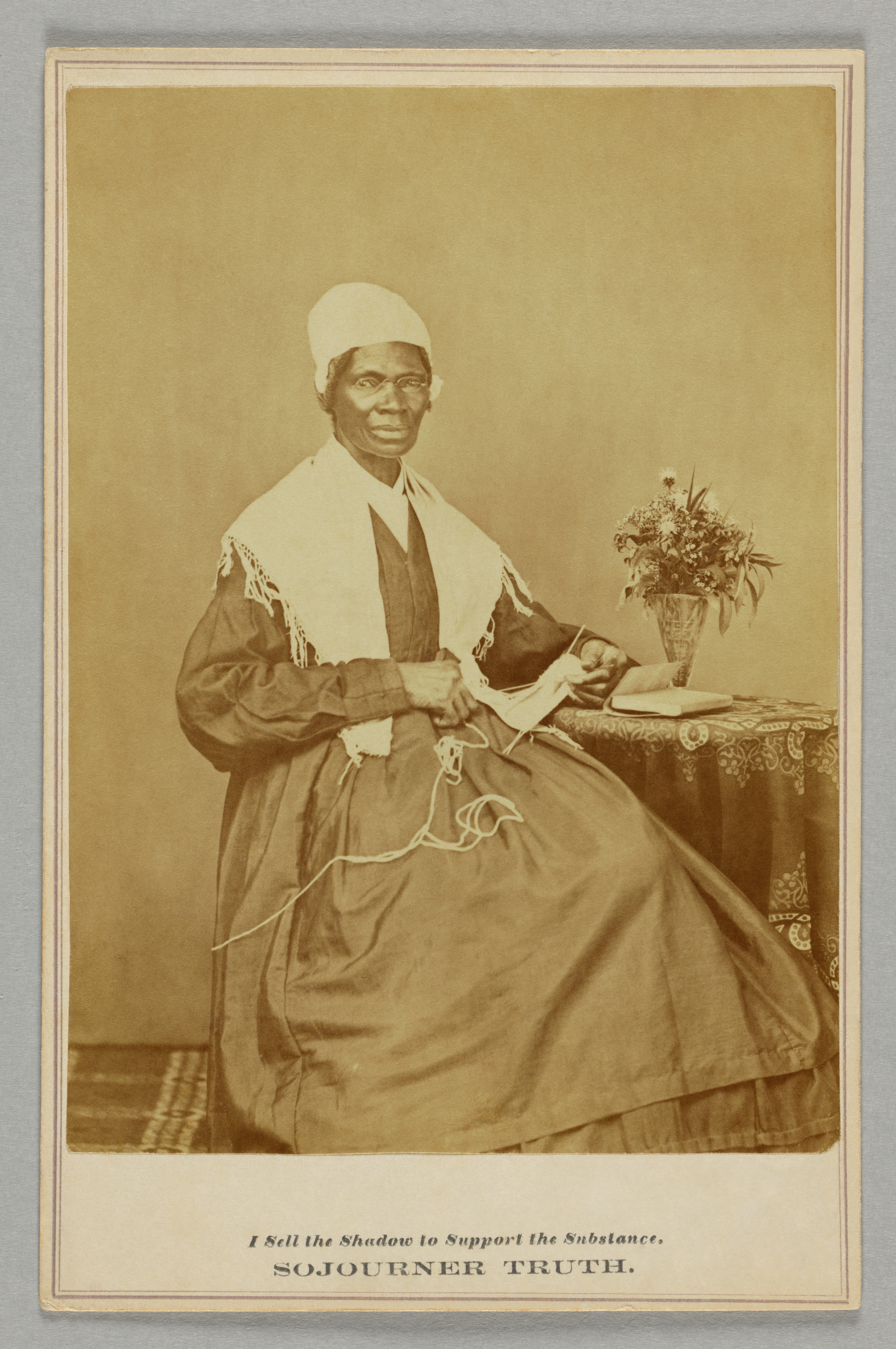
Sojourner Truth sold cabinet cards such as this one, sold in 1870, to support her work.

When attempting to determine the date of creation for a cabinet card, clues can be gathered by the details on the card. The type of card stock or whether it had right-angled or rounded corners can often help to determine the date of the photograph to as close as five years. However, these dating methods are not always 100% accurate, since a Victorian photographer may have been using up old card stock, or the cabinet card may have been a re-print made many years after the photo was originally recorded.

Card stock

- 1866–1880: square, lightweight mount
- 1880–1890: square, heavy weight card stock
- 1890s: scalloped edges

Card colours

- 1866–1880: thin, light weight card stock in white, off white or light cream; white and light colours were used in later years, but generally on heavier card stock
- 1880–1890: different colours for face and back of mounts
- 1882–1888: matte-finish front, with a creamy-yellow, glossy back

Borders

- 1866–1880: red or gold rules, single and double lines
- 1884–1885: wide gold borders
- 1885–1892: gold beveled edges
- 1889–1896: rounded corner rule of single line
- 1890s on: Embossed borders and/or lettering

Lettering

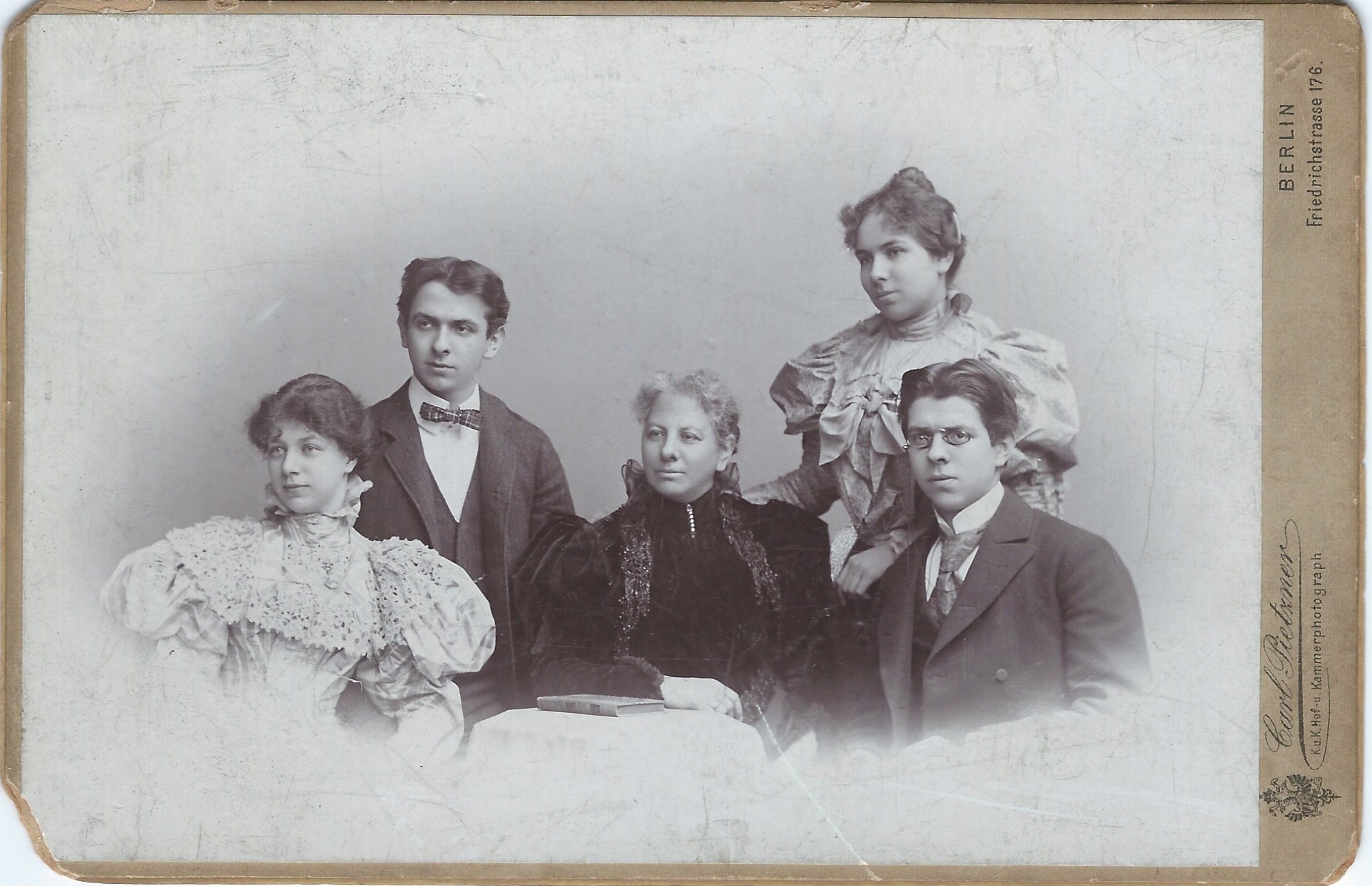
A cabinet card from 1896

- 1866–1879 Photographer name and address often printed small and neatly just below the image, and/or studio name printed small on back.
- 1880s on: Large, ornate text for photographer name and address, especially in cursive style. Studio name often takes up the entire back of the card.
- Late 1880s–1890s Gold text on black card stock
- 1890s on: embossed studio name or other embossed designs

== Card sizes ==
- Carte de visite (2.5 by 4.5 inches (64 by 114 mm)), the same size as calling cards
- Cabinet card: (4.5 by 6.5 inches (110 by 170 mm))
- Boudoir card: (5.25 by 8.5 inches (133 by 216 mm))
