= Dan'l Druce, Blacksmith =

Play by W. S. Gilbert

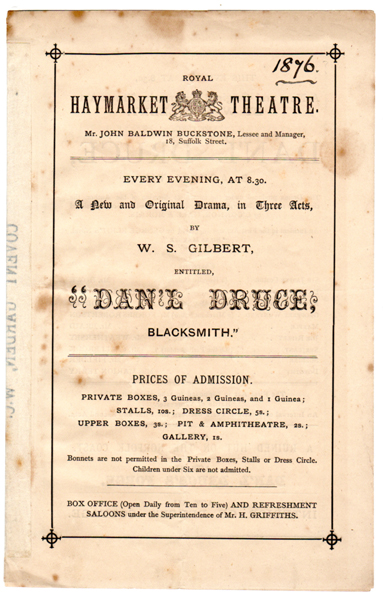
Programme from the original 1876 production

Dan'l Druce, Blacksmith is a play by W. S. Gilbert, styled "A Three-Act Drama of Puritan times". It opened at the Haymarket Theatre in London on 11 September 1876, starring Hermann Vezin, Johnston Forbes-Robertson and Marion Terry. The play was a success, running for about 100 performances and enjoying tours and several revivals. It was popular enough to be burlesqued in a contemporary work, Dan'l Tra-Duced, Tinker, at the Strand Theatre. In an 1894 revival, Nancy McIntosh played Dorothy.

The text notes that "An incident in the First Act was suggested by George Eliot's Novel Silas Marner".

== Background ==
Gilbert and Sullivan had already produced their hit one-act comic opera Trial by Jury by the time Dan'l Druce was written, but both Gilbert and Arthur Sullivan were still producing a considerable amount of work separately. The comic actor Edward Sothern had contacted Gilbert, in April 1875, noting that he was taking over the management of the Haymarket Theatre and needed a play for December, though Sothern did not plan to appear in the play. Gilbert was unable to complete the play on time and asked for an extension. Sothern then left to go on tour in America and wrote to Gilbert to be ready with another play by October, this time to feature him in a serious role. That play, The Ne'er-do-Weel, was also late and did not open until 1878. Hermann Vezin took the title role in Dan'l Druce in a cast featuring Johnston Forbes-Robertson and the 19-year-old Marion Terry as Dorothy.

The title character was originally called Jonas Marple, but Gilbert changed the name to one less closely identifiable with George Eliot's Silas Marner (published in 1861), first to Abel Druce and then to Dan'l Druce. He also changed the character's occupation from weaver to blacksmith, and altered Eliot's story to make Druce the true father of the child who is left at his house in place of his stolen gold. Bits of Dan'l Druce would echo in later operas. For instance, one of Reuben's speeches, beginning "I will so coll thee, coax thee, cosset thee, court thee, cajole thee, with deftly turned compliment, pleasant whimsy, delicate jest and tuneful madrigal" has similarities with Jack Point's speech in Act II of The Yeomen of the Guard. Elements of the characters of Dorothy and Geoffrey are later seen in Rose Maybud and Richard Dauntless in Ruddigore. The play ran for 119 performances and enjoyed tours in Britain and America and revivals, achieving reasonable popularity, and even gaining a burlesque parody, Dan'l Tra-Duced, Tinker, by Arthur Clements.

== Synopsis ==
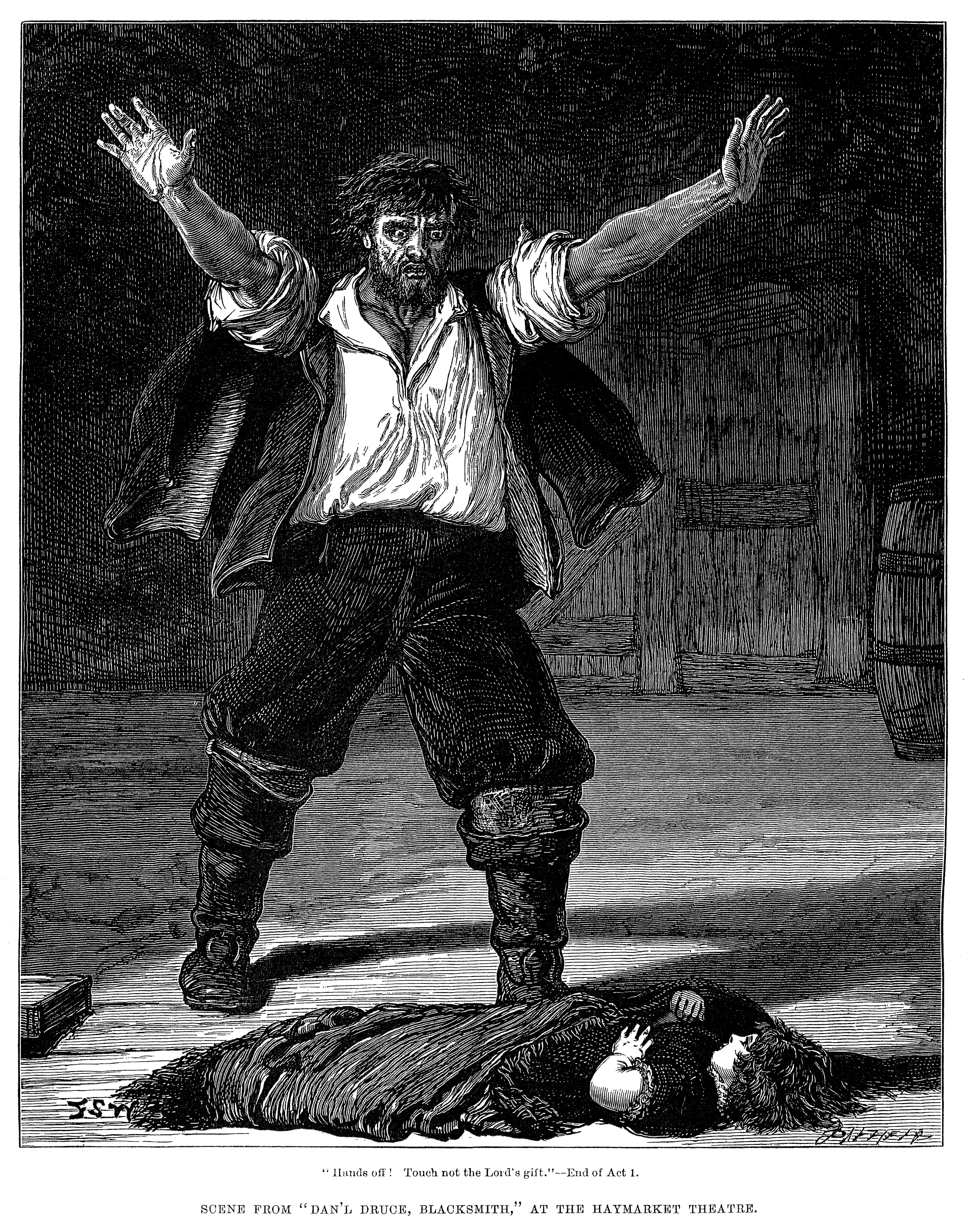
Hermann Vezin in the title role

Dan'l is a miser and a drunkard whose wife has eloped. Two deserters from the Battle of Worcester seek shelter at his house. They send him to buy food and steal his money, then run off, leaving at his cottage a baby girl with a note that says that his gold has taken the form of the baby. Fourteen years later, Dan'l is a blacksmith. The villains return, but Dan'l does not want to surrender the now-teenaged girl. Ultimately, she stays with Dan'l and marries her young sweetheart. In the words of a review from the Illustrated London News of 16 September 1876:

The hero is a man who has suffered wrong in society, and been disappointed both in love and friendship. He has found refuge from an unsatisfactory world in a ruined hut on the Norfolk coast, where he devotes himself to the cultivation of the avaricious sentiment, worshipping his gold as a "bairn" of his own invention, which increases in size and worth with its years. A Royalist colonel and sergeant, flying from the battle of Worcester, seek his protection, which most unwillingly he promises, and goes forth, as he pretends, to procure food. During his absence, the fugitives discover his treasures, and supply themselves with meat, drink, and money. They then escape to the coast; but they have been compelled to leave behind a female infant, which they decorate with a jewelled necklace, for her future recognition. Finding his gold gone and the child remaining, the superstitious blacksmith, who is a believer in miracles, imagines that the gold, which he had long considered as his growing child, has taken the shape of a foundling babe, and accepts at once with rapture the charge implied in its possession. This is the point of which Mr. Vezin avails himself, making of it an exceedingly fine situation. At the commencement of the second act the young lady is fourteen years old; and a young gentleman – or, rather, merchant-sailor – of the name of Geoffrey Wynyard, is accepted as her lover, both by the interesting foundling and her guardian blacksmith. They are discovered by the colonel and sergeant, in the shape of Sir Jasper Combe (Mr. Howe) and of Reuben Haines (Mr. Odell); the former being recognised by Dan'l Druce at once as the fugitive who formerly solicited his assistance. Druce fears that the right father of the maiden, Dorothy (Miss Marion Terry), has come at last to deprive him of his adopted child – ultimately, it is discovered that she is his own daughter; or that the sailor-youth will appropriate her as his wife. Geoffrey Wynyard, too, has fears lest Haines, who is a whimsical fop, with a large amount of cavalier learning and impudence, should succeed in his suit with Dorothy, whom in his absurd manner he affects to love; and, as a ruse, seeks to throw the bewildered sergeant off his guard by speaking rather sportively of the maiden. In the third act this difficulty, however, is got over, and explanations are made by which impediments are removed, and the lovers rendered permanently happy.

== Roles and original cast ==
- Sir Jasper Combe, a Royalist Colonel – Mr. Howe
- Dan'l Druce – Hermann Vezin
- Reuben Haines, a Royalist Sergeant – E. J. Odell
- Geoffrey Wynyard, a Merchant Sailor – Johnston Forbes-Robertson
- Marple – Mr. Braid
- Joe Ripley, a Fisherman – Mr. Weathersby
- Sergeant of the Parliamentary Army – C. Allbrook
- Soldier of the Parliamentary Army – Mr. Fielder
- Dorothy – Marion Terry

== Critical response ==
The audience was enthusiastic, and the critics generally gave the piece, and particularly Vezin and Terry, a warm reception. According to the Illustrated London News of 16 September 1876:

There is much good in Mr. W. S. Gilbert's new three-act drama. ... The conclusion of the [first] act, indeed, gives Mr. Hermann Vezin an opportunity of a striking attitude, which brings the curtain down on a tableau that excites expectation of a good plot. We have, however, lately been taught a salutary fear of overgood first-acts, which lead to ultimate anti-climaxes very disappointing to seemingly well-founded hopes. Mr. Gilbert's play is scarcely an exception to this statement, for, certainly, his second and third acts are not equal to his first; but the fact is not fatal to a well-earned triumph, owing to the general excellence of a representation involving much delicate interest, culminating in an acting hit by Mr. Hermann Vezin which literally electrified the house. Mr. Vezin is probably the most intellectual of our actors, and is the very man for creating an original part, such as that of Dan'l Druce. ... The reception of the play was throughout good; for the acting of the parts was irreproachable. Not only was Mr. Vezin excellent, but Mr. Odell revelled in the humour with which the author had plentifully supplied him. Mr. Forbes Robertson was, indeed, the prince of lovers, and Miss Marion Terry wonderfully pathetic. Mr. Howe was faultless in the dignified part of Sir Jasper Combe, and the minor rôles were all adequately filled, particularly that of Marple, the supposed miser's brother, by Mr. Braid. The metaphysical development implied in the dramatist's peculiar treatment of the subject had relation obviously to some theory in which the writer had believed; but fortunately it was not too abstruse for popular apprehension, though probably not fully understood.

A London-based French critic described the piece as "un grand succès", and The Theatre called the story "pure and true and elevated". However, when George Eliot attended a performance of the play shortly after the opening night, her husband recorded in his diary, "Wretched stuff, poorly acted". The author Walter Sichel commented that Gilbert himself would have laughed at the play, had it not been his own: "It tends occasionally to touch on the genre which Gilbert so often satirised."
