= David Cairns, 5th Earl Cairns =

Royal Navy Rear Admiral (1909–1989)

Rear-Admiral The Right Honourable The Earl Cairns GCVO CB DL
- Earl Cairns in 1950

President of the Royal Naval College, Greenwich
- In office 1958–1961
- Preceded by: Sir Geoffrey Barnard
- Succeeded by: Sir Alexander Gordon-Lennox

Personal details
- Born: David Charles Cairns; 3 July 1909
- Died: 21 March 1989 (aged 79)
- Awards: Knight Grand Cross of the Royal Victorian Order; Companion of the Order of the Bath

Military service
- Allegiance: United Kingdom
- Branch/service: Royal Navy
- Years of service: 1931–1961
- Rank: Rear-Admiral
- Commands: HMS Superb; Royal Naval College, Greenwich
- Battles/wars: World War II

Rear-Admiral David Charles Cairns, 5th Earl Cairns, GCVO, CB, DL (3 July 1909 – 21 March 1989), styled Viscount Garmoyle from 1942 to 1946, was Marshal of the Diplomatic Corps in the Royal Household of the Sovereign of the United Kingdom from 1962 to 1971.

== Early life ==
Cairns was born on 3 July 1909. He was the second son of Wilfred Cairns, 4th Earl Cairns, and Olive Cobbold. His elder brother, Brig. Hugh Cairns, Viscount Garmoyle, died unmarried at age 35 in 1942 at El Alamein, Egypt, from wounds received in action. Among his sisters were Lady Hester (who married Robert Bourne), Lady Ursula (who married John Roland Abbey), Lady Sheila (who married Maj. Charles Holroyd of the Rifles), and Lady Katharine (who was a Senior Commander in the Auxiliary Territorial Service).

His maternal grandfather was John Patteson Cobbold, MP for Ipswich. His paternal grandparents were Hugh Cairns, 1st Earl Cairns, a British statesman who served as Lord Chancellor during the first two ministries of Benjamin Disraeli, and the former Mary Harriet MacNeile.

== Career ==
Cairns joined the Royal Navy in 1923, and was promoted to the rank of lieutenant in 1931. He served in World War II and succeeded as the 5th Earl Cairns in 1946, then was promoted to captain on 30 Jun 1949, before becoming deputy director of the Signal Department at the Admiralty in 1950. He went on to be Commanding Officer of the cruiser HMS Superb in 1956. Following promotion to rear admiral on 7 July 1958, he was appointed President of the Royal Naval College, Greenwich, in 1958 before retiring in 1961.

=== Later life ===
In retirement Cairns was Marshal of the Diplomatic Corps in the Royal Household of the Sovereign of the United Kingdom from 1962 to 1971. He was also a Liveryman of the Worshipful Company of Fishmongers of the City of London, rising to become the company's Prime Warden for 1972–73, and for many years was Chairman of the Governing Body of Gresham's School. In 1973, he served as Deputy Lieutenant of Suffolk.

== Personal life ==
On 16 April 1936, David married Barbara Jeanne Harrison Burgess, a daughter of Sydney Harrison Burgess. Together, they were the parents of:

- Simon Dallas Cairns, 6th Earl Cairns (b. 1939), who married Amanda Mary Heathcoat-Amory (granddaughter of Maj. Ludovic Heathcoat-Amory).
- Hon. Hugh Andrew David Cairns (b. 1942), who married Elizabeth Bell, daughter of Lt.-Col. Francis Cecil Leonard "Bill" Bell.
- Lady Elisabeth Olive Cairns (1944–1998), who married Capt. Martin Ralph Lowe, son of Maj. Ralph Mason Lowe.

Lord Cairns died on 21 March 1989. On his death in 1989 he was succeeded by his eldest son, Simon.

Military offices
Preceded by Sir Geoffrey Barnard	President, Royal Naval College, Greenwich; 1958–1961	Succeeded by Sir Alexander Gordon-Lennox
Peerage of the United Kingdom
Preceded by Wilfred Cairns	Earl Cairns; 1946–1989	Succeeded by Simon Cairns
Preceded by Wilfred Cairns	Baron Cairns; 1946–1989	Succeeded by Simon Cairns
