= May Fortescue =

English actress, singer and theatre manager (1862–1950)

May Fortescue in an 1886 carte de visite

May Fortescue (9 February 1859 – 2 September 1950) was an English actress, singer and actor-manager of the Victorian era and a protégée of playwright W. S. Gilbert. She was a member of the D'Oyly Carte Opera Company from 1881 to 1883, when she left the company following her engagement to a nobleman, young Arthur Cairns, Lord Garmoyle (later the 2nd Earl Cairns). Cairns soon broke off the engagement under pressure from his friends, and Fortescue returned to the stage in leading roles.

With the £10,000 that she received in her breach of promise lawsuit, Fortescue started her own touring theatre company, often performing the plays of W. S. Gilbert. Coincidentally, Gilbert visited Fortescue on the day he died. Her acting career continued until 1926.

== Early career ==
Born Emily May Finney in Kensington, London, to a coal merchant father, Fortescue was educated as a lady, but following her father's business failure she became an actress to support her mother and sister, who became an actress under the name Helen Ferrers.

Fortescue first joined the D'Oyly Carte Opera Company at the Opera Comique in London, at the age of 19, in the original production of Gilbert and Sullivan's opera Patience, in April 1881, originating the role of Lady Ella. When the company transferred in October 1881 to the new Savoy Theatre, Fortescue moved with it, creating the small role of Celia in Iolanthe when it received its premiere in November 1882.

Programme for Sweethearts, Academy of Music, Buffalo, 1886

Fortescue, admired for her beauty, quickly became a favourite of male members of the Savoy's audience. In early 1883, an officer of the Hussars claimed that he was having an affair with her. When W. S. Gilbert learned of this, he found the man and forced him to sign a public apology admitting that the rumour was false and to pay the costs of a lawsuit by Fortescue. Soon afterwards, in a case of life imitating art, since her character, Celia, captivates and marries an Earl (which was much remarked upon in the press), Fortescue captured the interest of young Arthur Cairns, Lord Garmoyle (later the 2nd Earl Cairns), who had seen her on stage in Iolanthe. He proposed marriage, and she accepted, leaving the Savoy at the end of August 1883. Fortescue never appeared in another comic opera.

== Engagement and return to the stage ==
Although his family accepted Fortescue, according to The New York Times, Lord Garmoyle's friends could not accept his engagement to an actress, and he broke off the engagement in January 1884, leaving the country to travel in Asia. Fortescue, assisted by W. S. Gilbert's solicitors, sued Lord Garmoyle for breach of promise. The case generated a great deal of publicity for Fortescue, although much of it was adverse after she announced that she intended to resume her stage career. Gilbert cast her in her first major role, as Dorothy, in a revival of his play, Dan'l Druce, Blacksmith, at the Court Theatre in March 1884.

With the £10,000 in damages she received from Lord Garmoyle, Fortescue started her own theatre company. She toured with her company for many years, frequently performing the plays of W. S. Gilbert. A tour of the United States from 1886 to 1887 included the New York premiere of Gilbert's play Gretchen, with Fortescue in the title role (although The New York Times found her performance wanting). During these touring years, she revived at least eight other works by Gilbert, playing such roles as Jenny Northcott in Sweethearts, Galatea in Pygmalion and Galatea, Selene in The Wicked World and Clarice in Comedy and Tragedy. Fortescue's troupe premiered Gilbert's 1897 drama, The Fortune Hunter, in which she played Diana. In 1899, she created the role of the Duchess of Strood in Arthur Wing Pinero's play The Gay Lord Quex at the Globe Theatre in London, in a starry cast led by John Hare and Irene Vanbrugh.

== Later years ==
Original programme for The Fortune Hunter

Fortescue remained a friend of Gilbert's for the rest of his life, sometimes dining with him and his wife. On 29 May 1911, Gilbert visited Fortescue at her home after she had been injured in a horseback-riding accident that had affected her optic nerve. She was resting in a darkened room, and her mother said to Gilbert, "I won't ask what you think of her appearance, for you can scarcely see her." Gilbert replied, "Her appearance matters nothing. It is her disappearance we could not stand." The same afternoon, after lunch with W. H. Kendal, Gilbert died of heart failure while trying to rescue a young lady swimming in the lake at his home, Grim's Dyke.

Though various people have accused Gilbert of being prickly, Fortescue defended him:

I have seen Gilbert show the patience of Job towards honest stupidity; but what he could not stand was the people who could do and wouldn't. His kindness was extraordinary. On wet nights and when rehearsals were late and the last buses were gone, he would pay the cab-fares of the girls whether they were pretty or not, instead of letting them trudge home on foot. In financial matters he was a great gentleman. We never had or needed a written agreement. He was practical and business-like, but incapable of petty meanness. He was just as large-hearted when he was poor as when he was rich and successful. For money as money he cared less than nothing. Gilbert was no plaster saint, but he was an ideal friend.

Fortescue acted in plays in London and the provinces for over 40 years, playing such roles as Lady Teazle in School for Scandal. Her final London appearance was in 1926 in A Man Unknown, as Mrs. Deveraux, at the Court Theatre.

She died in London in 1950, at the age of 91.
