= Theatre Royal, Birmingham =

Coordinates: 52.47915°N 1.9003°W

Theatre Royal
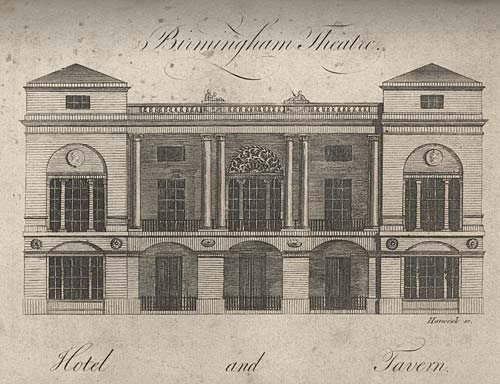
- The Theatre Royal in 1780
- Former names: New Street Theatre

General information
- Type: Theatre
- Location: New Street, Birmingham, England
- Opened: 1774
- Demolished: 1956

The Theatre Royal, until 1807 the New Street Theatre, or, colloquially, New Theatre, was a 2,000-seat theatre located on New Street in Birmingham, England. It was erected in 1774, rebuilt several times, and demolished in 1956.

== First building ==
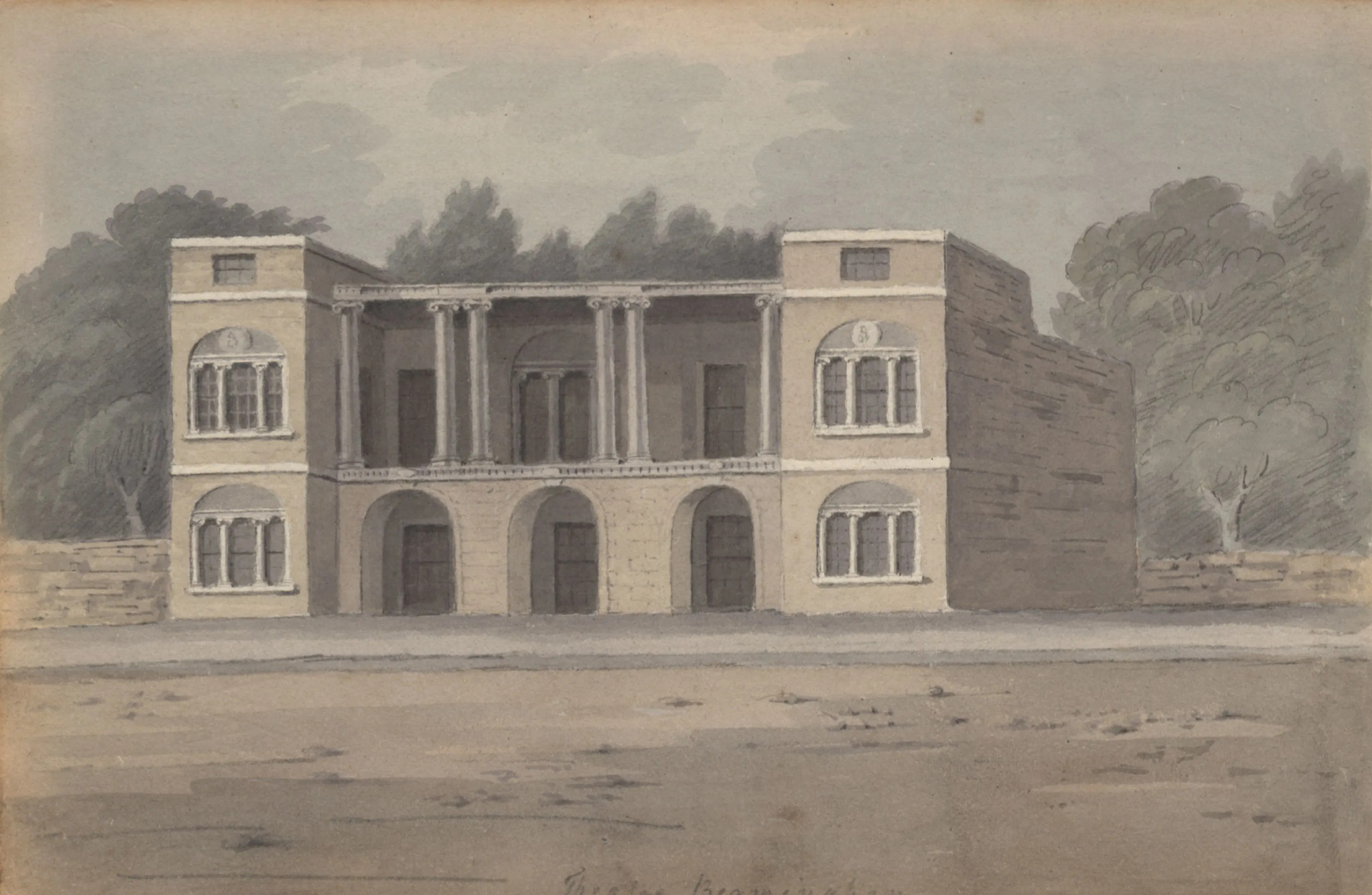
The theatre, c. 1774–1779, in a watercolour painting attributed to Hubert Cornish

The New Street Theatre opened in 1774. It was badly damaged by fire in 1792 as a result of arson.

== Second building ==
The theatre was rebuilt and reopened in 1795. In 1807, it was renamed The Theatre Royal and became a patent theatre by the Birmingham Theatre Act 1807 (47 Geo. 3 Sess. 2. c. xliv).

== Third building ==
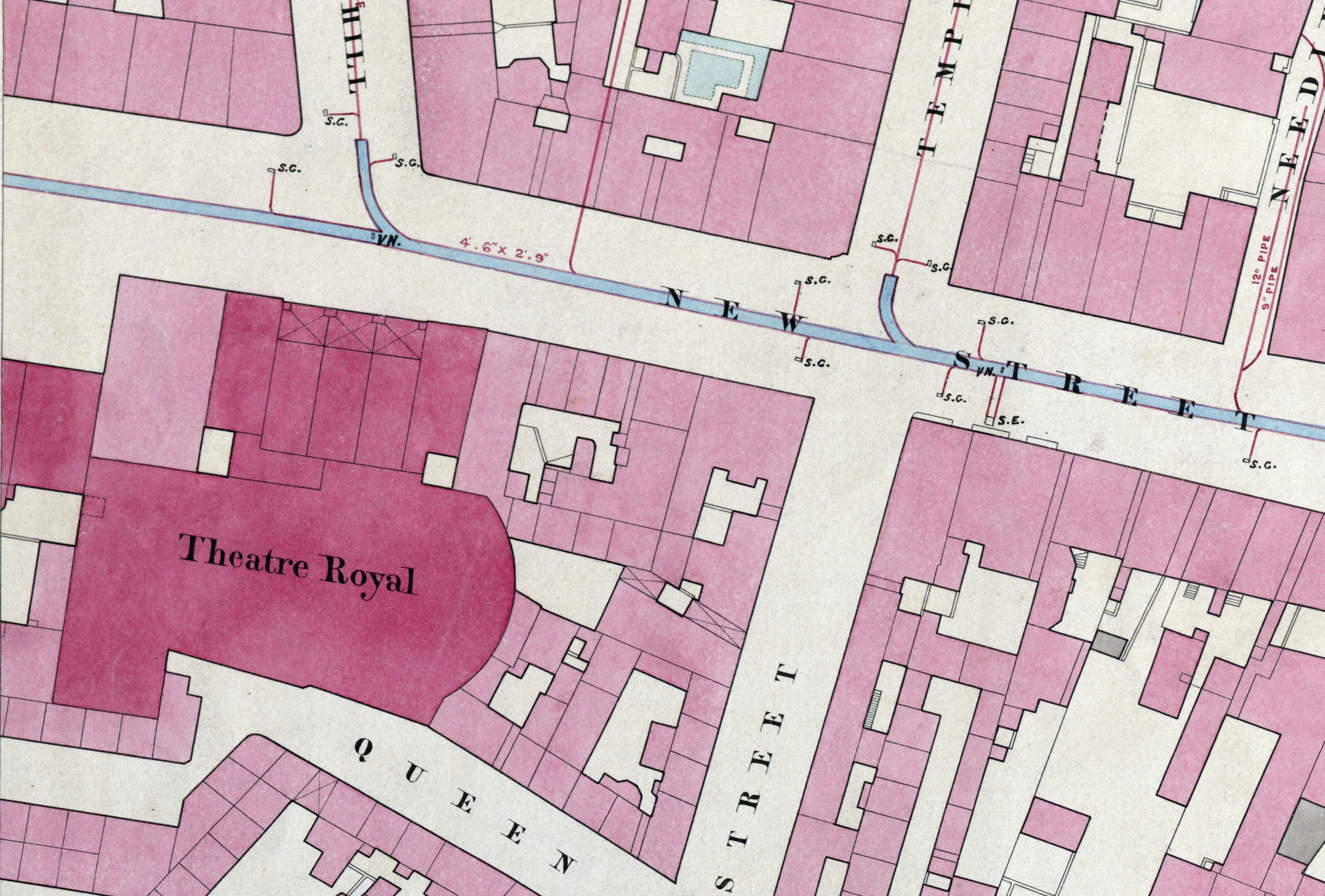
The theatre on the 1855 New Survey of the Borough of Birmingham. Queen Street no longer exists.

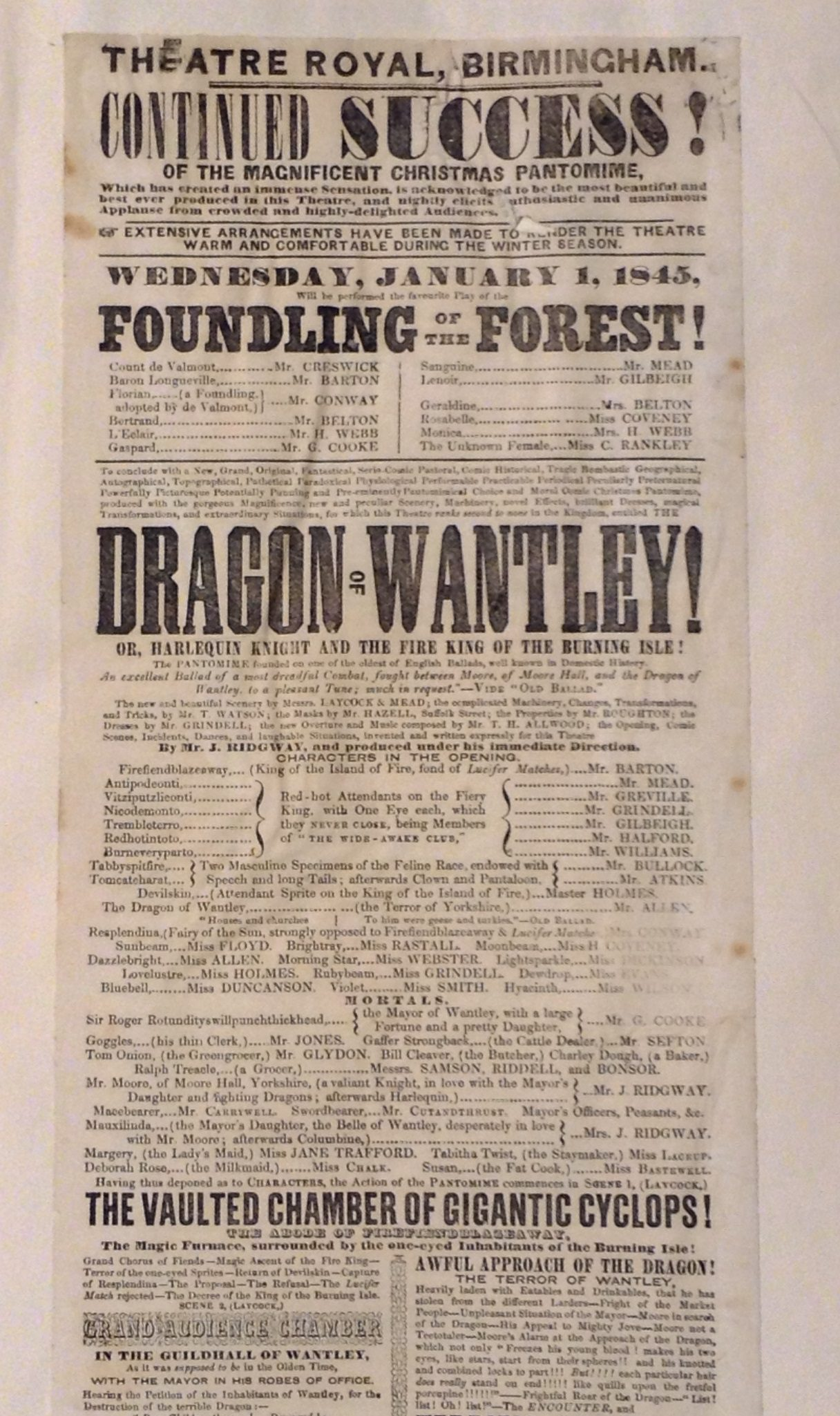
Playbill from December 1844 advertising events in January 1845

After another fire in 1820 it was again rebuilt. In 1848 Charles Dickens' Amateur Theatrical Company performed at the theatre as part of Dickens' efforts to raise funds for the curatorship of William Shakespeare's house in Stratford-upon-Avon.

Showell's Dictionary of Birmingham records that on 16 February 1873 a boy fell from the gallery and died. In 1897 W. S. Gilbert's The Fortune Hunter premiered at the theatre.

== Fourth building ==
The theatre was rebuilt again in 1902, designed by Ernest Runtz, reopening in 1904 with 2,200 seats. This building lasted until 1956 when it was closed and demolished.

== Legacy ==
Location, with blue plaque, seen in 2016

The Woolworth Building was subsequently constructed on the site, and the site is now the location of branches of a Superdrug store and Bella Italia restaurant.

Two large coade stone medallions from the front of the theatre, depicting David Garrick (on the viewer's left) and William Shakespeare, survive and are now displayed in the Library of Birmingham.

The theatre is commemorated by a blue plaque on its former location.
