= Arthur Cairns, 2nd Earl Cairns =

British earl

The Right Honourable The Earl Cairns
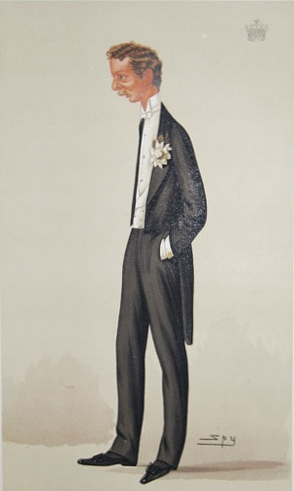
- Earl Cairns as caricatured by "Spy" (Leslie Ward) in Vanity Fair, January 1886.

Personal details
- Born: Arthur William Cairns; 21 December 1861 London, England
- Died: 14 January 1890 (aged 28) Mayfair, London
- Spouse: Olivia Elizabeth Berens (m. 1887)
- Relations: Herbert Cairns, 3rd Earl Cairns (brother)
- Parent(s): Hugh Cairns, 1st Earl Cairns; Mary Harriet MacNeile
- Education: Wellington College; Eton College
- Alma mater: Trinity College, Cambridge

Arthur William Cairns, 2nd Earl Cairns (21 December 1861 – 14 January 1890), was a British aristocrat, succeeding to the title on the death of his father, the first Earl Cairns, on 2 April 1885.

== Early life ==
Born in London in 1861, he was the second but eldest surviving son of Mary Harriet (née MacNeile; 1833–1919) and Hugh MacCalmont Cairns, 1st Earl Cairns, a British statesman who served as Lord Chancellor of the United Kingdom during the first two ministries of Benjamin Disraeli.

Arthur Cairns was educated at Wellington College in Berkshire. Between 1875 and 1876 he attended Eton College, going on to study at Trinity College, Cambridge.

== Career ==
Cairns became Private Secretary to the President of the Board of Trade. He succeeded to the titles of 2nd Baron Cairns of Garmoyle, County Antrim, and 2nd Earl Cairns, County Antrim, upon the death of his father on 2 April 1885.

== Personal life ==
On 20 November 1884, Cairns was successfully sued for £10,000 for breach of promise of marriage by Emily Mary Finney (an actress with the stage name of May Fortescue).

He had seen her on stage in Gilbert and Sullivan's opera Iolanthe and the two struck up a relationship. He proposed marriage, and she accepted, leaving the Savoy Theatre at the end of August 1883. Although his family accepted Fortescue, according to The New York Times, Cairn's friends could not accept his engagement to an actress, and he broke off the engagement in January 1884, leaving the country to travel in Asia. Fortescue, assisted by W. S. Gilbert's solicitors, sued him for breach of promise, receiving £10,000 in damages.

He was also engaged to the New York heiress Adele Grant, but she broke off the engagement shortly before their wedding (and later married George Capell, 7th Earl of Essex, in 1893).

=== Marriage and issue ===
On 19 December 1887, he was married to Olivia Elizabeth Berens OBE at St. Mary's Church, Bryanston Square, Marylebone, London. His wife was a daughter of Alexander Augustus Berens and Louisa Winifred Stewart. Together, they were the parents of:

- Lady Louise Rosemary Kathleen Virginia Cairns MBE (1889–1962), who married Wyndham Portal, 1st Viscount Portal, in 1909.

Cairns died of pneumonia on 14 January 1890, aged 28, at 18 Queen Street, Mayfair, London. He was buried at Bournemouth in Hampshire. He died intestate, and his estate was administered in April 1890 at £5,135. Having only a daughter, his titles passed to his younger brother, Herbert John Cairns, 3rd Earl Cairns.

After his death, his widow remarried to Maj. Roger Cyril Hans Sloane-Stanley of Paultons in 1899 and had issue (the High Sheriff of Hampshire in 1913), before her own death on 20 June 1951.

Peerage of the United Kingdom
Preceded by Hugh Cairns	Earl Cairns; 1885–1890	Succeeded by Herbert Cairns
Preceded by Hugh Cairns	Baron Cairns; 1885–1890	Succeeded by Herbert Cairns
