= Herbert Cairns, 3rd Earl Cairns =

British earl

Herbert John Cairns, 3rd Earl Cairns (17 July 1863 – 14 January 1905), was a British peer.

Cairns was born in London, the third son of Hugh Cairns, 1st Earl Cairns, a British statesman who served as Lord Chancellor of the United Kingdom during the first two ministries of Benjamin Disraeli, and Mary Harriet MacNeile. He was educated at Wellington College, Berkshire. He was a partner in the Elswick Ordnance Company. He succeeded in the earldom on the death of his older brother, Arthur Cairns, 2nd Earl Cairns, on 14 January 1890.

Cairns died on 14 January 1905 aged 41 at Union Golf Club, Cannes, France; he was unmarried. Cairns was buried on 23 January 1905 at Bournemouth in Hampshire. He was succeeded in the earldom by his younger brother Wilfred Cairns, 4th Earl Cairns

Peerage of the United Kingdom
Preceded by Arthur Cairns	Earl Cairns; 1890–1905	Succeeded by Wilfred Cairns
Preceded by Arthur Cairns	Baron Cairns; 1890–1905	Succeeded by Wilfred Cairns
