= Mona K. Oram =

English actress

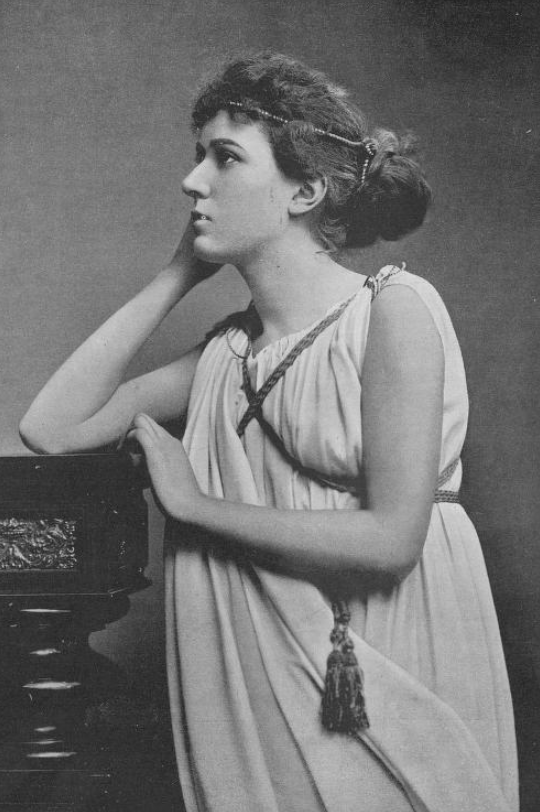
- Mona K. Oram, from an 1896 publication
- Born: Mona Kathleen Oram; 14 February 1874; Southport, Lancashire, U.K.
- Died: 13 February 1949 (age 74); Brighton, U.K.
- Other names: Mona Grenville, Mona Wheeler
- Occupation: Actress
- Spouse: Arthur Grenville

Mona Kathleen Oram (14 February 1874 – 13 February 1949) was an English stage actress in the 1890s and 1900s.

== Early life ==
Oram was born in Southport, Lancashire, the daughter of Henry Oram and Esther Allanson Oram.

== Career ==
Oram's London stage credits included A Scrap of Paper (1889, 1890), Money (1892), The Merchant of Venice (1895), An Old Garden (1895), Caste (1897 and 1899) with John Hare, When George the Fourth Was King (1897), A Case for Eviction (1898), A Bachelor's Romance (1898), again with John Hare, and Six and Eightpence (1899).

Outside London, Oram was often seen in Shakepearean roles in her career. In April 1894, she played Hero in Much Ado About Nothing, Queen Elizabeth in Richard III, Phebe in As You Like It, and the Duke of Clarence in Henry IV, Part 2, all at the Shakespeare Memorial Theatre in Stratford-upon-Avon. She was also in Julius Caesar in Bristol that year. In July 1900, in Fallowfield, she performed in a series of Shakespeare comedies at an open-air benefit for the Manchester and Salford medical charities, starring in Twelfth Night, As You Like It, and The Taming of the Shrew. "Miss Mona K. Oram was the Rosalind, a very bright and winsome Rosalind, full of fun and pertness, and yet withal a real woman, without an ounce of doublet and hose in her disposition," wrote a reviewer in 1900. "She vivifies the character into actual being, and compels sighs and laughter exactly as she chooses."

Oram created the role of Mrs. Jack Eden in the original cast of Arthur Wing Pinero's The Gay Lord Quex at London's Globe Theatre in 1899. She reprised the role in the original Broadway cast of The Gay Lord Quex (1900–1901). In 1904 she appeared in W. Somerset Maugham's A Man of Honour, opposite Ben Webster. In 1906 she played "an ill-natured gossip" in The School for Husbands at the Scala Theatre.

== Personal life ==
Oram was married to fellow actor Arthur Grenville in 1895, in Stratford-upon-Avon. The Grenvilles were in South Africa during the Boer War. She was a widow when she died in 1949, in Brighton, at age 74.
