= Simon Cairns, 6th Earl Cairns =

British businessman (born 1939)

The Right Honourable The Earl Cairns CVO CBE

Member of the House of Lords
- Lord Temporal
- In office 21 March 1989 – 11 November 1999
- Preceded by: The 5th Earl Cairns
- Succeeded by: Seat abolished

Personal details
- Born: Simon Dallas Cairns; 27 May 1939 (age 87)
- Party: Crossbencher
- Occupation: Businessman, politician, peer

Simon Dallas Cairns, 6th Earl Cairns, CVO, CBE (born 27 May 1939), styled Viscount Garmoyle between 1946 and 1989, is a British businessman.

== Background and education ==
Cairns is the son of Rear-Admiral David Cairns, 5th Earl Cairns, and Barbara Jeanne Harrison Burgess. He was educated at Ludgrove, Eton and Trinity College, Cambridge.

== Career ==
Cairns was Managing Director of S. G. Warburg & Co. between 1979 and 1985, of Mercury Securities plc between 1981 and 1984, Chairman of Voluntary Service Overseas (VSO) between 1981 and 1992, Vice-Chairman of Mercury Securities plc between 1984 and 1986, and a Director of S. G. Warburg & Co. between 1985 and 1995. He succeeded his father in the earldom on 21 March 1989. He was Receiver-General of the Duchy of Cornwall between 1990 and 2000. He was Chief Executive of S. G. Warburg & Co. between 1991 and 1995. He was Chairman of CDC Group plc from 1995.

He was chairman of BAT plc between 1995 and 1998, and was Vice-Chairman of Zurich Allied AG and Zurich Financial Services between 1998 and 2000. He was Chairman of Allied Zurich between 1998 and 2000.

He was appointed Chairman of the African telecommunications company Celtel in October 2007 and was a board member of the charity The Mo Ibrahim Foundation until 2016, alongside Mary Robinson and Kofi Annan.

== Honours ==
He was invested as a Commander, Order of the British Empire (CBE), in 1992. Cairns was invested as a Commander of the Royal Victorian Order (C.V.O.) in 2000.

== Family ==
Lord Cairns married Amanda Mary Heathcoat-Amory, daughter of Maj. Edward Fitzgerald Heathcoat-Amory (a son of Maj. Ludovic Heathcoat-Amory) and Sonia Myrtle Denison, on 4 February 1964. They have three sons:

- Hugh Sebastian Frederick Cairns, Viscount Garmoyle (born 26 March 1965).
- Hon. David Patrick Cairns (born 27 May 1967).
- Hon. Alistair Benedict Cairns (born 16 May 1969).

Peerage of the United Kingdom
Preceded by David Cairns	Earl Cairns; 1989–present Member of the House of Lords (1989–1999)	Incumbent; Heir apparent: Hugh Cairns, Viscount Garmoyle
Preceded by David Cairns	Baron Cairns; 1989–present	Incumbent; Heir apparent: Hugh Cairns, Viscount Garmoyle
