= Bill Bell (solicitor) =

British Army officer

Bill Bell DSO, MC, TD
- Born: 25 September 1912; Bourne, Lincolnshire, England
- Died: 20 December 2012 (aged 100) Chiddingfold, Surrey, England
- Allegiance: UK
- Branch: (United Kingdom) British Army
- Service years: 1932-1963
- Rank: Colonel
- Commands: 6th Battalion Lincolnshire Regiment
- Conflicts: World War II; Battle of Dunkirk; Battle of Sedjenane; Operation Avalanche; Battle of Monte Cassino; Battles of the Gothic Line; Greek Civil War
- Awards: Distinguished Service Order; Military Cross; Efficiency Decoration
- Education: Gresham's School
- Spouses: Mary Wynne Jacob (m. 1942–1966); Priscilla Muir (m. 1999)
- Children: 2

Colonel Francis Cecil Leonard "Bill" Bell, DSO, MC, TD (25 September 1912 – 20 December 2012), was a British Army officer who was decorated for his service during the Second World War. He later served as chief legal adviser to Lloyds Bank and as chairman of the European Legal Committee of the British Bankers' Association.

== Early life ==
Bell was born on 25 September 1912 in Bourne, Lincolnshire. He was educated at Gresham's School, a private school in Holt, Norfolk. During school he excelled at sport, especially hockey. He also joined the school's Junior Division of the Officer Training Corps, achieving the rank of Cadet Company Sergeant Major.

== Career ==
=== Early career ===
Bell qualified as a solicitor in 1936. On 25 June 1937, he joined the Board of Trade as a Junior Legal Assistant.

=== Military service ===
On 15 October 1932, Bell was commissioned into the 4th Battalion the Lincolnshire Regiment (TA) as a second lieutenant He was promoted to lieutenant on 15 October 1935.

With the outbreak of the Second World War, he became a full-time soldier and saw his first active service. In 1939, he went to France with the 6th Battalion, the Lincolnshire Regiment as part of the British Expeditionary Force. In late May/early June, with the fall of France to Nazi Germany, he was evacuated from Dunkirk in a Chinese river gunboat. He was a temporary captain at the time of the Battle of Dunkirk. He then spent the next two years serving in Britain with the 6th Lincolns, as part of the British anti-invasion preparations of the Second World War.

In 1943, Bell took part in the Tunisian campaign, having landed in Algiers in January 1943. During the campaign he was a temporary major, and a company commander in the 6th Lincolns. He later served as temporary commanding officer of the battalion during the final stages of the North African campaign, because its previous commander had been killed in action. Bell also took part in the Italian Campaign, landing at Salerno in September 1943. He was officer commanding "B" Company during the landings and during the Battle of Monte Cassino. In July 1944, he once more took command of the Battalion, and in September it was involved in the breaking of the Gothic Line, the last major German line of defence in Italy along the Alpines. During this time he was an acting lieutenant colonel.

He ended the war as a lieutenant (war substantive major). On 11 April 1945, he was promoted to captain. He transferred to the Parachute Regiment (Territorial Army) on 13 February 1950 as a major with seniority from 25 September 1946. On 28 November 1952, he transferred back to the Royal Lincolnshire Regiment and was granted the honorary rank of lieutenant colonel. Having reached the age limit, he retired from the Territorial Army on 2 January 1963, retaining the honorary rank of lieutenant colonel.

=== Post-war career ===
After leaving full-time military service at the end of the War, Bell returned to his legal career. In 1946, he returned to the legal department of the Board of Trade. In 1953, he moved from public to private service when he became a legal advisor for Lloyds Bank. He went on to become chief legal adviser. He retired from the bank in 1977. Later, he was made a director of the British Bankers' Association and chairman of its European Legal Committee.

In retirement, Bell remained connected to his past military service. He served as president of the Battalion Benevolent Fund and was also president of his local branch of the Royal British Legion. He lived in Chiddingfold, Surrey, until his death on 20 December 2012.

== Personal life ==
In 1942, Bell married firstly Mary Wynne Jacob. Together they had two children, a son and a daughter, but his first wife predeceased him. On 22 October 1966, his daughter Elizabeth Bell married The Hon. Hugh Andrew David Cairns, second son of Rear-Admiral the Earl Cairns. In 1999 Bell himself married secondly Priscilla Muir. They did not have any children. She survived him, along with the two children of his first marriage.

== Honours and decorations ==
On 20 December 1940, it was gazetted that Bell had been Mentioned in Despatches 'in connection with operations in the field. March–June, 1940'. On 22 April 1943, he was awarded the Military Cross (MC) 'in recognition of gallant and distinguished services in North Africa'. It was gazetted on 23 September 1943, that he had been further Mentioned in Despatches 'in recognition of gallant and distinguished services in North Africa'. He was Mentioned in Despatches 'in recognition of gallant and distinguished services in Italy'. On 13 December 1945, he was appointed Companion of the Distinguished Service Order (DSO) 'in recognition of gallant and distinguished services in Italy'. He also received a number of campaign medals for his World War II service: the 1939–45 Star, the Africa Star, and the Italy Star.

On 16 February 1951, he was awarded the Territorial Efficiency Decoration (TD) with Clasp for long service in the Territorial Army. He was appointed Honorary Colonel of the 4/6th Battalion, The Royal Lincolnshire Regiment (TA) on 18 August 1963. He relinquished the appointment on 31 March 1967. He was appointed Honorary Colonel of the Royal Lincolnshire Regiment on 1 April 1967. He relinquished the appointment on 31 March 1969.
