= The Gay Lord Quex (play) =

1899 play written by Arthur Wing Pinero

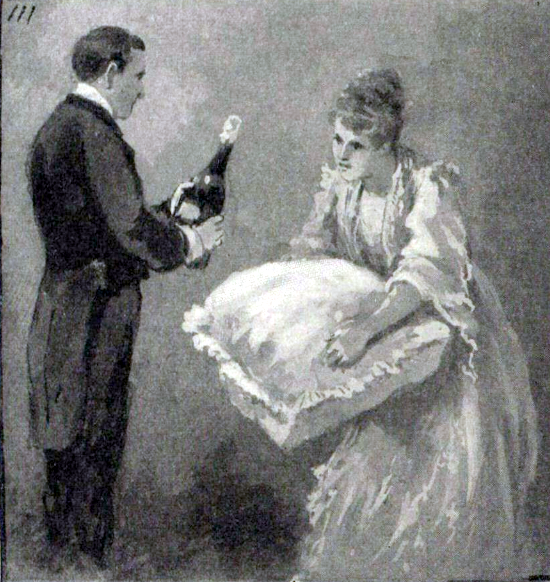
Lord Quex and the Duchess, with champagne bottle and cushion to muffle the pop of the cork

The Gay Lord Quex is an 1899 comedy play by the British playwright Arthur Wing Pinero. It depicts the vicissitudes of a reformed philanderer attempting to embark on monogamy. The original production provoked controversy, some critics finding the plot at best questionable and at worst immoral.

The play premiered at the Globe Theatre, London, on 8 April 1899, and ran for 300 performances. It was produced by John Hare, who also played the title role. Others in the cast included Charles Cherry, Frank Gillmore, May Fortescue, Irene Vanbrugh, Mona K. Oram, and Mabel Terry-Lewis. The play was revived in the West End in five productions during the 20th century and has been adapted for the cinema, radio and television.

== Background and original production ==
By 1899 Pinero was established as a leading playwright, with a series of long-running plays from the mid 1880s onwards. His works ranged from farces such as The Magistrate (1885) and Dandy Dick (1887) to more serious pieces including The Second Mrs Tanqueray (1893) and Trelawny of the 'Wells' (1898). Although most of his stage works had been critical and commercial successes, Pinero wrote The Gay Lord Quex in the wake of a conspicuous failure, a "romantic musical drama", The Beauty Stone, written jointly with J. Comyns Carr to music by Arthur Sullivan; it closed in July 1898 after only 50 performances. By contrast, The Gay Lord Quex, which opened at the old Globe Theatre on 8 April 1899 and ran until 9 February 1900, achieved 300 consecutive performances. After the London run, Hare and his company took the piece on tour in the British provinces and, in November 1900, to New York, where it played at the Criterion Theatre.

== Original cast ==
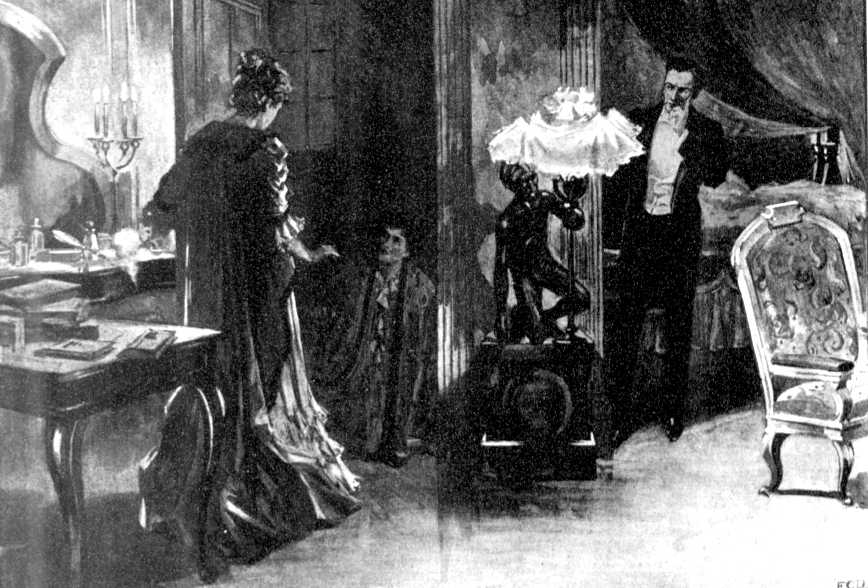
May Fortescue (standing), Irene Vanbrugh and John Hare in the climactic scene of the play

- The Marquess of Quex – John Hare
- Sir Chichester Frayne, Governor of a West African country – Gilbert Hare
- Captain Bastling – Charles Cherry
- "Valma" otherwise Frank Pollitt, a palmist – Frank Gillmore
- The Duchess of Strood – May Fortescue
- Julia, Countess of Owbridge – Fanny Coleman
- Mrs Jack Eden – Mona K. Oram
- Muriel Eden, her sister-in-law – Mabel Terry-Lewis
- Sophy Fullgarney, a manicurist – Irene Vanbrugh
- Misses Moon, Huddle, Claridge and Limard, her assistants – Laura McGilvray, Doris Templeton, Victoria Addison and Marion Dolby
- Patrons, servants, etc.

Source: The Era.

== Plot ==
Sophy Fullgarney is a manicurist whose clients include the Countess of Owbridge and the Duchess of Strood. The former is elderly and kind; the latter is younger and romantically inclined. They are both also clients of "Valma", the professional name of the palmist Frank Pollitt; he practises in the next door premises and is Sophy's fiancé. Sophy is the foster-sister of the beautiful Muriel Eden, and is set against Muriel's intended marriage to the notorious middle-aged roué, the Marquess of Quex. Sophy does not believe that he is, as he claims, a reformed character and believes a more suitable husband for her foster-sister would be the charming young Captain Bastling.

Lady Owbridge invites the other characters to her country house, where the Duchess, an old flame of Quex's, insists on his drinking a farewell glass of champagne in her room after dinner. It is a wholly innocent rendezvous, but would appear highly scandalous if others knew of it. Sophy spies on them, and is discovered. The Duchess hastily departs, leaving Quex and Sophy to confront each other. To avoid a scandal he attempts to bribe her to remain silent. He is impressed to find that her motives are not mercenary and that she is simply determined that he shall not marry Muriel. He points out that he has locked the door, and that if Sophy is discovered to be alone with him in a bedroom her fiancé would assuredly break off their engagement. Any scandal she causes will therefore be as damaging to her as to him. He convinces her that he is truly reformed and she promises not to stand in the way of his marriage to Muriel.

Quex is concerned that the handsome young Captain Bastling is a rival for Muriel's affections. Sophy tricks Bastling into revealing that he is as dissolute a philanderer as Quex used to be. Muriel sees how untrustworthy he is, and prefers the reformed Quex.

== Revivals ==
The play has had several West End revivals. The first was at the Duke of York's Theatre in 1902, followed by productions at Wyndham's Theatre in 1905 and the Garrick in 1908, Sir John Hare's farewell production of the piece, in which he played Quex to the Sophy of Nancy Price. A production at His Majesty's in 1923 was directed by Basil Dean and starred George Grossmith Jr. as Quex, Irene Browne as Sophy and Viola Tree as the Duchess. In 1975 Sir John Gielgud directed a production at the Albery Theatre, with Daniel Massey in the title role, Judi Dench as Sophy and Siân Phillips as the Duchess. An American production in 1917 was presented at the Thirty-Ninth Street Theatre, New York, with John Drew Jr. as Quex and Margaret Illington as Sophy.

== Reception ==
=== First production ===
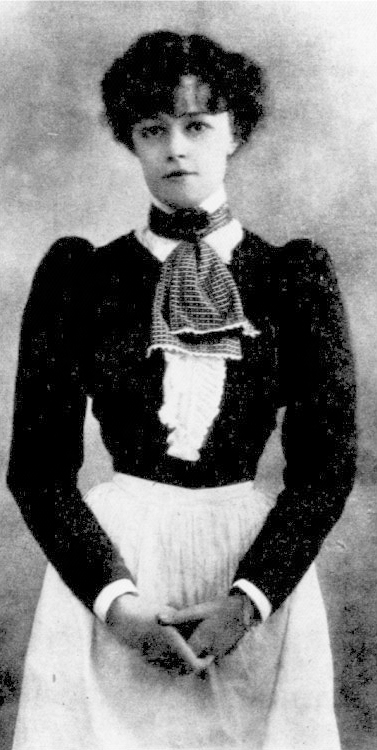
Vanbrugh as Sophy

The original production of the play sparked controversy. Some commentators objected to the plot. The Pall Mall Gazette praised the acting, found the plot implausible, and thought some playgoers would find the piece in questionable taste. The Standard regretted that at times the theme of the piece was "not very wholesome", but judged the best parts of it striking and effective. The Morning Post expressed minor reservations about the moral tone of the play, but was otherwise full of praise, making comparisons with Sheridan's The School For Scandal. The Graphic expressed no moral qualms and judged the play "brilliantly successful". The Era was also untroubled by the plot, finding that it hinged on "a moment of genuine ethical exaltation"; it concluded, "Mr Pinero's genius is as strong as ever". The Times commented that intellectually Pinero stood alone among British dramatists, and praised the "undeniable humanity and interest" of the piece, but wished it had sprung from something loftier than "a combat of wits between a roué, who has to shuffle out of a discreditable past, and a young woman who, though it be for a good motive, has descended to immodesty and mean cunning".

The Bishop of Wakefield, who had not seen it, denounced The Gay Lord Quex as "The most immoral play that ever disgraced the stage of this country". The theatrical newspaper The Era promptly ridiculed the bishop and pointed out that the play depicted a formerly wicked man renouncing his old ways and turning to constancy and virtue.

When the piece opened on Broadway, The New-York Evening Post concluded its review, "There should be no question of the success of Mr Hare's venture. He has an excellent company, and a play which, for unconventionality, deft workmanship and real interest, stands out as conspicuously as gratefully in the dreary wastes of the contemporary drama."

=== Revivals ===
The revivals in the 20th century received mixed notices, both for the play and the players. Reviewing the 1923 production the dramatic critic of The Times praised the play: "The dramatist, you feel throughout, has a story to tell, means to tell it for all it is worth, and will never let you down. The critic found Grossmith's Quex rather too self-effacing, but praised the two principal actresses. In The Manchester Guardian, Ivor Brown ridiculed Dean's decision to update the action to 1923, but praised the author's "narrative power … a triumph of talent and a rare good tale". The theatre critic of The Observer felt that the piece lacked subtlety, but was not without dramatic effectiveness.

Reviewing Gielgud's 1975 revival, Robert Cushman wrote in The Observer that the standard description of the play as a society drama was wrong, and that it was in fact "a social comedy with farcical interludes". Cushman praised Pinero's accomplished plotting and what he described as very funny dialogue, but found Dench's Sophy and Phillips's Duchess more completely convincing than Massey's Quex. In The Times, Jeremy Kingston, took a different view of Pinero's work: "the reason for choosing this play to revive is baffling". In Punch, Sheridan Morley commented that Gielgud had rightly been trying for years to get the play revived. Morley continued: "the play is less than perfect, which is to say it's marginally worse than The Importance of Being Earnest, but still more stylish and more intriguing than any comedy I can think of written between Wilde's and Private Lives which is all of forty years".

== Adaptations ==
The play was twice adapted into silent films: a British one in 1917, directed by Maurice Elvey, with Vanbrugh reprising her role, and an American one in 1919, directed by Harry Beaumont, starring Tom Moore.

An early television production of excerpts from the play, directed by Royston Morley, was broadcast by the BBC in April 1938. Morley also directed the BBC's first post-war television production of the play, with Ronald Ward as Quex (1947). Later BBC television versions were transmitted in 1953 with André Morell as Quex, with Joyce Heron and Alan Wheatley; and 1983, starring Anton Rodgers, Lucy Gutteridge and Hannah Gordon. BBC Radio broadcast versions of the play starring Peter Cushing (1954), Jack Hulbert (1964), and Nigel Patrick (1973).
