= Wilfred Cairns, 4th Earl Cairns =

British Army officer and peer (1865–1946)

Earl Cairns in 1917.

Lieutenant-Colonel Wilfred Dallas Cairns, 4th Earl Cairns, CMG, DL (28 November 1865 – 23 October 1946), was a peer of the United Kingdom and a Rifle Brigade officer.

== Life ==
Born in 1865, he succeeded as the 4th Earl Cairns on the death of his older brother, Herbert, in 1905.

He bought and restored Farleigh House at Farleigh Hungerford in Somerset and lived there for most of the second half of his life, during which time he was an active member of the Bath and County Club.

== Military career ==
Cairns was commissioned an officer in The Rifle Brigade, and served in the 3rd battalion. After retiring, he was on 9 February 1898 appointed a major of the 5th (Militia) battalion, previously the Queen's Own Royal Tower Hamlets Light Infantry (2nd Tower Hamlets Militia), based in Bethnal Green in the East End of London.

Following the outbreak of the Second Boer War, Cairns volunteers for service when his militia regiment was embodied in 1900. After peace was declared in May 1902, he left South Africa on board the SS Bavarian and arrived in the United Kingdom the following month.

== Marriage and family ==
On 12 July 1894, Cairns married Olive Cobbold, daughter of the former MP for Ipswich, John Patteson Cobbold. Together they had six children, four daughters and two sons.

Their eldest daughter, Hester, married Robert Bourne, the rower and politician. She served as vice-chairman of the Conservative Party. Their second daughter, Ursula, married John Roland Abbey. Their third daughter, Sheila, married Major Charles Holroyd of the Rifles. Their youngest daughter, Katharine, was a Senior Commander in the Auxiliary Territorial Service.

Their elder son Hugh, Viscount Garmoyle, was killed on active service during World War II, leaving their second son, David, as heir to the earldom.

Peerage of the United Kingdom
Preceded by Herbert Cairns	Earl Cairns; 1905–1946	Succeeded by David Cairns
Preceded by Herbert Cairns	Baron Cairns; 1905–1946	Succeeded by David Cairns
