= John Roland Abbey =

English book collector and high sheriff

Major John Roland Abbey (23 November 1894 – 24 December 1969) was an English book collector and high sheriff.

== Early life ==
He was the eldest of three sons of William Henry Abbey, a brewer, and his wife Florence Belcher. He was named John Rowland before dropping the 'w'. He attended Windlesham House School, Brighton from 1907 to 1909; and then was subsequently educated in nearby Rottingdean by a private tutor, Mr Möens, after an accident caused permanent damage to one of his elbows.

== Military career ==
In November 1914, at the start of World War I, he was commissioned as a regimental officer in the Rifle Brigade, serving for two years on the Western Front in the 13th and 8th Battalions. He experienced a lucky escape as part of the 8th Battalion; while he was serving in reserve, the battalion took part in the Battle of Flers-Courcelette, losing all officers but one. He was gassed in November 1916 and spent five months recovering in hospital before being invalided out in October 1917 and demobilised in 1919. His younger brother Lieutenant Noel Roland Abbey was killed on the Western Front in April 1918 while serving with the Grenadier Guards. Abbey later rejoined the Rifle Brigade in November 1939, and served from 1941 to October 1943 as staff officer to the Admiral-Superintendent at Great Yarmouth. He left the army in 1943 and was awarded the honorary rank of Major in 1946.

== Personal life ==
After the World War I Abbey became manager of the Kemp Town brewery, succeeding his father as chairman in 1943 and merging the company with Charringtons in 1954. On 7 June 1921, he married Lady Ursula Cairns, daughter of Wilfred Cairns, 4th Earl Cairns, with whom he had two daughters. In 1945, he was appointed High Sheriff of Sussex, a position he held for a year.

== Book collecting ==
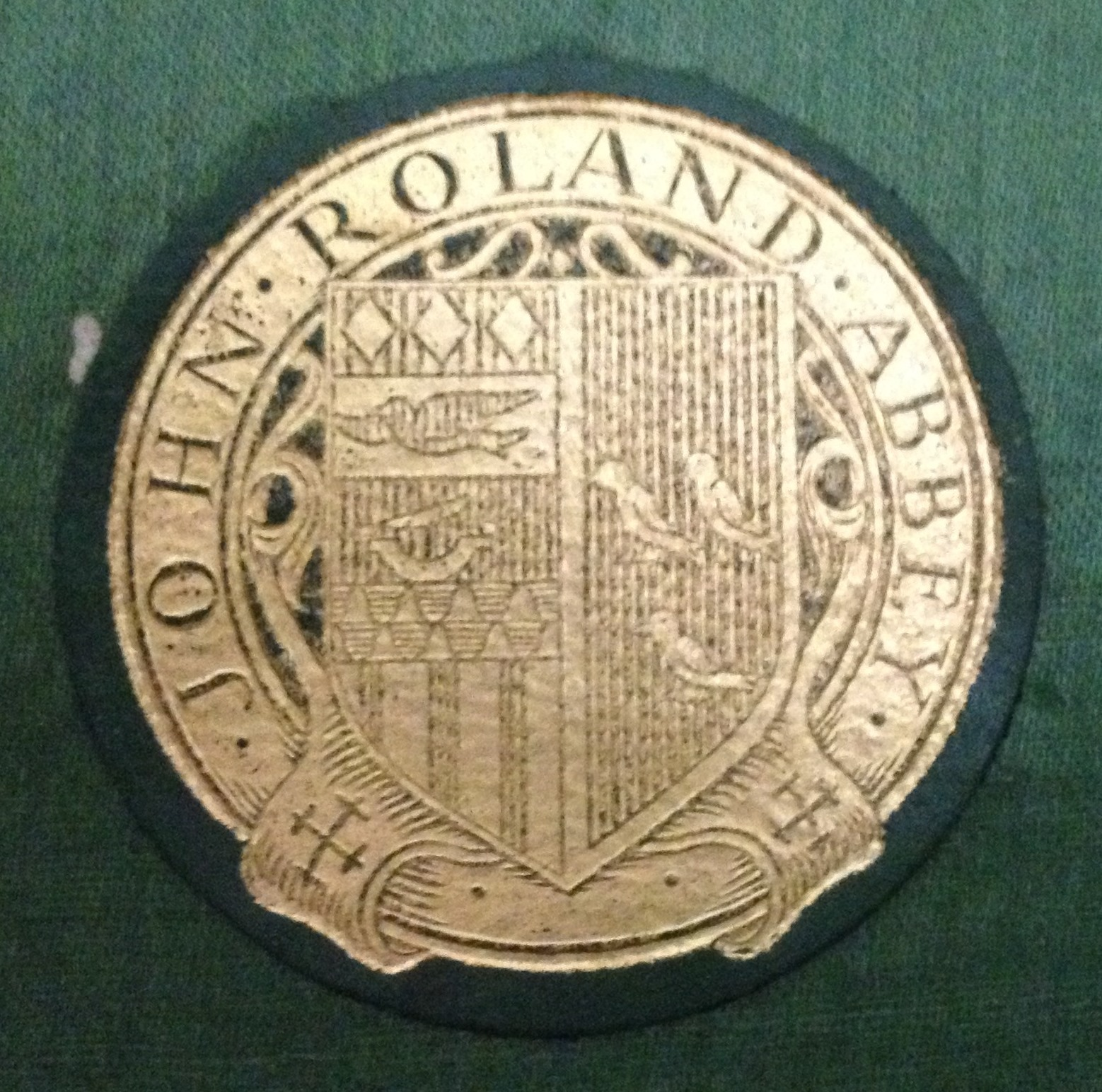
John Roland Abbey bookplate

Abbey would become the largest English book collector of his time. His book collecting started in 1929 buying books from various private presses, eventually gaining complete collections of books from the Kelmscott, Ashendene and Gwasg Gregynog presses. He also became interested in modern bindings, and in 1931 commissioned examples from Sybil Pye and, from R. de Coverley & Sons, a copy of Siegfried Sassoon's Memoirs of an Infantry Officer decorated with Abbey's coat of arms. He also collected antiquarian books, starting from the sale of Primrose's collection and building it up from 1936 to 1938 thanks to sales from the Mensing, Moss, Aldenham, Schiff, and Cortlandt F. Bishop collections, eventually holding over 13,000 books. He died on 24 December 1969 in London, and, with the exception of manuscripts given to his family and a group of books donated to the Eton College Collections, his remaining texts were sold for £993,509 between 1970 and 1975.

== Works ==
- English Bindings 1490-1940 in the Library of J. R. Abbey (1940)
- An Exhibition of Modern English and French Bindings from the Collection of Major J. R. Abbey (1949)
- Scenery of Great Britain and Ireland in Aquatint and Lithography, 1770-1860, from the Library of J. R. Abbey; a Bibliographical Catalogue (1952)
- Life in England in Aquatint and Lithography, 1770-1860: Architecture, Drawing Books, Art Collections, Magazines, Navy and Army, Panoramas etc., from the Library of J. R. Abbey; a Bibliographical Catalogue (1953)
- Travel in Aquatint and Lithography, 1770-1860, from the Library of J. R. Abbey; a Bibliographical Catalogue (in 2 vols., 1956)
- Catalogue of the Celebrated Valuable Printed Books and Fine Bindings from the Collection of Major J. R. Abbey. Sotheby & Co., (in 11 vols., 1965-78)

Honorary titles
Unknown	High Sheriff of Sussex; 1949–1950	Unknown
