= Earl Cairns =

Earldom in the Peerage of the United Kingdom

Earldom Cairns
- Arms: Gules, three Martlets Argent, within a Bordure of the second charged with three Trefoils slipped Vert; Crest: A Martlet Argent, charged on the breast with a Trefoil slipped Vert; Supporters: On either side a Hawk wings expanded proper, collared, belled and chained Or, holding in the beak a Trefoil slipped Vert.
- Creation date: 27 September 1878
- Created by: Queen Victoria
- Peerage: Peerage of the United Kingdom
- First holder: Hugh Cairns, 1st Earl Cairns
- Present holder: Simon Cairns, 6th Earl Cairns
- Heir apparent: Hugh Cairns, Viscount Garmoyle
- Remainder to: the 1st Earl's heirs male of the body
- Subsidiary titles: Viscount Garmoyle; Baron Cairns
- Motto: EFFLORESCO (I Flourish)

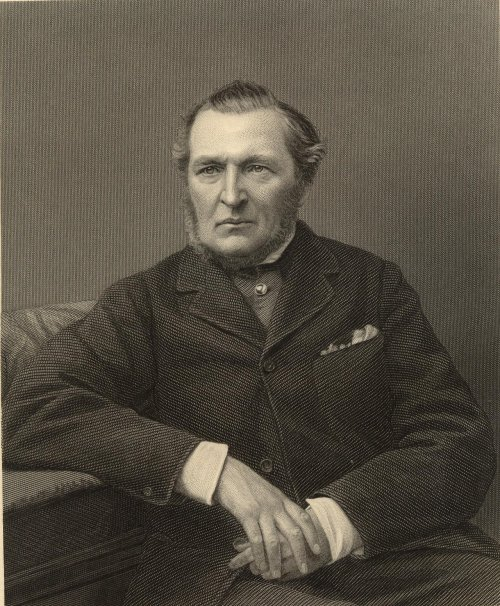
Hugh McCalmont Cairns, 1st Earl Cairns

Earl Cairns is a title in the Peerage of the United Kingdom. It was created in 1878 for the prominent lawyer and Conservative politician Hugh Cairns, 1st Baron Cairns. He was Lord High Chancellor of Great Britain in 1868 and from 1874 to 1880. Cairns had already been created Baron Cairns, of Garmoyle in the County of Antrim, in 1867, and was made Viscount Garmoyle, in the County of Antrim, at the same time he was given the earldom. These titles are also in the Peerage of the United Kingdom.

He was succeeded by his second but eldest surviving son, the second Earl. He died young without male issue and was succeeded by his younger brother, the third Earl. He never married and was succeeded by his younger brother, the fourth Earl. On his death the titles passed to his second but only surviving son, the fifth Earl. He was a Rear-Admiral in the Royal Navy. As of 2018, the titles are held by his son, the sixth Earl, who succeeded in 1989.

Sir William Cairns, half-brother of the first Earl, served as Governor of Queensland from 1875 to 1877.

== Baron Cairns (1867) ==
- Hugh McCalmont Cairns, 1st Baron Cairns (1819–1885) (created Earl Cairns in 1878)

=== Earl Cairns (1878) ===
- Hugh McCalmont Cairns, 1st Earl Cairns (1819–1885)
- Arthur William Cairns, 2nd Earl Cairns (1861–1890)
- Herbert John Cairns, 3rd Earl Cairns (1863–1905)
- Wilfred Dallas Cairns, 4th Earl Cairns (1865–1946)
- David Charles Cairns, 5th Earl Cairns (1909–1989)
- Simon Dallas Cairns, 6th Earl Cairns (born 1939)

The heir apparent is the present holder's eldest son, Hugh Sebastian Frederick Cairns, Viscount Garmoyle (born 1965), whose heir is his son, Hon. Oliver David Andrew Cairns (born 1993).

=== Male-line family tree ===
Male-line family tree, Earls Cairns

Hugh Cairns; 1st Earl Cairns; 1819–1885
Hugh Cairns ?–1858	Arthur Cairns; 2nd Earl Cairns; 1861–1890	Herbert Cairns; 3rd Earl Cairns; 1863–1905	Wilfred Cairns; 4th Earl Cairns; 1865–1946
Hugh Cairns; Viscount Garmoyle; 1907–1942	David Cairns; 5th Earl Cairns; 1909–1989
Simon Cairns; 6th Earl Cairns born 1939
Hugh Cairns; Viscount Garmoyle born 1965
Hon. Oliver Cairns born 1993
