= Exeter Theatre Royal fire =

1887 fire and crowd crush in Exeter, England

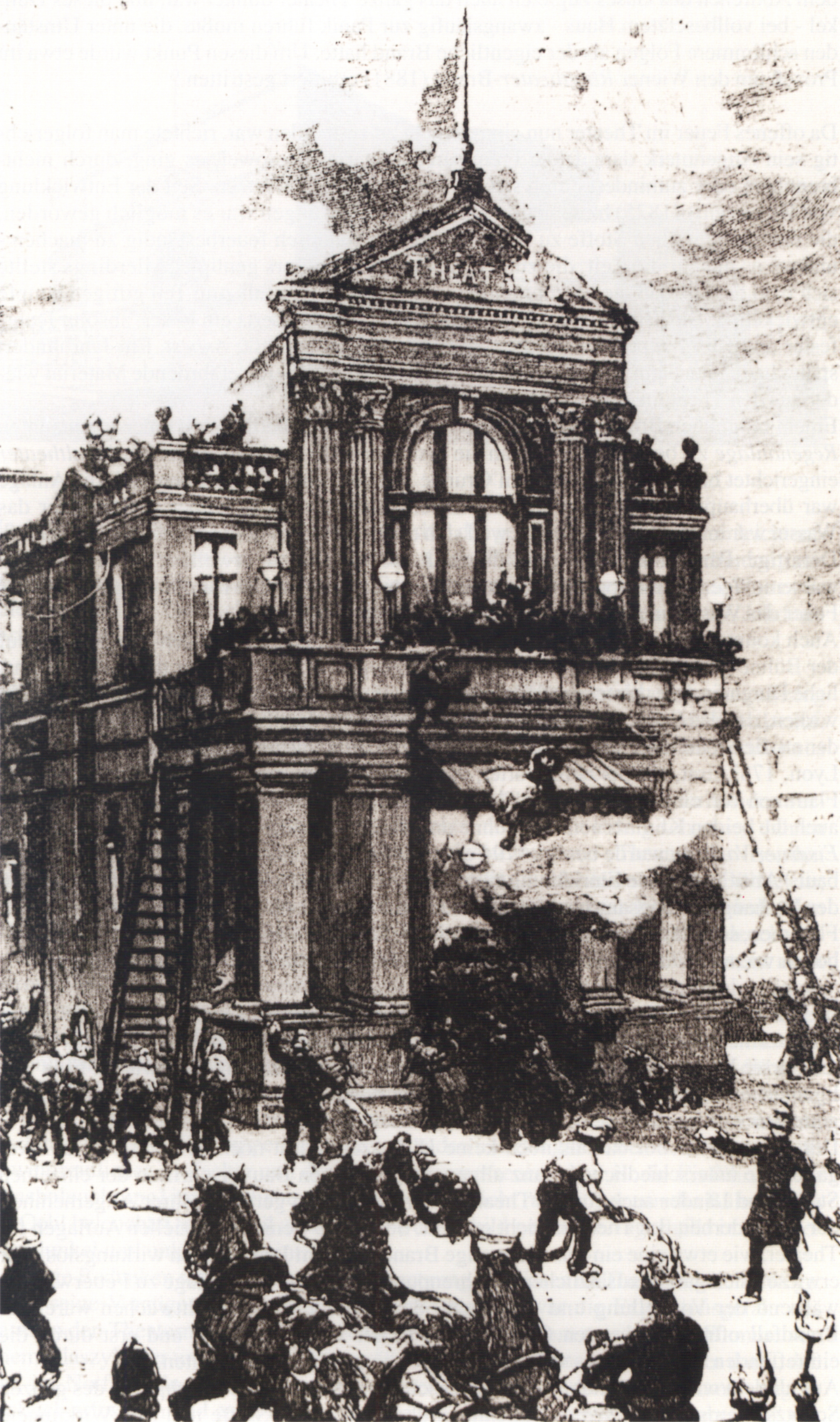
- Contemporary illustration of the fire
- Date: 5 September 1887
- Venue: Theatre Royal, Exeter, England
- Location: 50.7264°N 3.5274°W
- Also known as: Exeter disaster; Exeter theatre fire; Theatre Royal disaster
- Cause: Design failures by architect C. J. Phipps
- Deaths: 186
- Injuries: Dozens
- Property damage: Building destroyed
- Inquest: Coroner's inquest; Parliamentary inquiry
- Verdict: Accidental death

On 5 September 1887, a fire broke out in the backstage area of the Theatre Royal in Exeter, England, during the production of The Romany Rye. The fire caused panic throughout the theatre, with 186 people dying from a combination of the direct effects of smoke and flame, crushing and trampling, and trauma injuries from falling or jumping from the roof and balconies.

The death toll makes it the worst theatre disaster, the worst single-building fire, and the third worst fire-related disaster in UK history.

Most of the dead were in the gallery of the theatre, which had only a single exit with several design flaws, and quickly became clogged with people trying to escape.

== Construction of this Theatre Royal ==
The previous Theatre Royal, Exeter had been gutted by fire in 1885, and the new theatre was opened, on a new site, in 1886 to the design of well-known theatre architect C. J. Phipps. The theatre was leased exclusively to Sidney Herberte-Basing.

The building was constructed from stone and red brick on the outside, but inside made extensive use of timber.

The licensing authority, Exeter City Council ordered that the new theatre be constructed "in accordance with the rules and regulations of the Metropolitan Board of Works", which was a statutory requirement in London under the Metropolitan Building Act 1855 (18 & 19 Vict. c. 122) (with theatre particulars added in the Metropolis Management and Building Acts Amendment Act 1878), but not in the regions.

In his letter accompanying the plans to the Corporation Surveyor of Exeter City Council, Phipps directly states that the building met all the rules and requirements laid out:

...the theatre is designed in accordance with the rules and regulations of the Board of Works under the Act of 1878 (Note: Metropolis Management and Building Acts Amendment Act 1878) and of the Lord Chamberlain – and having constructed some 40 theatres, I bring a somewhat large experience to bear on this subject

— C. J. Phipps, Letter of 11 July 1885 from Phipps to the Corporation Surveyor of the City of Exeter

During the licensing inspection, the magistrates noted several deficiencies, which were ordered to be rectified, including installing an additional exit for the audience from the boxes, stalls, and pit, widening the exits to at least 6 feet (1.8 m), changing some single leaf exit doors to double doors, and supplying 80 feet (24 m) of hose for each hydrant (of which there were only two – one in the foyer and one in the "prompts" in front of the stage), rather than 40 feet (12 m) which had been provided.

The magistrates did not make an inspection of the stage, the mezzanine floor, or the fly galleries above the stage.

The theatre's design contained a gallery, which was the audience viewing area at the top of the building containing the cheapest seats, to which access and egress was limited to a single stone staircase, which had four right-angled turns in it. Licensing magistrates noted during the licensing hearing that the Metropolitan Board rules stated that there should be two exits, but Phipps asserted that a second exit was provided by climbing the railing at the front of the gallery, and dropping to the second circle below. Unlike several other faults which were noted with clear instructions to remediate, it is unclear in documentation whether the magistrates’ remarks about the exit required action, and the magistrates seemed to accept the assurances of the architect, issuing the licence.

The licensing requirements also specified the provision of an iron safety curtain, which was not fitted at the time of the fire. Similarly, a fire hydrant in the stage wings was on the plans of the theatre but never installed, despite Phipps being advised by Mssrs Merryweather, the installers of fire suppression measures, that the two hydrants installed were insufficient.

== Performance and fire ==
=== The play ===
The disaster occurred on 5 September 1887, the opening night of the touring production of the melodrama The Romany Rye written by George Robert Sims, performed by the company of Gilbert Elliott and produced by Wilson Barrett. The show had previously been staged at the Princess's Theatre in London.

The play had up to eighteen very elaborate sets and scenes, which were all stored around the backstage area.

There were 700 to 800 people in the Theatre Royal at the time of the fire, around half of its full capacity, with some 300 people in the gallery alone, which had been boosted by an influx of "half-timers" who entered after 9 pm for a cheaper seat.

=== Fire breaks out ===
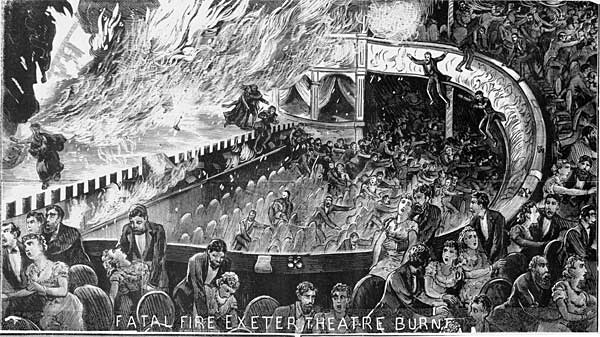
An illustration in Police Illustrated of the Exeter Theatre Royal fire, showing the scene inside in the dress circle

The fire broke out at approximately 10:20 pm during the conclusion of the fourth act, when a gauze curtain was lowered from the gantry by a scene-shifter named Taylor, who then observed that the gauze had caught alight on one of the gas jets used for stage lighting. Upon seeing this, Taylor then ran across the gantry and released the "drop-scene" (a painting of Warwick Castle by Walter Johnson) towards the front of the stage, temporarily isolating the fire from the auditorium, and before the audience had noticed anything wrong.

The drop-scene covered the stage whilst the actor playing the part of Scragger was in the middle of speaking a line, and people in the theatre initially laughed, thinking there was a technical 'first-night' glitch in the performance.

The fire spread rapidly on scenery backstage, with the theatre fireman attempting to use a hose to extinguish it, but with no effect. The escape of the cast and crew meant the stage doors were opened, and this provided a draft that fanned the flames, and caused the drop scene – which had sheltered the audience to that point – to first bulge out, and then ignite.

=== Panic and attempted escape ===
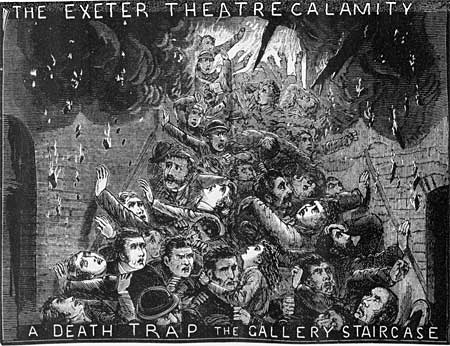
An illustration in Police Illustrated of the Exeter Theatre Royal fire, showing the stairway where many died

The appearance of smoke and flame in the auditorium caused a mass panic, with patrons rushing for the exits. Those in the stalls and dress circle were easily able to escape through several easily accessed, wide exits. The higher upper circle had a wide stone staircase, as well as several secondary staircases, and whilst there were some crush injuries in the panic, most people were able to escape successfully.

Less fortunate were patrons in the pit area, where heavy crushing occurred from the movement of the crowd, and multiple lives were lost. Those trying to exit the pit found that one of their exits was locked and barred, and they were only saved when the hinges of the door gave way from the crushing pressure of the crowd.

Because the fire had been ignited by a gas lamp, the gas valves were shut off, but due to a further design flaw in the building, the shut-off cut the gas to all lighting in the building, including the lighting in the auditorium, and this meant that the audience trying to escape were plunged into darkness, and with the thick smoke visibility was severely restricted.

A number of deaths occurred when attendees from the Upper Circle attempted to descend the stairs they had entered by, but there was no signage or indication of which route was the exit, and they missed the opening for the exit stairs on a landing, and went straight ahead, finding themselves in the restaurant and bar, from which there was no escape.

The majority of the deaths occurred in the gallery, at the top of the theatre, where the single narrow staircase provided a bottleneck, worsened by the presence of a 'check-box' where patrons dropped their passes on the way out, directly at the top of the gallery stairway. In the darkness and smoke, the check-box was knocked down the stairs by the first rush of people, coming to rest at the first right-angle corner on the stairs, where it created a trip hazard, where people then fell over it, blocking the stairway, and causing a backlog of people and a crush as those behind pushed forward to reach the blocked exit.

The wife of the check-box attendant, Lucy Coombes, had come to meet her husband at the end of his shift but had arrived early. She was tripped by the falling checkbox and was trampled by the crowd. She was taken to hospital but died on the day that the inquest verdict was announced.

Some people did try to climb the railing to the upper circle (which the architect suggested as a valid second exit), but no-one is thought to have survived trying to exit in this way, all being overcome by smoke and fumes before successfully completing it.

=== Response to the fire ===
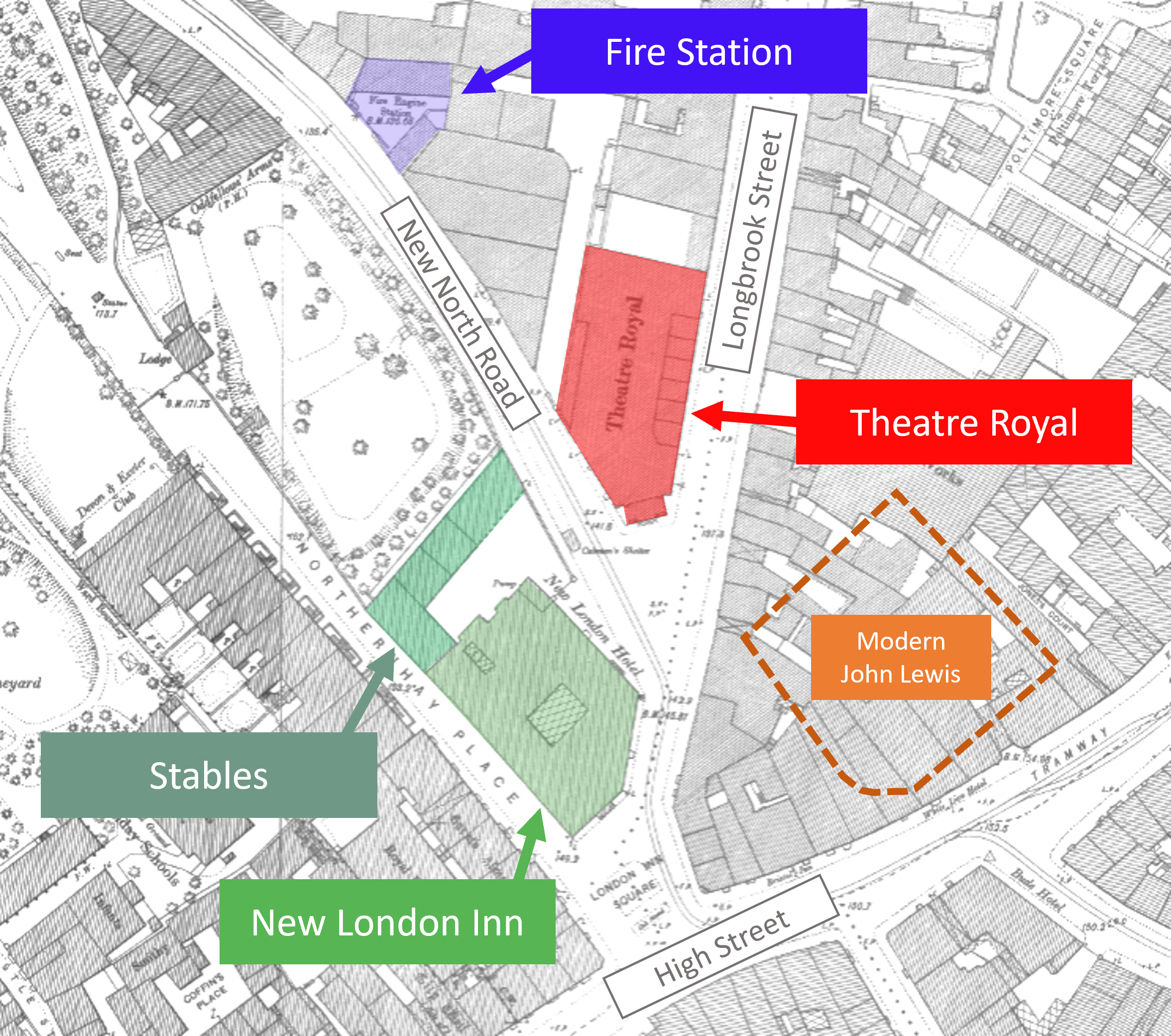
Area map of the Exeter Theatre Royal during the 1887 Fire, showing the theatre, the Inn and its stables, and the fire station. The approximate location of the modern John Lewis building is shown for reference.

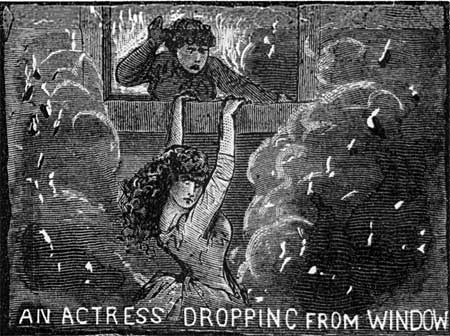
An illustration in Police Illustrated of the Exeter Theatre Royal fire, showing an actress dropping from a window

The fire brigade of the West of England Insurance Co was based only 100 yards (91 m) from the theatre, and Mr R Harry, who worked for the Exeter Tramway Company had left the New North Road depot near the fire station when he saw smoke issuing from the building, and ran back to the fire station to alert them. By chance, Mr Harry had also been the person to raise the alarm when the first Theatre Royal burnt down two years previously. This rapid alert meant that they responded about five minutes after the blaze started with their "Little West" fire engine.

Ladders were brought by members of the public from a local builder's yard, and several people were successfully rescued using the ladders to bring them from the gallery down to the balcony of the upper and dress circles.

After around ten minutes, a rumour circulated in the crowd that everyone was out of the building. The responding firefighters, having managed to get water on the outside of the building now managed to make entry to the building, and only then saw the scale of the disaster. On approaching the gallery stairs, they saw forty to fifty people in a heap on the exit stairs, dead or dying.

Other fire brigades from across the city also attended, including the Army brigade from Higher Barracks, and the railway brigade of the London and South Western Railway. A number of people were on the roof awaiting rescue, but the city's wheeled ladder was delayed in arriving from the Guildhall as it was chained up for security, and the keyholder could not be located for some twenty minutes.

Firefighters from Topsham saw the blaze from 5 miles (8 km) away, and set off to attend, but their horse had been turned out to graze, and could not be caught, and so they set off pulling their engine by hand. The horse was eventually captured, and caught up with the firefighters about halfway on their journey, then being harnessed to the appliance to continue the journey. The Topsham brigade would later receive a commendation from the Home Secretary for their bravery during the response.

The fire was beyond the capability of the firefighters, and they had to retreat from the flames. A group of rescuers, including soldier Driver George Cooper, and sailor Seaman William Hunt, climbed over a small roof and broke a window, pulling several people to safety.

Soldier Bombardier Frank Scattergood rescued a number of people from the building, including a child extra whom he found alone and terrified on the stage, before being overcome by smoke. He suffered severe burns before being pulled out of the building himself, and taken to hospital, where he died a few days later.

A number of people remained trapped on the roof or on the balconies of the building, but the fire's spread overtook many of these before rescuers could reach them, some choosing to jump to the street rather than be reached by the flames.

The last survivor was a woman found crouching in the saloon passage, and pulled out through a window at just after 11 pm.

The landlord of the nearby New London Inn, Robert Pople, responded at the first alarm, bringing five or six ladders which saved many people, and then opened his premises, using the pub to shelter the survivors, and laying out victims in the stables. His actions during the fire were widely reported, including by The Illustrated London News, and he was praised. He was presented with a silver and gold bracelet by the Earl of Portsmouth the following month. This popularity saw him elected Sheriff of Exeter in 1890, followed by Alderman, and later he was elected Mayor of Exeter three times.

The police also attended, with a Constable Ching being noted for making a number of successful rescue efforts into the building with a handkerchief over his mouth.

== Outcome ==
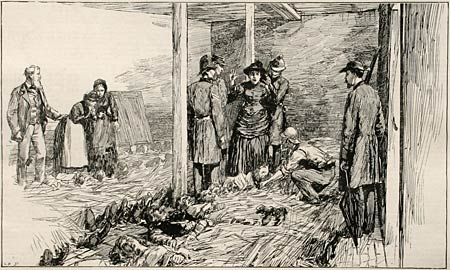
Bodies laid out for identification at the stables of the New London Inn following the fire, published by the Illustrated London News

By the morning following the fire, more than 130 bodies were laid out at the New London Inn. Large local fabric retailer Colsons sent its entire stock of calico to the inn to help wrap the bodies of the dead.

Following recovery, 186 people died during the fire, making this the worst theatre disaster, the worst single-building fire, and third worst fire-related disaster in UK history, behind the Albion Colliery Disaster and the 1212 Great Fire of London.

The dead included at least one baby, 9 months old Willie Davie, found with his father, named Henry Davie (Davey in some references) of Heavitree, as well as thirteen other children aged 16 or under.

Ninety-eight children lost at least one parent in the fire, and thirty-nine were orphaned by the disaster, with more than half being under six years old.

Many bodies were unrecognisable. Whilst some were identified from jewellery or personal effects, a number remained unidentifiable.

== Aftermath ==
Following the fire, on the 8 September, the coroner ordered the ruined theatre to be boarded up, with all persons prohibited, in order that it might be preserved for investigation.

It took some time for the building to be made safe, and for all of the remains to be found and identified. On the 9 September, four days after the fire, the Associated Press reported that the death toll might not exceed 140.

=== Relief fund ===
A local relief fund for the families of victims of the disaster was started very quickly, with donations being managed by a Relief Fund Committee. By the 9 September, only four days after the disaster, the committee had made interim awards to 17 cases who were in immediate need, making weekly instalment payments. In order to care for all of the orphans left by the fire, it was calculated that between ten and twenty thousand pounds would be required, which the committee felt it would be impossible to raise locally.

At the recommendation of the Relief Committee, the Exeter Town Clerk sent letters, including to the Lord Mayor of London, and the appeal went national. Contributions came from across the country, including £100 from Queen Victoria and £100 from actor-manager Henry Irving who was playing at the Royalty Theatre, Glasgow. The Lord Mayor of London collected donations at the Mansion House for the appeal, and this ended up being the largest single donation to the fund at £1,537.

Donations were even received internationally, with subscriptions being received in British Embassies, including in Paris, as well as from Australia, America, and the South African gold fields.

Due to the number of orphans created, serious consideration was given to the founding of an orphanage specifically for those orphaned by the fire, and a sub-committee was created to assess the feasibility. In the end, no orphanage was built, with children sent to orphanages across the country, after visits by the committee to a number of institutions to assess their suitability.

Eventually, the relief fund raised £20,763, which was used for survivors and to support the families of the victims. By 1931, the fund was still providing for five survivors, with £480 still remaining in trust of the fund.

=== Burials ===
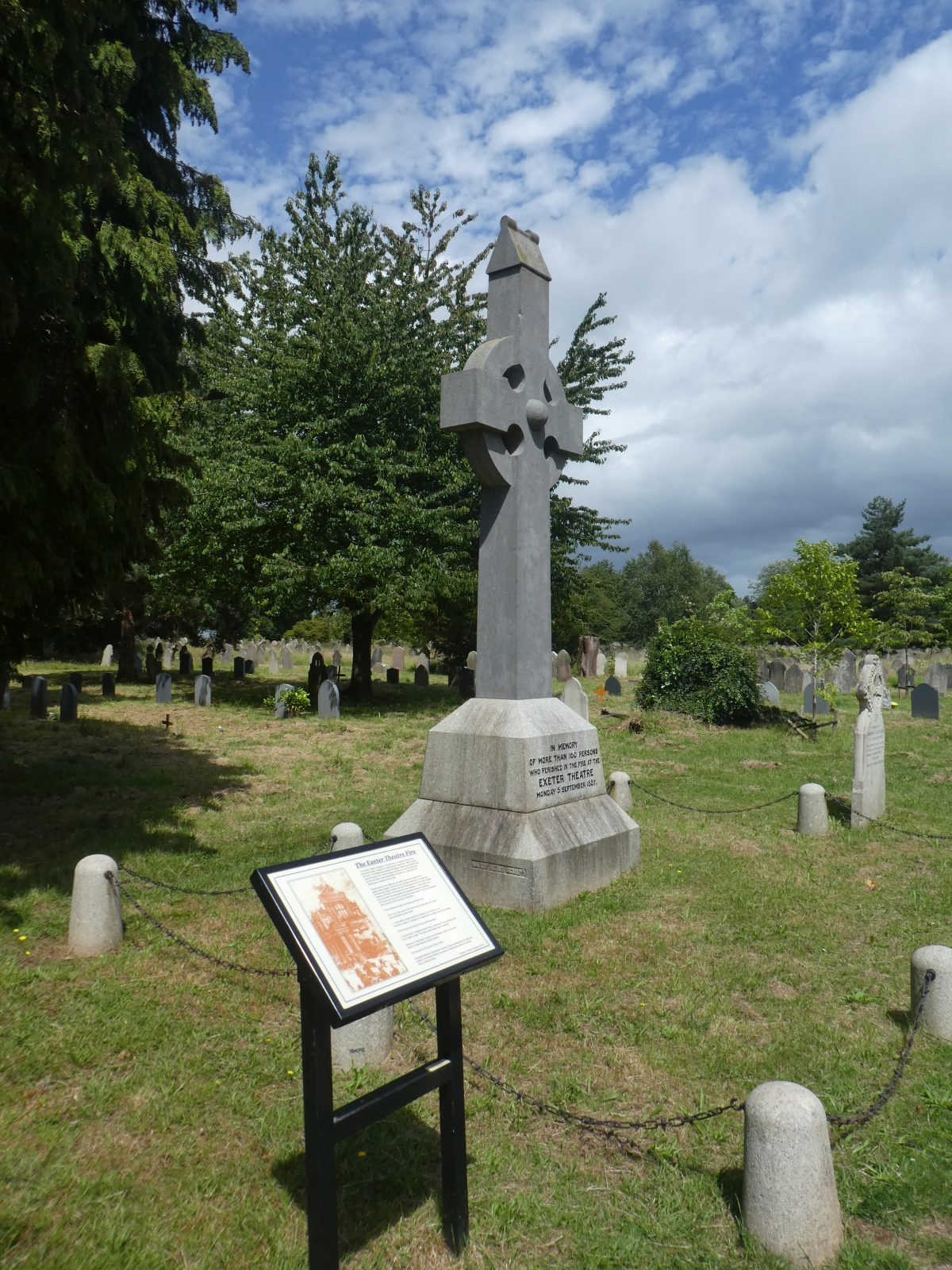
Memorial to the dead of the fire in Higher Cemetery, Heavitree

The funerals of the majority of victims were held within a few days of the fire. 68 of the victims were identifiable, and their bodies released to their families for burial, mostly in the Higher Cemetery, Heavitree. These services continued over the following weeks, often back-to-back at the cemetery, with family, friends, colleagues, and well-wishers attending.

The majority of the dead were interred in the same mass grave, prepared for the purpose at Higher Cemetery, although due to site restrictions, only four coffins could be brought at once. The remains of the 118 people who were not identifiable were interred with their body parts placed in 15 shared coffins. Over 10,000 people attended the cemetery for the funeral service.

Between one and two thousand people attended the cemetery on the first anniversary of the fire, despite there being no formal service or remembrance function.

At the cemetery a memorial to those who died in the fire was erected, made by local sculptor Harry Hems (whose workshop was near the theatre). It was hoped to be completed by the first anniversary, but this was not achieved.

Adjacent to the main memorial is a separate headstone to Bombardier F Scattergood "who striving to save the lives of others, lost his own at the burning of Exeter Theatre".

=== The theatre ===
The theatre was severely damaged, with the stage and auditorium destroyed. A number of parts survived, although smoke and water damaged, including most of the dressing rooms, the foyer, and the upper circle bar. Workmen were employed to move salvageable furniture to a nearby warehouse. The theatre itself was insured by the North British and Mercantile Insurance Company, who paid £5,300 for the losses to the building and shops. The property in the theatre, belonged to operator Sidney Herberte-Basing, and this was not insured, leaving him with considerable debts of over £6,000. This led him to file for bankruptcy in May 1888.

There was debate as to whether the theatre should be rebuilt, or if a new building should be constructed. This was led by Alderman W. Horton Ellis. The decision was made to follow the plans made by actor-manager Henry Irving, who had made a major donation to the relief fund, working with eminent architect Alfred Darbyshire.

This meant following the "Irving Safety Theatre" principles, These principles included making the theatre site isolated, dividing the auditorium from the back of house, a minimum height above street level for any part of the audience, providing two separate exits for every section of the audience, improved stage construction including a smoke flue, and fire-resistant construction throughout.

Electric lighting was installed, with over 510 electric lamps being needed. As the electricity grid was not yet reliable enough in Exeter to ensure the uninterrupted use of the lights, Robert Pople, the owner of the New London Inn who had helped so much on the night of the fire, agreed to the placement of a generator for a number of months in his stable yard.

The new theatre opened on 7 October 1889, with a D'Oyly Carte Opera Company presentation of the Gilbert and Sullivan light opera The Yeomen of the Guard.

=== The production ===
None of the cast members from the touring company were killed in the fire, although company principal Gilbert Elliot was burnt to the face and hands, and they continued their tour, with the next stop at the Portsmouth Theatre (another theatre designed by C. J. Phipps) the following Monday.

All of the scenery for the production was lost in the fire, along with the personal possessions of the company. The performance at Portsmouth used borrowed costumes and scene sets.

Continuing the tour to Portsmouth meant that members of the company who had been summoned to appear at the coroner's inquest did not attend, and the coroner held them in contempt.

== Causes and investigations ==
=== Coroner's inquest ===
A coroner's inquest was opened on 21 September 1887, in front of a coroner's jury.

The official verdict was of 'accidental death' but the licensing magistrates and architect C. J. Phipps were severely criticised for their part in the disaster.

The licensing magistrates were criticised for issuing a licence when requirements from their first inspection had not been met (such as the safety curtain), and because they were aware that there was only a single exit from the gallery. Phipps was also heavily criticised for misleading the magistrates in relation to the lack of a second exit, by suggesting that dropping over the edge of the balcony was a suitable second exit.

Phipps was further criticised for the design, including the roof over the gallery being too low, meaning that people had little chance to escape before smoke overcame them.

=== Independent inquiry ===
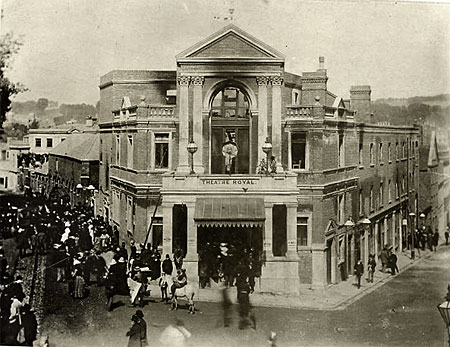
Picture of the Theatre Royal, the morning after the fire

In addition to the coroner's inquest, the government tasked Captain Sir Eyre Shaw, the Chief Officer of the Metropolitan Fire Brigade (since renamed the London Fire Brigade), to conduct a parliamentary inquiry and report back.

Captain Shaw was already a proponent of better fire safety in theatres, having published the work "Fires in Theatres" in 1876, over 10 years before the Exeter fire, and having made repeated steps to improve fire prevention in theatres.

Shaw submitted his report to the government on 29 September 1887, and in it he noted the significant failings of the architect, Phipps. Phipps defended himself from the blame, deflecting to the fact that a number of changes had been made during construction from the designs that he proposed. He also stated to the inquiry that the Metropolitan Board of Works Rules and Regulations were not obligatory outside of London, but Shaw roundly rejected this submission, as the licensing authority had given this as a requirement before construction had started, regardless of it not being otherwise legally required, and that Phipps had given evidence to the magistrates at the licensing hearing that all the regulations had been adhered to, despite this not being the case.

Ultimately, Shaw identified that the substandard design and build of the theatre caused the deaths. There was a large contribution from the architect, but Shaw gave the largest blame to the licensing magistrates, as they had passed Phipps' substandard work as being fit-for-purpose. Shaw noted that the design flaws at the Theatre Royal made this one of the most dangerous theatres in the country:

It may be that, as stated in evidence, that there are elsewhere other theatres as bad as that of Exeter; but it may be confidently asserted that there can be very few worse

— Eyre Shaw, 1888 Parliamentary Inquiry Report

The inquiry report identified twelve serious design and construction defects, any one of which should have prevented the licensing of the building as a theatre:

1. the theatre was not divided, so was a single risk
2. the ceiling of the auditorium was at least 5 feet (1.5 m) too low
3. the stage roof should have been 20 feet (6.1 m) above the centre of the same but was only 7 feet (2.1 m)
4. there was no smoke outlet over the stage
5. there was no smoke outlet over the auditorium
6. the gallery only had one staircase, where there should have been two, and that staircase was obstructed in several places
7. the gas supply for the large auditorium chandelier was the same as that for the stage, and when the stage gas was shut off, this caused the auditorium to go dark
8. there were no masonry-built areas for storage of flammable scenery, which left it around the stage ready to be ignited
9. there was no way of dealing with the fire in the wings of the stage, where fire was most likely
10. passages and corridors which were meant to be of fire resistant materials, were clad with flammable lath and plaster or matchboarding
11. the exit from the stalls and dress boxes as designed was "cramped and tortuous" which had been remedied by an additional emergency exit, but that brought those occupants into conflict with people from the gallery and dress circle
12. the best places for emergency exits on the building had instead been used for street-facing shops

The disaster provided the impetus for new regulation, and new rules were introduced, including making safety curtains mandatory.

=== City council report ===
During the parliamentary inquiry, the Exeter City Council asked Captain Shaw to make recommendations for fire fighting in the city.

Shaw's recommendation was the formation of a city fire brigade for Exeter, and following a conference between Shaw and the Council on 21 September, his formal proposal was put forward on 28 September 1887, recommending the Chief Constable of Exeter Police be put in charge.

On 28 October, the police Chief Constable, Captain Edward Shower presented his list of equipment and staff for the new brigade to the council, but turned down the position of supervising the service.

The council advertised the position, and appointed Mr William Pett of Sevenoaks. By 20 February 1888, interviews had been conducted and equipment procured. Both the West of England Insurance Company and the Sun Insurance companies had donated their fire engines and equipment to the new brigade, and the initial brigade was to be based at the former West of England fire station, close to the ruined theatre. The initial cohort of one sub-engineer, foreman, 16 firemen, 2 messengers and a brigade surgeon were duly appointed to form the Exeter City Fire Brigade, which continued in service until being merged into the Devon Fire Brigade in 1974, and later the Devon and Somerset Fire and Rescue Service in 2007.

=== Attempted prosecutions ===
Charges were filed against both the architect Phipps, and the theatre operator, Sidney Herberte-Basing, by an Edmund Acland Davie (Davies in some sources).

The charge against Phipps was that he had "obtained a licence by fraudulent misrepresentation". Following the laying of the charge, it was found that there was no directly relevant statute under which he could be prosecuted, and a legal opinion was sought from counsel in London, and following this advice, action was discontinued.

Herberte-Basing, who was not present on the night, being at home in Ilfracombe, was ordered to attend court on 18 October to face charges of breaching the magistrates' licensing rules. After some delays due to availability of lawyers, the case was conducted on 17 November in the absence of the defendant, who had already taken up a position at the Alexandra Theatre, Liverpool (on the site of the newer Liverpool Empire Theatre. He was specifically charged that he had breached Rule 1, by permitting obstructions in the staircases and passages of the theatre, Rule 4, by ensuring that gaslights were not properly guarded, and Rule 17, by conducting structural alterations without the leave of the magistrates.

Mr Sparkes, for the defence, contended that the court had no jurisdiction to charge Herberte-Basing, as the relevant statute did not specify any penalties for non-compliance for some of the rule breaches, except for the refusal of a licence. The bench noted the objections, but said that the trial should continue, although on the basis of the breach of Rule 1, rather than the other two rules, as the other prosecutions would succeed or fail on the same basis.

The defence case also noted that Herberte-Basing had not been implicated in either the inquest or the inquiry, and that was unfair for the prosecution, and the "defendant has been chastised with whips" and they should not seek to "chastise him with scorpions".

Ultimately, the court found that the charge had not been sustained, and the case was dismissed, to applause from the court. The remaining two charges were then dismissed.

== Awards and recognition ==
A number of people were recognised for their actions during the fire.

Able Seaman William Hunt, who was at the theatre having been paid off from HMS Express, was praised for making repeated rescues by climbing pillars at the front of the theatre. He received the Bronze Medal of the Royal Humane Society, for putting his own life at risk to save the life of others, as well as the more unusual Silver Medal from the publishers of the magazine Ally Sloper's Half Holiday. He was given special permission by the Admiralty to wear these on his uniform, and at the urging of the Mayor of Exeter, was promoted to Leading Seaman.

Jimmie Lewin was awarded a certificate by the Royal Society for the Protection of Life from Fire for his courageous actions in helping pass both the living and dead through a window to the balcony.

Bombardier F Scattergood of the Royal Horse Artillery made a number of rescues before dying in the fire himself, and a special memorial was erected in the cemetery by his comrades, next to the main memorial cross.

== Legacy ==
The impact on other theatres was almost immediate. His Majesty's Theatre, Aberdeen was due for relicensing at the end of September 1887. Following the fire at Exeter, and the damning inquest and inquiry, Aberdeen magistrates immediately engaged three independent surveyors to inspect the building, and refused to grant a licence until major structural changes were made, in line with the recommendations of Eyre Shaw.

A Bill appeared in parliament in 1885, looking to regulate theatre safety, but it was never passed into law. In the absence of action by the legislature, the fire insurance companies took action of their own, and imposed detailed inspections and surveys on their theatre clients, with huge premiums accompanying non-compliance with the recognised best practice, or even refusing insurance cover. This quickly created change, due to the financial impact on theatre owners and operators.

The Exeter fire was directly referenced in later regulations, including the 'Manual of Safety Requirements in Theatres and other Places of Public Entertainment' published by the Home Office in 1934, which particularly picked up the lack of clear exit signage, the existence of dead ends, and the lack of roof ventilation. This manual included requirements such as the fitting of a safety curtain.

== See also ==
- Crowd collapses and crushes – Type of disaster that occurs due to overcrowding
- Theatre Royal disaster – Crowd crush in Glasgow, 1849
- Victoria Hall disaster – 1883 crowd crush in Sunderland, England
- List of fatal crowd crushes
