= Exeter City Fire Brigade =

Former fire and rescue service in south west England

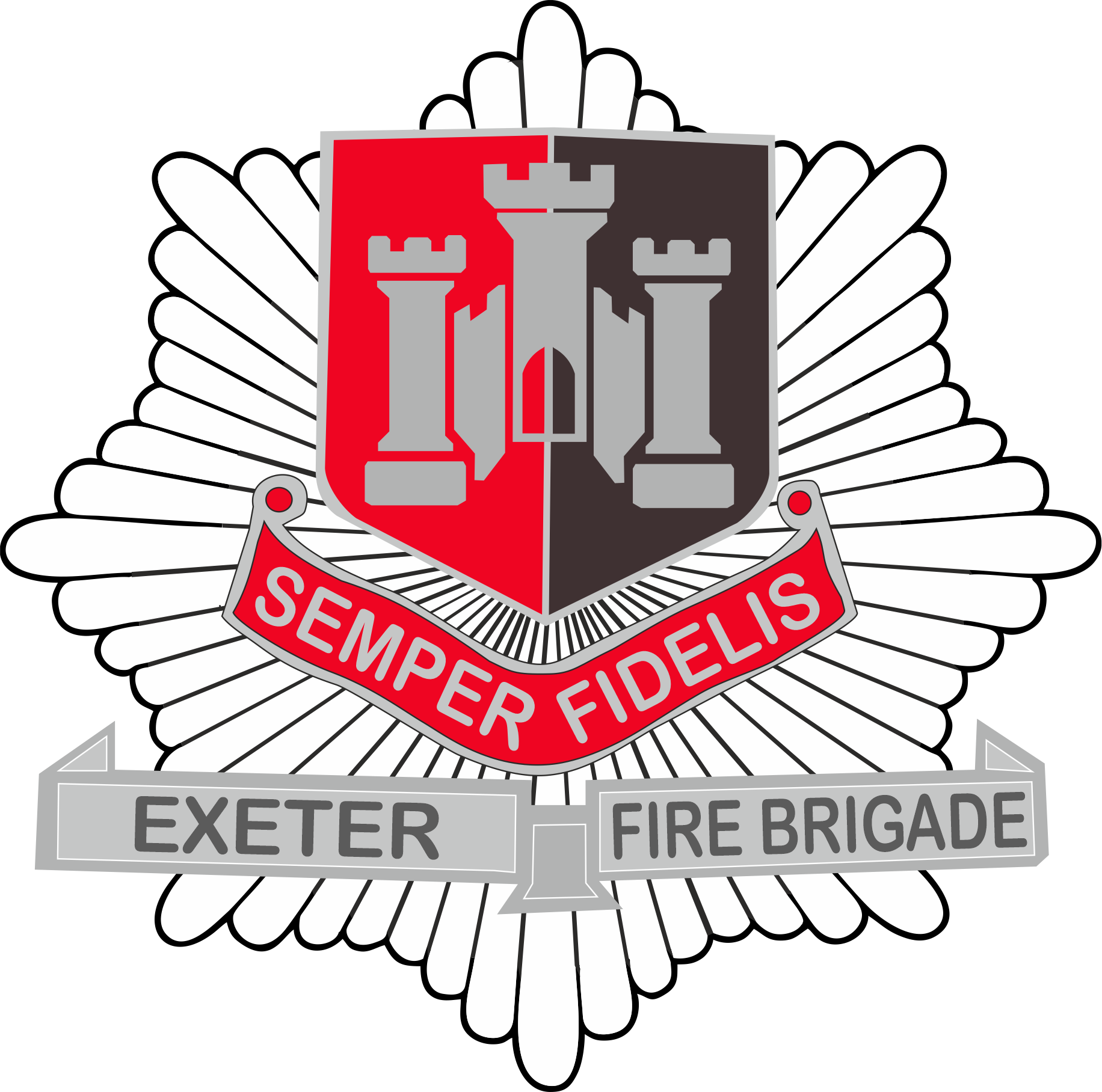
- Cap badge of the Exeter City Fire Brigade

Operational area
- Country: England
- County borough: Exeter

Agency overview
- Established: 1 March 1888
- Dissolved: 1974
- Chief Fire Officer: William Pett (1888–1927); F Richards (1927–1940); HGP Coles (1940–1941); SF Willey (1948–1967); DG Varnfield (1967–1974)
- Motto: Semper Fidelis (Always faithful)

Facilities and equipment
- Stations: 1

The Exeter City Fire Brigade was the first municipal fire brigade in Exeter, Devon, United Kingdom. The brigade was formed in 1888, on the recommendation of Captain Sir Eyre Shaw, the Chief Officer of the Metropolitan Fire Brigade (now renamed the London Fire Brigade), who conducted a parliamentary inquiry into the Exeter Theatre Royal fire during which 186 people died, making it still the worst-ever building fire death toll in the UK.

The brigade continued until merged with the Devon Fire Brigade in 1974, which was itself later merged into the Devon and Somerset Fire and Rescue Service in 2007.

== History ==
=== Exeter Theatre Royal fire ===
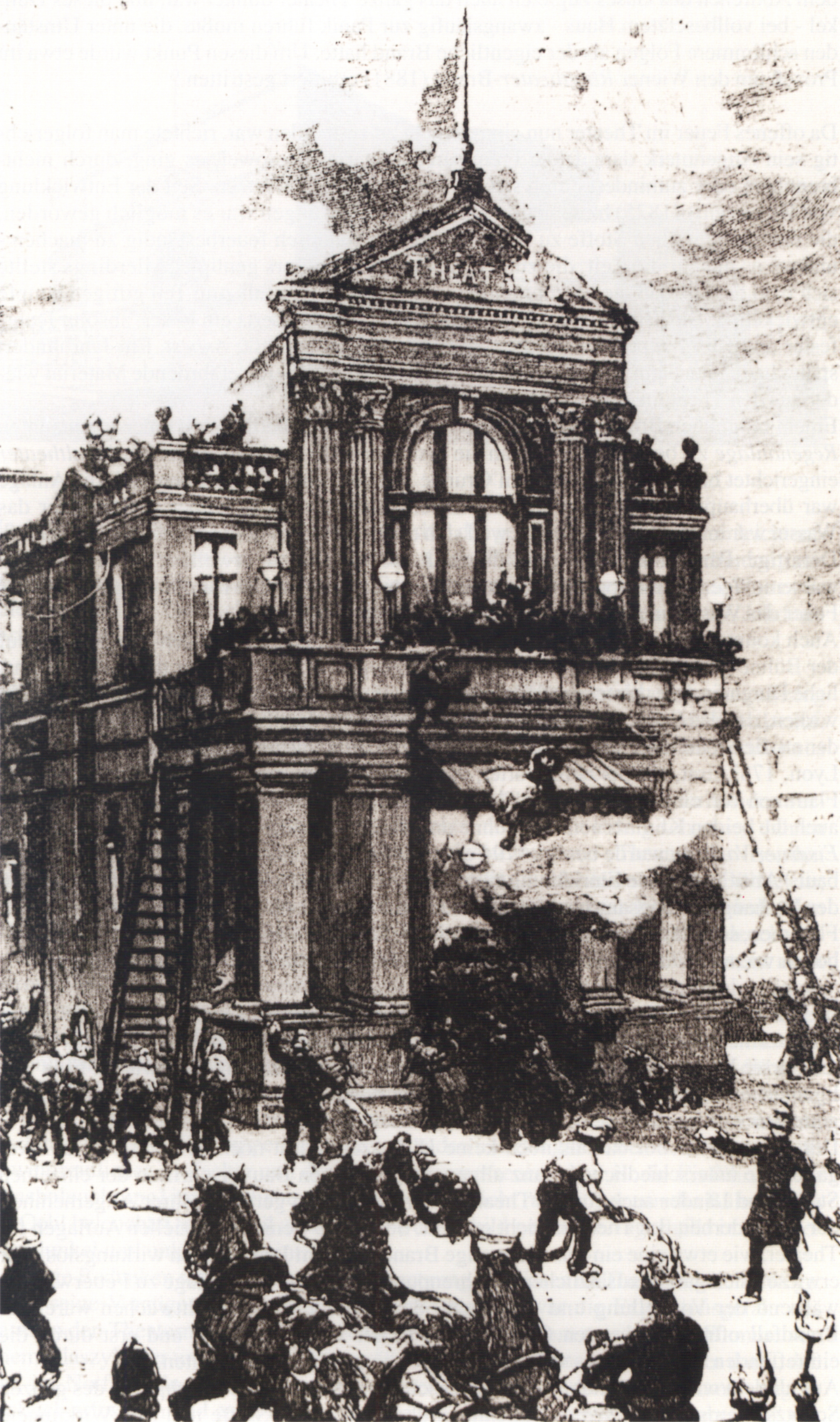
The Exeter Theatre Royal fire, with firefighters from the West of England Insurance brigade trying to fight the fire

On 5 September 1887, a fire broke out at the Theatre Royal, Exeter during a performance. The fire spread quickly, and caused panic and crushing amongst the audience, particularly those in the gallery – the highest level in the theatre – and design shortcomings in the building meant that they did not have sufficient escape routes.

The theatre employed a fireman, who was unable to stop the flames. The fire brigade of the West of England Insurance Co was based only 100 yards (91 m) from the theatre, and they responded about 5 minutes after the blaze started with their "Little West" fire engine, joined by a wheeled ladder from the Guildhall shortly afterwards.

The fire brigade of the West of England Insurance Co was based only 100 yards (91 m) from the theatre, and they responded about 5 minutes after the blaze started with their "Little West" fire engine, joined by a wheeled ladder from the Guildhall shortly afterwards. Unfortunately, despite their efforts, assisted by police and military, they were beaten back by the flames, and were not able to rescue all of the victims before they were reached by the flames and smoke.

=== Formation ===
The government tasked Captain Sir Eyre Shaw, the Chief Officer of the Metropolitan Fire Brigade (now renamed the London Fire Brigade) to conduct a parliamentary inquiry and report back.

Whilst he was completing this work, Exeter City Council asked Captain Shaw to make recommendations for fire fighting in the city.

Shaw's recommendation was the formation of a city fire brigade for Exeter, and following a conference between Shaw and the Council on 21 September, his formal proposal was put forward on 28 September 1887, recommending the Chief Constable of Exeter Police be put in charge.

On 28 October, the police Chief Constable, Captain Edward Shower presented his list of a equipment and staff for the new brigade to the council, but turned down the position of supervising the service. The council advertised the position, and appointed Mr William Pett of Sevenoaks, who had worked his way up from messenger-boy to engineer (senior officer) of the Sevenoaks Fire Brigade.

By 20 February 1888, interviews had been conducted and equipment procured. 42 people had applied to be members of the new fire service, with the council instructing 18 of them to be hired, up from an initial number of 12.

Both the West of England Insurance Company and the other insurance company brigade operating in Exeter, the Sun Insurance company, had donated their fire engines and equipment to the new brigade.

The new brigade took over the West of England Insurance fire station on an initial seven year lease, close to the ruined theatre, on New North Road, a couple of hundred metres from where the John Lewis department store now stands, towards Exeter Prison. The brigade became operational on 1 March 1888. The council significantly refitted the fire station, including fitting it with a telephone connected to the Exeter Guildhall, the messenger's house, and the Exeter water works.

In addition to improvements at the fire station, the council installed 20 fire call points around the city, as well as ensuring that hydrants were provided at key locations.

=== Move to motor vehicles ===
All of the initial capability of the brigade was based on horse-drawn carriages. This did not always make for a fast response. In 1902, the brigade was mobilised to a conflagration in Sidmouth, which the local brigade was unable to control, but due to the limitations of horse-drawn vehicles, did not arrive until 10 and a half hours after they were called.

In 1914, the brigade bought its first petrol-engined vehicle, built by Merryweather and Sons, and named "The Exonia". The new motor engine had its first call out within days of arriving and being christened by the Mayoress. Importantly, the new engine had a top speed of 40 miles per hour (64 km/h) on the flat, and was capable of climbing a 1 in 6 grade, fully loaded.

=== New fire station ===
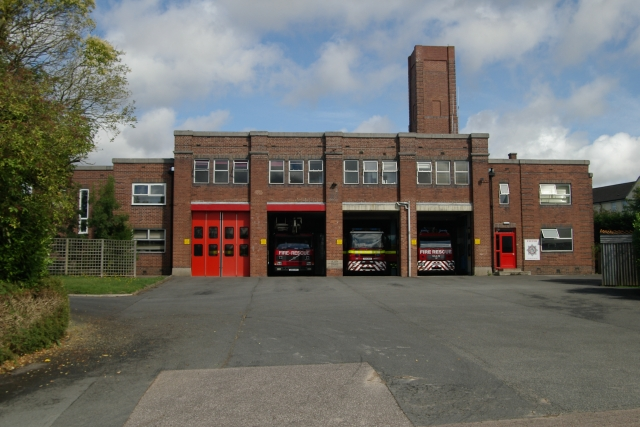
The 1931 Exeter Fire Brigade Station at Howell Road, taken in 2006 prior to demolition in 2008

By 1931, the New North Road site had become far too small for the brigade, with equipment having to be stored at Northernhay, drill being conducted off-site due to lack of space, insufficient space for the chief officer's house, and the on-duty firefighters having to be accommodated off-site, which increased the time to assembling them in an emergency.

At the same time, St John Ambulance were providing the medical service for the borough, and were based from the police station, but with the space used for ambulances earmarked to be used for police motor patrol vehicles. As such, the council agreed to the building of a new combined fire and ambulance station at Danes Castle, adjacent to the city's covered water reservoir.

The foundation stone was laid on 25 November 1931 at the site on Howell Road, by Mayor HW Michelmore on what had been filter beds for the water works. The work was completed by a Wolverhampton contractor, at the cost of £11,894, plus £2,752 for ground works.

The new station opened on 25 July 1932, with accommodation for a permanent staff of eight, and with two modern fire appliances, capable of pumping 50 gallons a minute. A member of the public was struck by a falling hose during the opening ceremony and injured, needing hospital treatment.

=== World war two ===
In preparation for World War Two, Exeter was allocated 10 emergency pumps by the Home Office.

Effective from August 1941, all regional brigades were amalgamated under the National Fire Service, including the Exeter brigade.

During the Blitz large temporary water tanks were placed around the city as firefighting preparation, including the central garden of Southernhay, and the moat of Rougemont Castle.

The most severe firefighting test was on 4 May 1942, when large parts of the city were destroyed, mostly by fire rather than the initial explosions. Firefighting resources were brought to the city from as far away as Reading, with 195 pumps and 1,080 personnel drafted in, and it wasn't until the 7 May that the fires were all under control and the reinforcements could be stood down.

The Exeter Brigade was part of this national service until the Fire Services Act 1947 came into effect in 1948. The number of brigades created by the act was far fewer than had amalgamated, with only one fire service per county or county borough. Exeter was reconstituted as an independent service from Devon, as Exeter was still a county borough.

=== Unrest in the brigade ===
In September 1952 allegations were made of unrest in the brigade, leading to the start of a public inquiry by John Scott Henderson QC. The inquiry was closed after the allegations were withdrawn, but the government then instructed the Chief Inspector of Fire Services to urgently inspect the brigade.

=== Absorption into Devon Fire Brigade ===
County boroughs were abolished by the Local Government Act 1972, and with this, Exeter was merged with Devon Fire Brigade and Plymouth Fire Brigade to form the Devon Fire Brigade in 1973.

A further merger occurred between neighbouring brigades, with Devon joining Somerset in the Devon and Somerset Fire and Rescue Service in 2007.

== Deaths in the line of service ==
Exeter City Fire Brigade lost one firefighter in the course of duty, when during January 1926, Fireman Seage was overcome by fumes whilst fighting a fire at the Exeter Gas, Light and Coke Company's coke dump, which had been burning for several days. The firemen had been working in shifts to stop the fire from spreading, when Seage was found unconscious, and two other firefighters suffered ill effects but recovered.
