= Robert Pople =

English politician (1836–1909)

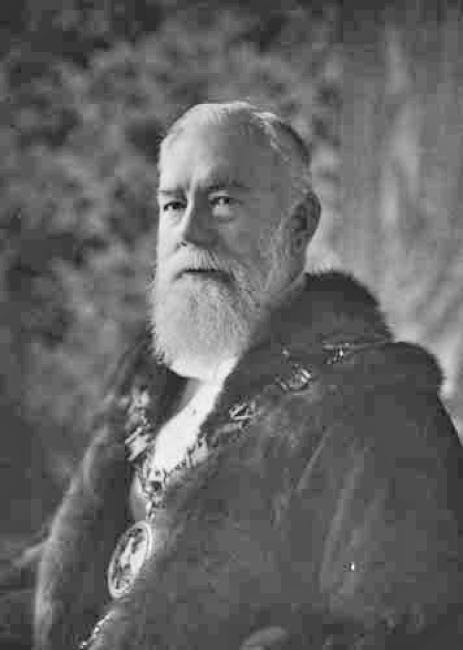
Robert Pople, as Mayor of Exeter

Robert Pople (8 February 1836 – 6 February 1909) was a publican who was three times Mayor of Exeter, Devon.

== Life ==
Pople was born in Somerset on 8 February 1836, and grew up near Bridgwater.

He was a publican, running The Commercial Hotel in Brigwater.

In 1865, Pople and his wife moved to Exeter, to run the Half Moon Hotel. In 1868, they took over the New London Inn (later the new London Hotel), which he ran until his death.

In 1869, he was elected as a Conservative councillor on Exeter City Council, for the St David's ward. It was subsequently discovered that Pople had bribed four people £10 each to vote for him, and he appeared in front of the Election Commission at Bridgwater. Pople admitted the charge, which was part of a wider bribery effort by John Murlis, who bribed around 140 people.

== Exeter theatre fire ==
On 5 September 1887, a fire broke out at the Theatre Royal, opposite Pople's New London Inn.

Pople responded at the first alarm, bringing five or six ladders which saved many people, and then opened his premises, using the pub to shelter the survivors, and laying out victims in the stables.

His actions during the fire were widely reported, including by The Illustrated London News, and he was praised for his actions. He was presented with a silver and gold bracelet by the Earl of Portsmouth the following month for his actions on the night of the fire.

== Popularity and rise to mayor ==
This popularity saw him elected Sheriff of Exeter in 1890, followed by Alderman, and in 1895 he was elected Mayor, being re-elected twice, making him the first holder of the office to have three terms since the 14th century.

Pople was Mayor during the Diamond Jubilee of Queen Victoria, and was awarded the Queen Victoria Diamond Jubilee Medal.

In 1893, Pople was a founding member of the Devon County Athletic Company Ltd which developed the County Ground Stadium on a former wrestling field, and built the first grandstand. This stadium was the home of many sports over the years, including Exeter Chiefs rugby, and Exeter Falcons speedway, prior to its closure in 2006 when the Chiefs moved to Sandy Park.

== Death ==
In 1906, when dining with the Mayor at the Exeter Guildhall, Mr Pople became unwell, and following a bout of bronchitis suffered a series of heart attacks. He did recover, but became noticeably more frail. The death of his wife in the autumn of 1907 had an effect on his outlook.

Pople died of heart failure at his New London Inn.
