= The Romany Rye (play) =

Melodramatic play by George R. Sims

The Romany Rye is a melodramatic play, by George R. Sims, first produced in London in 1882 at the Princess's Theatre, produced by and starring Wilson Barrett. The play was staged following the hugely successful The Lights o' London by the same author and producer. Whilst it failed to gather the same positive critical reception, and did not reach the success of the predecessor, it still ran for 138 performances in London before setting out on a regional tour.

During the opening night of the play at the Theatre Royal, Exeter, scenery caught fire during the performance, causing the Exeter Theatre Royal fire, which remains the deadliest ever building fire and worst theatre disaster in the UK.

== The play ==
The play was written by George R. Sims based on his own novel, Rogues and Vagabonds, in collaboration with Wilson Barrett, who was the producer of the stage production.

The plot revolves around jealousy between two half-brothers, one being half gypsy, and the eponymous "Romany Rye" which is Romani language slang for a gypsy gentleman.

It is staged in five acts.

== Initial staging ==
The show was initially shown at the Princess's Theatre, Oxford Street, London. There was a significant PR campaign in the run-up to the opening night, including enticing real gypsies to the centre of London, who encamped in a park, as well large pictures depicting a midnight murder on the Thames, and a shipwreck.

== Critical reception ==
Critics compared the play unfavorably to The Lights o' London, which was by the same author, producer, company, and at the same theatre immediately before The Romany Rye.

The Critic said that "‘The Romany Rye’ offends against every canon of the stage... there is not a suspicion of humor... Its episodes are vapid and dull.", and drew unfavourable comparisons with the previous production. The Theatre magazine described it as 'showy' but with "little in it worth remembering", and Dramatic Notes said that it was a "sad disappointment". The Times critic said that it was a "bad and mischievous play".

The New York Times noted that the play was polarising critics, due to the "into the gutter" view of the "vulgar and criminal classes", under the review title of 'Successful bad plays'.

Judge magazine had a more favorable review, which noted that the play was "good of its kind", with the kind being "not of a high class".

== Exeter Theatre Royal staging ==
During the opening night performance of the play during its regional tour at the Theatre Royal, Exeter, a gauze curtain was ignited by a gas lamp, causing a fire which quickly spread and caused the Exeter Theatre Royal fire in which 186 people died.

== In popular culture ==
The Romany Rye was a major plot point in the 2005 historic detective novel Dead Fall by Joan Lock, in her Inspector Best series, incorporating elements from the real-world staging and characters.
