= Semper fidelis =

Latin phrase meaning "always faithful"

Semper fidelis (Latin pronunciation: [ˈsɛmpɛr fɪˈdeːlɪs]) is a Latin phrase that means "always faithful" or "always loyal" (Fidelis or Fidelity). It is the motto of the United States Marine Corps, usually shortened to Semper Fi. It is also in use as a motto for towns, families, schools, and other military units.

== History ==
The phrase is believed to have originated from the senators of ancient Rome who declaimed it at the end of their speeches.

The earliest definitively recorded use of semper fidelis is as the motto of the French town of Abbeville since 1369. It has also been used by other towns, and is recorded as the motto of various European families since the 16th century, and possibly since the 13th century or earlier. Records show many families in England, France and Ireland using this motto.

The earliest recorded use of semper fidelis by a military unit is by the Duke of Beaufort's Regiment of Foot, raised in south-western England in 1685. This is apparently linked to its use as a motto by the city of Exeter no later than 1660. Subsequently, a variety of military organizations adopted the motto.

== Families and individuals ==
This phrase was used in Europe, at least in Great Britain, Ireland and France and probably in other countries as well. A more recent adoption is by Senator Joe Doyle, in arms granted by the Chief Herald of Ireland in 1999.

Bernard Burke in 1884 listed many notable families in Great Britain and Ireland using the motto "Semper fidelis" in their coats of arms. They include the following:

- Lynch family (Ireland): "Semper Fidelis" is the family motto of the Lynch family. The Lynches were one of the Tribes of Galway who were fourteen merchant families who dominated the political, commercial, and social life of the city of Galway in western Ireland between the 13th and 16th centuries. Members of the "Tribes" were considered Old English gentry. The Lynches were descended from William Le Petit, who was one of the Norman knights who settled in Ireland following the grant of Ireland as a fiefdom by Pope Adrian IV to King Henry II of England in the early 12th century. "Semper Fidelis" appears on the Lynch Family coat of arms. Although the earliest traceable reference to this usage is James Hardiman's history of Galway published in 1820, the history of the family makes it likely that the motto was in use by the 14th or 15th century.
- Frith family (Ireland): The family of John Frith, Protestant martyr, is thought to have used the motto as far back as the 16th century. John Frith is the earliest entry in Burke's list of the Frith family. The Friths settled in Enniskillen, County Fermanagh, after John Frith's execution. The family fought at the Battle of the Boyne.
- Edge family (England): The Edge family of Strelley, Nottinghamshire, were using the motto "Semper fidelis" by 1814 at the latest (see UK National Archives document reference DD/E/209/32-34). The arms were granted in 1709, but it is not recorded whether the motto formed part of the initial grant.
- Molteno family (South Africa): The Molteno family motto is recorded as "semper fidelis" on versions of their arms held in the archives of the University of Cape Town.
- Onslow family (England): the family of the Earls of Onslow uses the motto "Semper fidelis" (see also Lodge, 1832), though their alternative motto (the punning Festina lente) is better known.
- Stewart family (Scotland; also spelled Steuart, especially in older sources): "Semper Fidelis" is the family motto of the Stewart family of Ballechin in Perthshire. J. Burke (1836, pp. 149–150) records that the family goes back to an illegitimate son of James II of Scotland (1430–1460), and the motto is recorded by Burke and by Robson (1830). However, they do not report the date of its first use.

Burke's full list of families using the motto was Booker, Barbeson, Bonner, Broadmead, Carney, Chesterman, Dick, Dickins, Duffield, Edge, Formby, Frisby, Garrett, Haslett, Hill, Houlton, Kearney, Lynch, Lund, Marriott, Nicholls, Onslow, Pollexfen, Smith, Steele, Steehler, Steuart, Stirling and Wilcoxon. A large portion of these families were Irish or Scottish.

Chassant and Tausin (1878, p. 647) list the following French families as using it: D'Arbaud of Jonques, De Bréonis, Chevalier of Pontis, Du Golinot of Mauny, De Coynart, De Genibrouse of Gastelpers, Macar of the Province of Liege, Milet of Mureau, Navoir of Ponzac, De Piomelles, De Poussois, de Lamarzelle, De Reymons, Henry de Lolière and De Rozerou of Mos.

== Cities ==
=== Abbeville (since 1369) ===
The city of Abbeville in France is recorded by 19th-century sources (such as Chassant and Taussin, 1878) as using the motto "Semper fidelis", and recent sources state that the city was accorded this motto by Charles V, by letters patent of 19 June 1369, issued at Vincennes. This would make it the earliest recorded user of the motto among cities. However, both Louandre (1834, p. 169) and the city's current official website give the motto simply as "Fidelis", and Sanson (1646, p. 15) claimed that even this was not part of Charles's original grant, but was added later, sometime in the 14th to 17th centuries.

=== Lviv (then Lwów) ===
Polish Coat of Arms of Lviv (Lwów), showing the motto, 1936–1939

In 1658, Pope Alexander VII bestowed the heraldic motto "Leopolis semper fidelis" on Lviv (then Lwów, part of the Kingdom of Poland). In 1936, the motto "Semper fidelis" was applied again to the coat of arms of the city (then part of the Second Polish Republic).

Today, in Poland, the motto is referenced mainly in connection with the Polish-Ukrainian War of 1919 following the collapse of Austro-Hungary in the wake of World War I, and more especially in connection with the Polish-Bolshevik War that followed.

=== Exeter (since 1660 or earlier) ===
The City of Exeter, in Devon, England, has used the motto since at least 1660, when it appears in a manuscript of the local chronicler, Richard Izacke. Izacke claimed that the motto was adopted in 1588 to signify the city's loyalty to the English Crown. According to Izacke, it was Queen Elizabeth I who suggested that the city adopt this motto (perhaps in imitation of her own motto, Semper eadem, "Ever the same"); her suggestion is said to have come in a letter to "the Citizens of Exeter," in recognition of their gift of money toward the fleet that had defeated the Spanish Armada. John Hooker's map of Exeter of around 1586 shows the city's coat of arms without the motto, suggesting that the city's use of the motto is no older than this. However, the city archives do not hold any letter relating to the motto, and Grey (2005) argues that the Elizabethan origin of the motto may be no more than a local myth, since it is not recorded in contemporary chronicles, and that it may have been adopted at the Restoration of the Stuart monarchy to compensate for the city's less-than-total loyalty to the crown during the English Civil War.

Various bodies associated with the city of Exeter also use the motto:

- The Royal Navy HMS Exeter, which is named after the City of Exeter.
- Various Exeter-based units of the British Army, see below.
- There is a Masonic Lodge in Exeter, called "Lodge Semper Fidelis."
- Exeter City Police – the motto was inscribed on the force crest.
- Exeter City Fire Brigade featured the motto on their brigade crest
- Some versions of the crest of Exeter City Football Club

=== St. Malo (since 17th century or earlier) ===
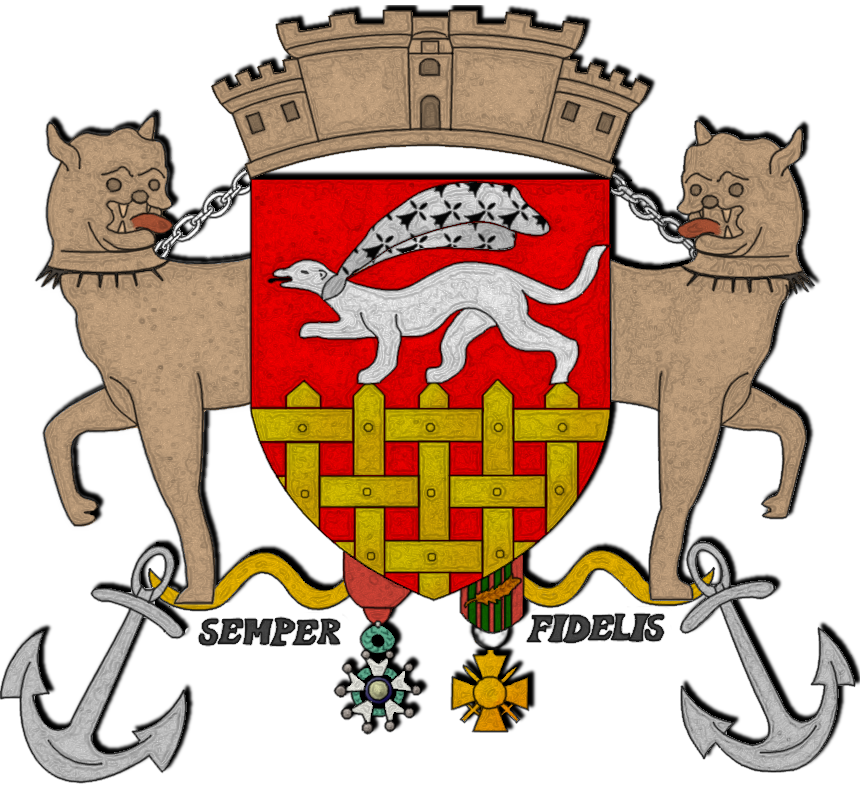
Modern arms of St. Malo, showing the motto

"Semper fidelis" is the motto of the town of St. Malo, in Brittany, France. The date of its adoption is not known, but it appears to have been in use in the 17th century, replacing an earlier motto, "Cave canem".

=== Calvi ===
"Civitas Calvi Semper Fidelis" may have been the motto of the city of Calvi, Balagna, area in Corsica for 500 years.

=== White Plains ===
"Semper Fidelis" is the motto of the city of White Plains, in New York, United States.

== Military units ==
=== Regiments from south-western England (from 1685) ===
The south-western English city of Exeter has used the motto semper fidelis since no later than 1660, inspiring its use by several south-western English military units.

==== Duke of Beaufort's Regiment of Foot (from 1685) ====
In 1685, the motto was used by Duke of Beaufort when The Duke of Beaufort's Regiment of Foot, or Beaufort Musketeers, were raised to defend Bristol against the Duke of Monmouth's rebellion. It was numbered as the 11th Regiment of Foot when the numerical system of regimental designation was adopted in 1751 and was designated the regiment for North Devonshire (later the Devonshire Regiment).

==== The 1st (Exeter and South Devon) Rifle Volunteer Corps (from 1852) ====
The 1st (Exeter and South Devon) Rifle Volunteer Corps, raised in Exeter in 1852, was using the motto on its cap badge by 1860 at the latest; The Illustrated London News reported its use in its 7 January 1860 issue. The motto was continued by The Devonshire Regiment of the British Army.

==== Devonshire and Dorset Regiment (from 1958) ====
The motto was further continued on the badges of the Devonshire and Dorset Regiment when the Devonshires were amalgamated into them in 1958. This use of the motto evidently derives from these regiments' close connection with the city of Exeter, where they had a base from their foundation (see the Illustrated London News article referenced above) until their disappearance by amalgamation into the Rifles in 2007.

=== The Irish Brigade of France (1690–1792) (Semper et ubique Fidelis) ===
The Irish units in France used a similar motto, "Semper et ubique Fidelis", meaning "Always and Everywhere Faithful". These units, forming the Irish Brigade, were raised in 1690–1 under the terms of the Treaty of Limerick, which ended the war between King James II and King William III in Ireland and Britain. As the native Irish army in exile, "Semper et ubique Fidelis" was a reference to their fidelity to the Catholic faith, King James II, and to the king of France. For decades, the Irish Brigade served as an independent army within the French army, remaining "Always and Everywhere Faithful" to their native Gaelic Irish traditions (such as having the men elect their own officers, unheard of in France and England).

Antoine Walsh's regiment of the Irish Brigade is noted for aiding the American cause in the American Revolution, when they were assigned as marines to John Paul Jones's ship, the Bonhomme Richard.

The involvement of Irish Brigade soldiers serving as marines in the American War of Independence may have inspired the eventual adoption of the motto "Semper Fidelis" by the U.S. Marines.

The phrase "Semper Fidelis" was made the official motto of the Marine Corps by Charles Grymes McCawley, the eighth Commandant of the Marine Corps, who was born and raised in Philadelphia, Pennsylvania, which had a large Irish Catholic population. McCawley owed his commission to Senator Pierre Soulé of Louisiana, a Catholic born and raised in France, who would have been well aware of the Irish Brigade's service as Marines during the American Revolution.

=== French 47th Infantry Regiment ===
The French 47th Infantry Regiment used "Semper fidelis" as its motto.

=== Cadet Corps of the Dutch Royal Military Academy (since 1828) ===
"Semper fidelis" is the motto of the cadets corps of the Dutch Royal Military Academy. The corps was founded on 24 November 1828.

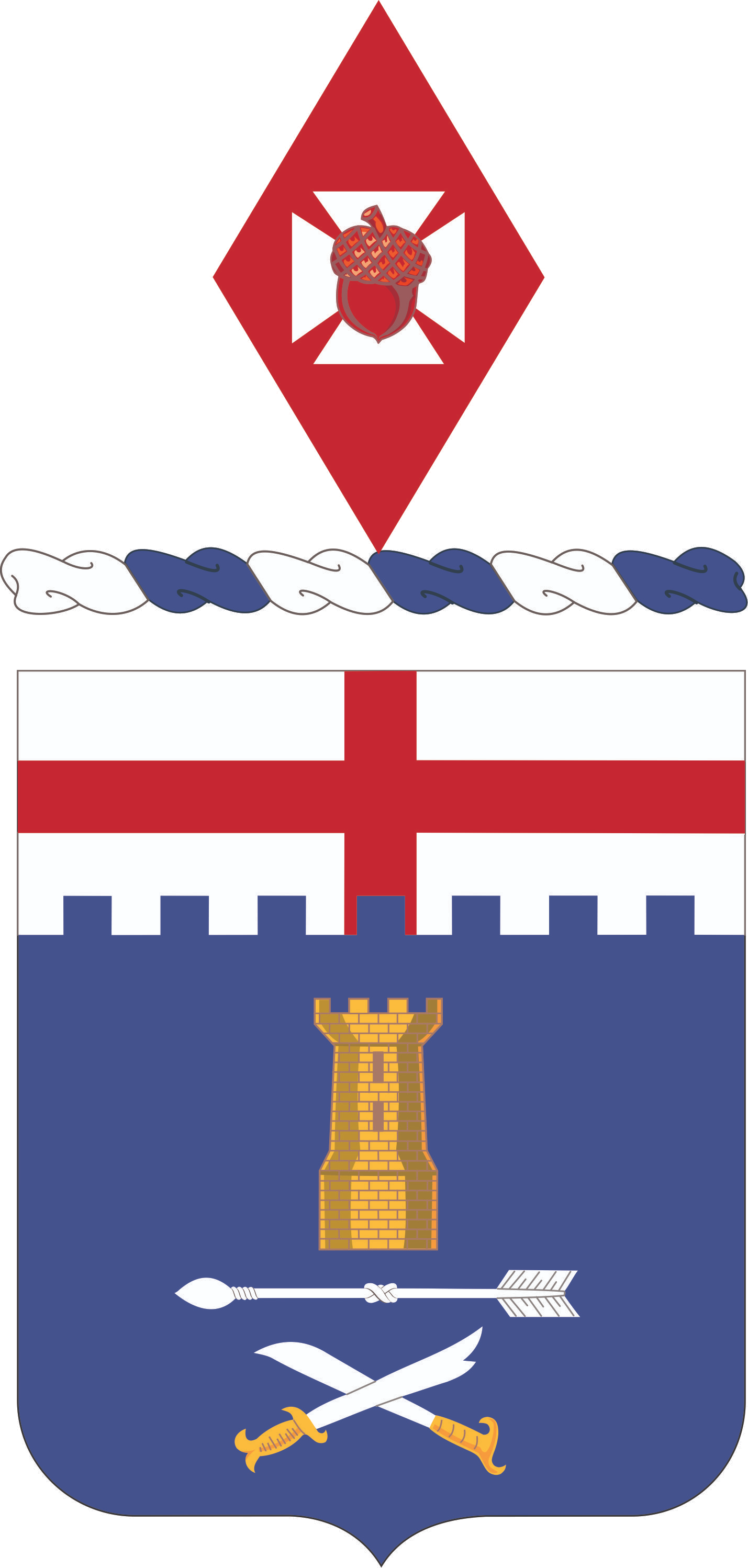
11th Infantry Regiment

=== 11th Infantry Regiment, United States Army (since 1861) ===
"Semper fidelis" is also the motto of the 11th Infantry Regiment, which was founded in May 1861 by President Abraham Lincoln. It served as part of the Army of Ohio and later in the American Indian Wars, Spanish–American War, 1916 Mexican Border war, World War I, World War II, and the Vietnam War. Today, the regiment trains young Army officers at Fort Benning, Georgia.

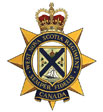
WNSR Crest

=== The West Nova Scotia Regiment (since 1936, inherited from Lunenburg Regiment, 1870) ===
"Semper fidelis" is the motto of The West Nova Scotia Regiment (of the Canadian Armed Forces), formed in 1936. It inherited the motto from The Lunenburg Regiment, formed in 1870.

=== The United States Marine Corps (since 1883) ===
United States Marine Corps Emblem

The United States Marine Corps adopted the motto "Semper Fidelis" in 1883, on the initiative of Colonel Charles McCawley (29 January 1827 – 13 October 1891), the 8th Commandant of the Marine Corps.

There were three mottos prior to "Semper Fidelis" including "Fortitudine" (meaning "with courage"), antedating the War of 1812; "Per Mare, Per Terram" ("by sea, by land"; presumably inherited from the British Royal Marines, who have that as a motto); and, up until 1843, there was also the Marines' Hymn motto "To the Shores of Tripoli". "Semper fidelis" signifies the dedication and loyalty that individual Marines have for "Corps and Country", even after leaving service. Marines frequently shorten the motto to "Semper Fi" /ˌsɛmpər ˈfaɪ/.

Semper Fidelis March
John Philip Sousa's "Semper Fidelis March", performed by the U.S. Marine Band in June 1909.

Semper Fidelis
John Philip Sousa's "Semper Fidelis March", performed by the U.S. Marine Band in 1989.

- "Semper Fidelis" is also the title of the official march of the United States Marine Corps, composed by John Philip Sousa in 1889. Sousa was director of the United States Marine Band (The President's Own) when a replacement for Hail to the Chief was requested, but later rejected. Sousa considered it to be his "most musical" march. It was prominently featured in the film A Few Good Men. Charles Burr wrote the lyrics to the march.
- On the United States Marine Corps Seal, the symbols of the Eagle, Globe, and Anchor emblem holds a ribbon emblazoned "Semper Fidelis".

=== Canadian Forces Base Valcartier (since 1914) ===
"Semper fidelis" is the motto of CFB Valcartier. The base was originally erected as a military camp in August 1914.

=== Italian Carabinieri (similar non-Latin version) (from 1933) ===
An Italian version of Semper fidelis, "Nei secoli fedele", or "Loyal over the centuries", has been the motto of the Italian Carabinieri, granted by king Victor Emmanuel III.

=== Swiss Grenadiers (since 1943) ===
The Swiss Grenadiers, first designated as such in 1943, and since 2004 forming a distinct Command in the Swiss Armed Forces, use the motto "Semper fidelis".

=== Republic of China Marine Corps (similar non-Latin version) (since 1947) ===
A Chinese-language version of Semper fidelis has been the motto of the Republic of China Marine Corps since 1 April 1947. The motto is not in Latin, but it also literally means "loyalty forever"; "永遠忠誠".

=== Romanian Protection and Guard Service (since 1990) ===
"Semper Fidelis" is the motto of the Protection and Guard Service, a Romanian secret service concerned with the national security and personal security of officials in Romania.

=== Hungarian Government Guard (since 1998) ===
"Semper Fidelis" has been the official motto of the Hungarian Government Guard since 28 August 1998.

=== Ukrainian Marine Corps (similar non-Latin version) (from 2007) ===
A Ukrainian version of Semper Fidelis, "Вірний завжди", or "Always Faithful", has been the motto of the Ukrainian Marines for much of its post-Soviet history.

== Schools ==
"Semper Fidelis" serves as the motto of a number of schools around the world:

- Allentown Central Catholic High School in Allentown, Pennsylvania, United States of America
- Bloemhof Girls High in Stellenbosch, South Africa
- Buffalo Seminary, Buffalo, New York
- Cathedral Grammar School, Christchurch, Canterbury, New Zealand
- Eaton International School, Kajang, Selangor, Malaysia
- Emma Willard School, in Troy, New York, United States of America
- Gordon's School, a secondary school in West End, Surrey, England since 1885
- Hagley Roman Catholic High School, an 11–18 school in Hagley, Worcestershire, England
- Immaculate Conception College in Benin City, Edo State, Nigeria, since 1944
- Kapiti College, in Raumati, New Zealand
- Killarney Secondary School, Vancouver, British Columbia, Canada
- Meriden School in Strathfield, of Sydney, Australia
- Mount Carmel Roman Catholic High School, Accrington, Lancashire, England
- Sacred Heart College, Kyneton of Victoria, Australia
- St. Anne's Catholic School, an 11–18 girls school in Southampton, England
- St. Joseph's College, Bandarawela, Uva province, Sri Lanka, since 1909
- St Mary's Catholic Academy in Blackpool, England
- Vancouver College, Vancouver, British Columbia, Canada
- Wynnum State High School, Brisbane, Queensland, Australia

== Variants ==
B. Burke (1884) and Chassant & Tausin (1878), and other sources, list a number of similar mottos that appeared in family or city coats of arms in Great Britain, Ireland and France, though none was ever as popular as "Semper fidelis". They include the following:

- Semper constans et fidelis ("Always constant and faithful"; Irton, Lynch, Mellor and Spoor families)
- Semper fidelis esto ("Be always faithful"; Steele family, Henry de Lolière family Auvergne Nobili Tome III)
- Semper et ubique fidelis ("Always and everywhere faithful"; De Burgh family, presently used by Gonzaga College, Dublin)
- Semper fidelis et audax ("Always faithful and brave"; Moore and O'More families)
- Semper fidelis, mutare sperno ("Always faithful, I scorn to change"; City of Worcester)
- Semper Fidus ("Always faithful")
- Semper Roy ("Always Roy") – presently used by the Delhi Expat Cricket Team (The Viceroys)

== See also ==
- Honneur et Fidélité
- Meine Ehre heißt Treue

== Sources ==
- Grey, T. (2005). The Chronicle of Exeter. Exeter: The Mint Press. ISBN 1-903356-42-3
- Lethbridge, Tony (2005). Exeter: a history and guide (Stroud, Gloucestershire: Tempus Publishing), ISBN 0-7524-3515-9
