= Higher Barracks, Exeter =

Higher Barracks
- Exeter
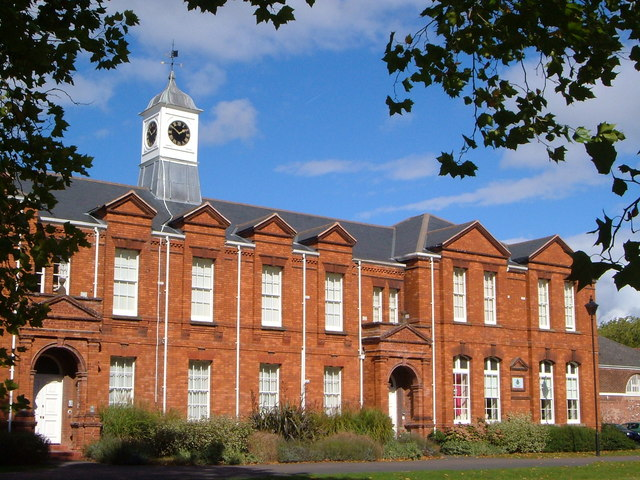
- Higher Barracks

Site information
- Type: Barracks
- Owner: Ministry of Defence
- Operator: British Army

Location
- Location within Devon
- Coordinates: 50.73143°N 3.52997°W

Site history
- Built: 1794
- Built for: War Office
- In use: 1794-1997

Garrison information
- Occupants: Royal Army Pay Corps

Higher Barracks is a former military installation on Howell Road, Exeter.

== History ==
The barracks were built as part of the British response to the threat of the French Revolution and were completed in 1794. During the First World War the barracks served as a military hospital and during the Second World War they became the base for the United States 500th Medical Collecting Company preparing for the Normandy landings. From April 1980 until February 1988, the Barracks was used by Exeter University Officer Training Corps, which was initially attached to 1st Battalion, The Wessex Regiment. Exeter UOTC moved to Wyvern Barracks in February 1988. The Royal Army Pay Corps moved into the barracks in 1987. The Corps remained there until they were amalgamated with our units to form the Adjutant General's Corps and the barracks closed in 1997. The site was redeveloped for housing by Barratt Developments in 1998.
