= Devon and Somerset Fire and Rescue Service =

Fire and rescue service in south west England

Operational area
- Country: England
- Counties: Devon
- Unitary authorities: Plymouth; Somerset; Torbay

Agency overview
- Established: 1 April 2007
- Employees: 1,850
- Chief Fire Officer: Gavin Ellis

Facilities and equipment
- Stations: 83
- Engines: 121

Website
- www.dsfire.gov.uk

Devon and Somerset Fire and Rescue Service (DSFRS) is the statutory fire and rescue service covering the counties Devon and Somerset in South West England – an area of 3,924 square miles (10,160 km^{2}). It serves a population of 1.75 million, and is the fifth largest fire and rescue service in the United Kingdom.

Devon & Somerset Fire & Rescue Service was founded on 1 April 2007, following the merger of Devon Fire and Rescue Service with Somerset Fire and Rescue Service. The Somerset service, previously known as Somerset Fire Brigade, was formed on 1 April 1948. Devon Fire Brigade was formed in 1973, by the amalgamation of Exeter City Fire Brigade, Plymouth City Brigade and Devon County Brigade. It became Devon Fire and Rescue Service in 1987.

The main headquarters is located at Clyst St George near Exeter. Its main training centre is the Service Training Centre (STC) at Plympton fire station. It employs approximately 1,850 staff, including 578 wholetime firefighters and 36 control room staff, 930 retained firefighters and 300 non-uniformed staff.

Each county operated its own control room until 2012, but they now have a single control room at the main headquarters.

== Fire stations ==
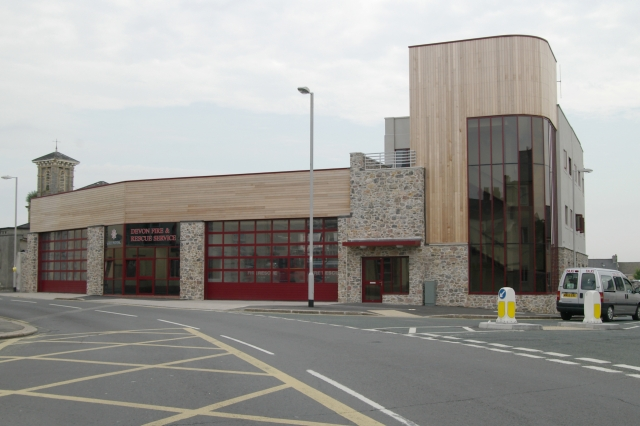
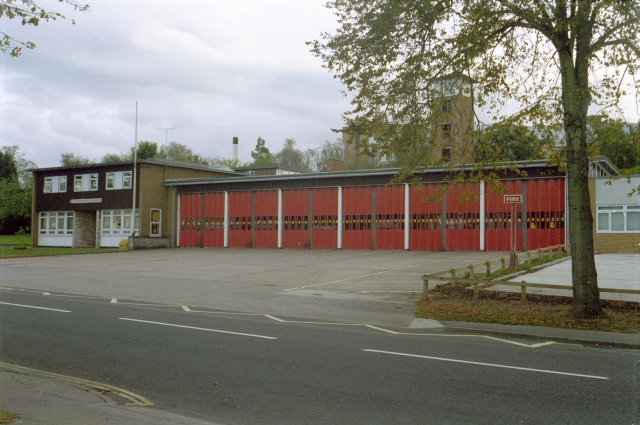
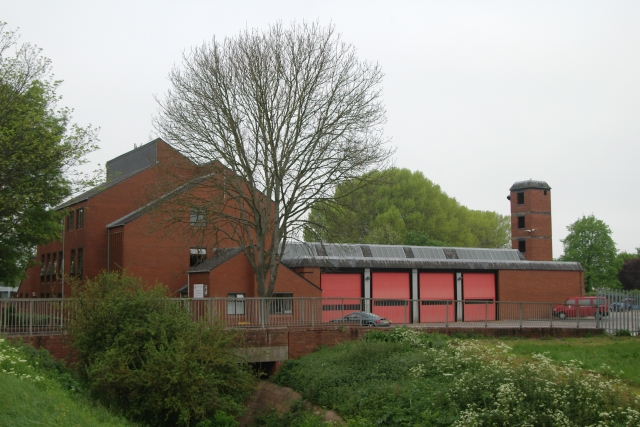
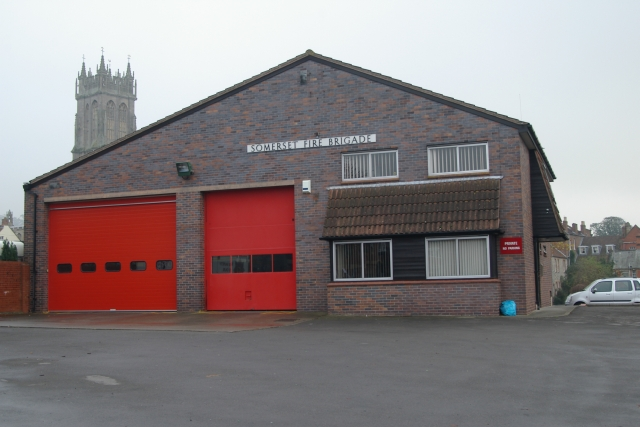
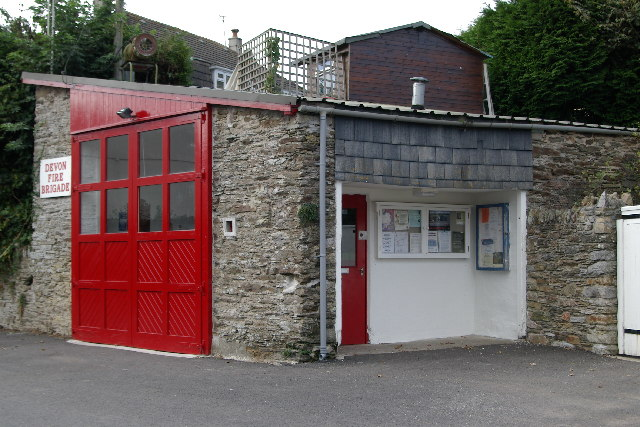
Clockwise from top left: Some of the service's fire stations in Plymouth, Torquay, Kingston, Glastonbury and Taunton

The fire service operates 83 fire stations and 121 fire engines, the second largest number of fire stations in the country. The fire stations organised across six geographical groups – Barnstaple, Exeter, Plymouth, Taunton, Torquay and Yeovil. The fire stations are crewed on a mix of wholetime, wholetime and retained, and retained duty systems.

Nineteen DSFRS fire stations are home to fire service co-responders. Devon and Somerset Fire and Rescue Service works in partnership with South Western Ambulance Service to provide emergency medical cover to areas of Devon and Somerset. These are areas that have been identified as having a greater need for ambulance cover. The aim of a co-responder team is to preserve life until the arrival of either a rapid response vehicle (RRV) or an ambulance. Co-responder vehicles are equipped with oxygen and automatic external defibrillation (AED) equipment. Co-responder stations have a dedicated vehicle for co-responder calls. The vehicle, known as the emergency response unit (EMS), attends in place of the fire appliance (providing there are enough crew members still on duty), allowing the fire appliance to remain available.

== Fire appliances ==
Devon and Somerset use a variety of front-line and special appliances. Operating from 83 fire stations, it has 121 fire engines and 64 special appliances, including aerial appliances, water/foam carriers, incident command units, 4x4s and environmental protection units.

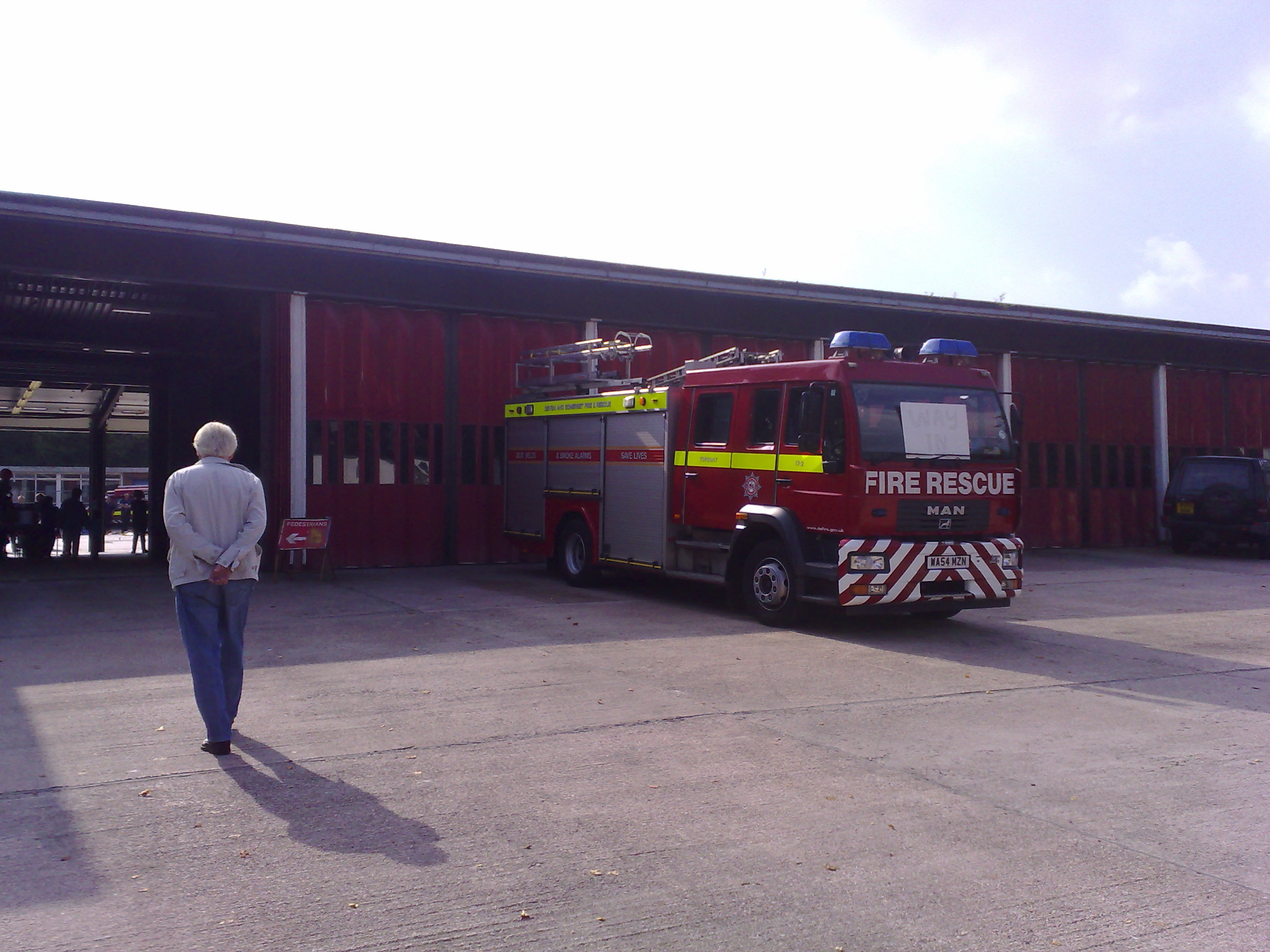
Water tender

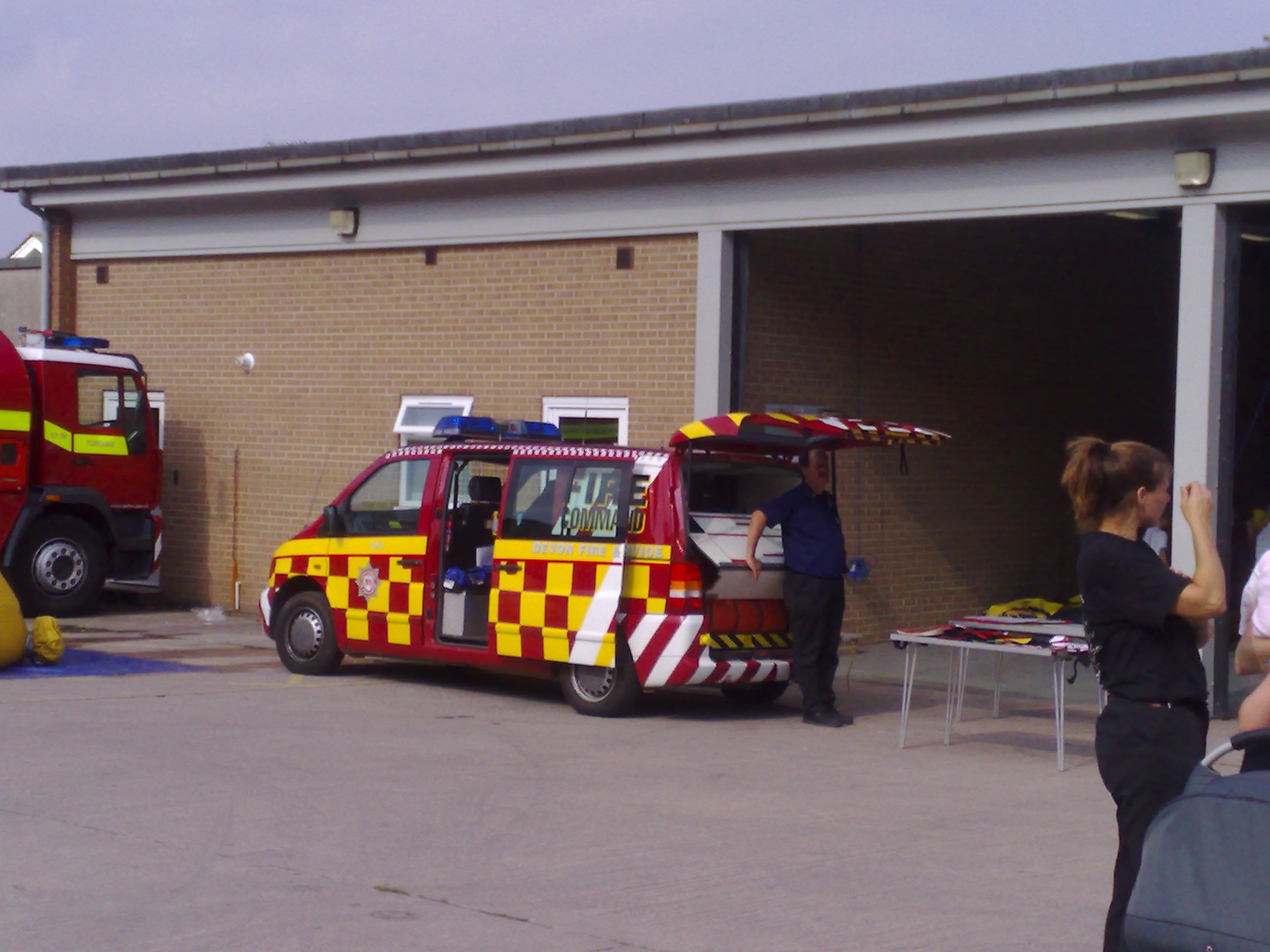
Incident command vehicle

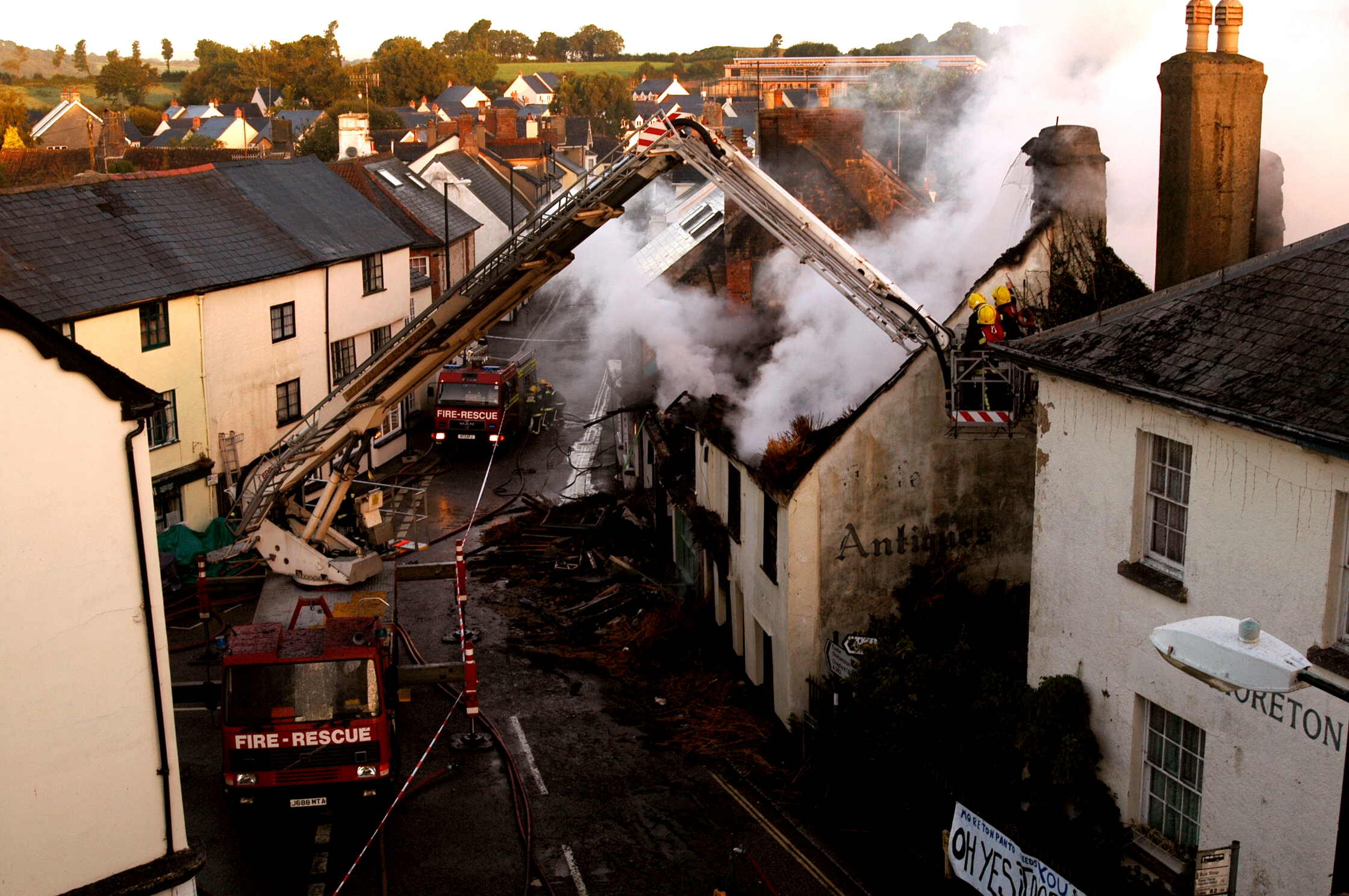
Aerial ladder platform at work

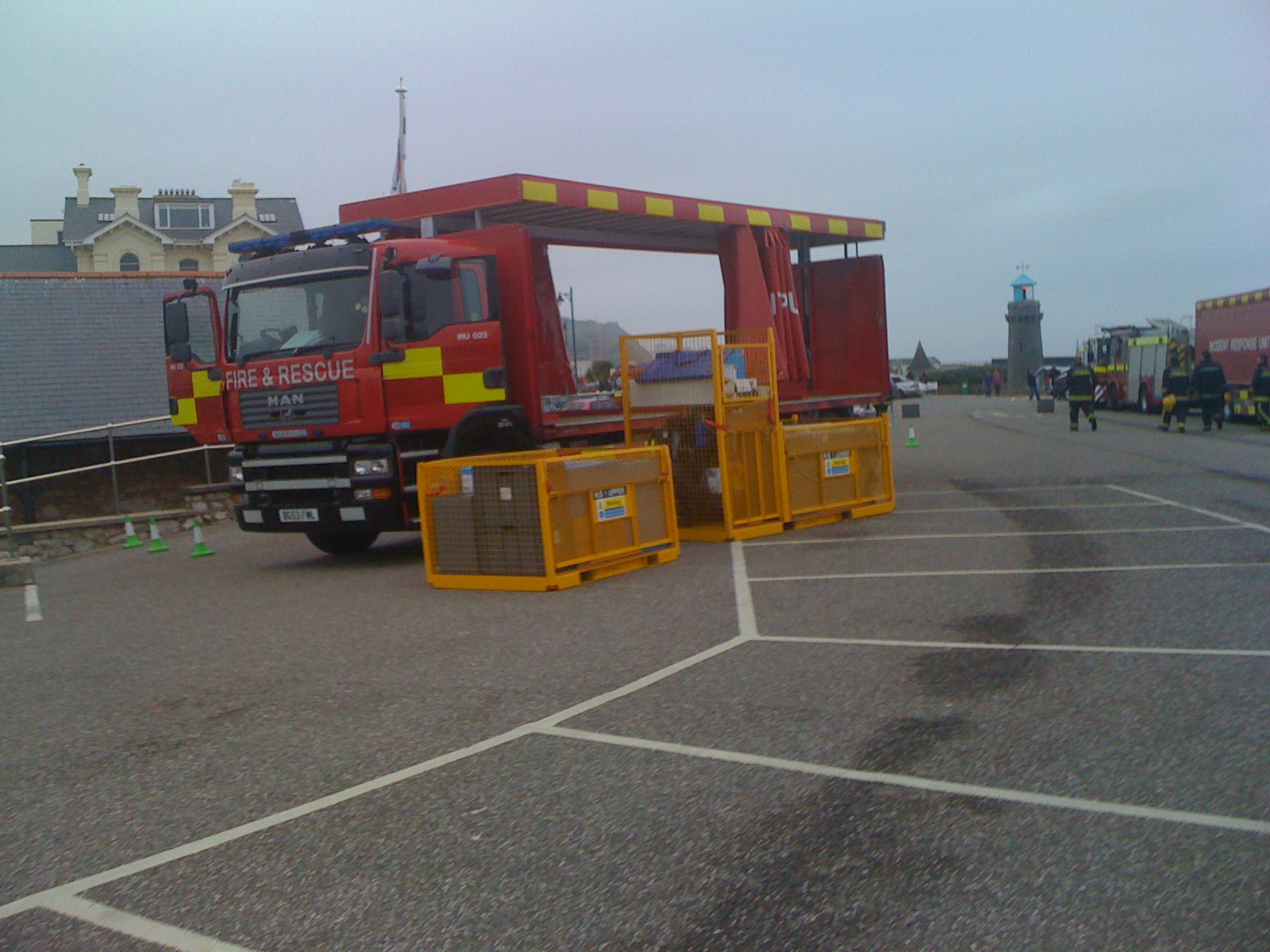
Incident response unit

=== British Red Cross Fire and Emergency Support Service ===
The British Red Cross Fire and Emergency Support Service (FESS) helps to meet the needs of individuals who have suffered damage to their homes following a domestic property fire, flood or similar emergency. Two units operating in Devon and Somerset based at the based Plymouth Red Cross Centre and Bridgwater Fire Station are dedicated volunteers. Their role includes providing refreshments, clothing, toiletries, use of an onboard telephone, first aid, sign-posting to other organisations, support with the care of children and pets, assistance in securing temporary accommodation, transport to friends/family, and use of shower/washing and toilet facilities.

== Operations ==
As part of the national FiReControl project, Devon and Somerset Fire and Rescue's control rooms were due to switch over to a regional control centre in Taunton. Both control rooms were planned to cutover in May 2011, but the plan was formally scrapped in December 2010 by the Government.

At the start of the COVID-19 pandemic in 2020, DSFRS firefighters were trained to drive ambulances for South Western Ambulance Service as a relief measure should any ambulance staff fall sick to COVID-19. As of June 2020, they had attended 1,700 incidents.

== Performance ==
Every fire and rescue service in England and Wales is periodically subjected to a statutory inspection by His Majesty's Inspectorate of Constabulary and Fire & Rescue Services (HMICFRS). The inspections investigate how well the service performs in each of three areas. On a scale of outstanding, good, requires improvement and inadequate, Devon and Cornwall Fire and Rescue Service was rated as follows:

HMICFRS Inspection Devon and Cornwall
Area	Rating 2018/19	Rating 2021/22	Description
Effectiveness	Good	Good	How effective is the fire and rescue service at keeping people safe and secure from fire and other risks?
Efficiency	Requires Improvement	Good	How efficient is the fire and rescue service at keeping people safe and secure from fire and other risks?
People	Requires Improvement	Requires Improvement	How well does the fire and rescue service look after its people?

== Mutual assistance ==
The Fire and Rescue Services Act 2004 gives fire services the power to assist other fire services or fire authorities in what is known as mutual assistance.

The fire services that adjoin the Devon and Somerset Fire and Rescue Service are:

- Cornwall Fire and Rescue Service
- Dorset & Wiltshire Fire and Rescue Service
- Avon Fire and Rescue Service
- Exeter International Airport Fire and Rescue Service

== Children and young people ==
Devon and Somerset Fire and Rescue Service has a number of schemes for young people.

Fire Cadets is a programme open to young people between the ages of 12 and 16. Every week up to 14 Cadets attend their local fire station for two hours to take part in firefighter activities such as hose running, ladder climbs (SHACS), and search and rescue. The programme is currently only running from limited stations within Devon and Somerset. These are Exmouth, Frome, Ilfracombe, Plymouth, Tiverton and Wincanton.

Firebreak is a personal development scheme for Key Stage 4 pupils (ages 14–16). It provides a novel fire and rescue service themed educational diet designed to complement and enhance the school curriculum.

The Firesetter Intervention programme is designed to address firesetting behaviour amongst children and young people up to the age of 19.

Phoenix is a six-month programme, primarily designed to reduce fire risk and fire related crime within local communities by working with 'at-risk' young people between the ages of 15 and 18.

== See also ==
- Fire service in the United Kingdom
- List of British firefighters killed in the line of duty

=== Other local emergency services ===
- Avon and Somerset Police
- Devon Air Ambulance
- Dorset and Somerset Air Ambulance
- Devon and Cornwall Police
- South Western Ambulance Service
- Royal National Lifeboat Institution
