= Theatre Royal, Exeter =

Theatres in Exeter, Devon, England

Coordinates: 50.7264°N 3.5274°W

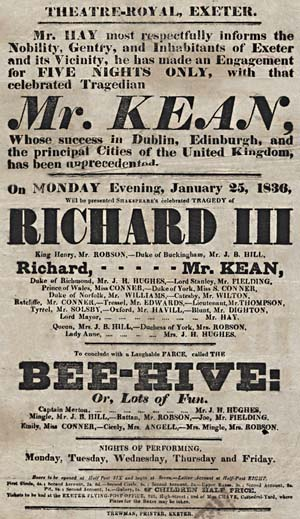
A Theatre Royal Exeter playbill from 1836, featuring Charles Kean in a performance of Richard III

The Theatre Royal, Exeter was the name of several theatres situated in the city centre of Exeter, Devon, England in the United Kingdom.

== Early theatres and fires ==
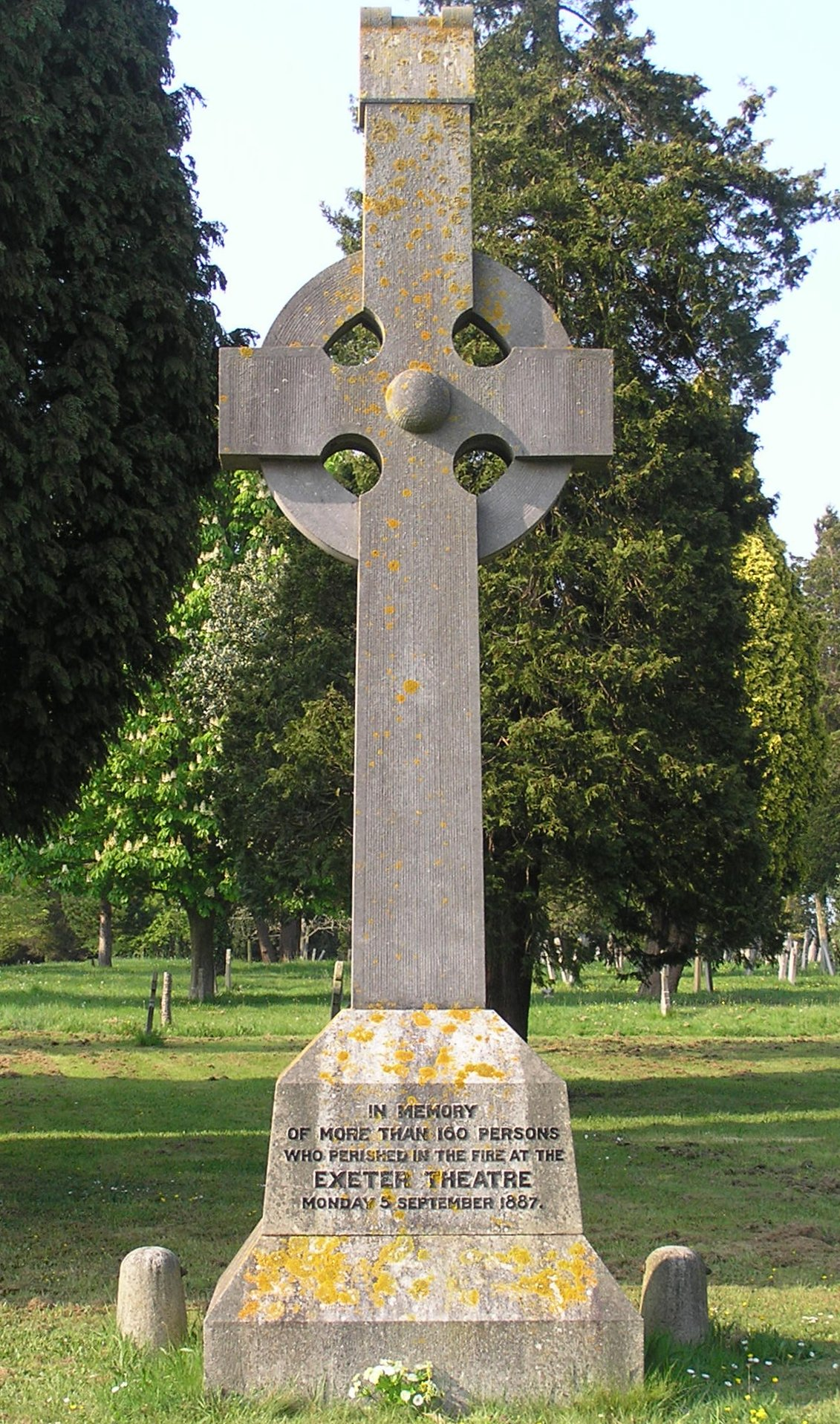
The memorial to those who died in the fire

The name "Theatre Royal" was first applied in Exeter by the mid-1830s to what had previously been the Bedford Circus Theatre, in premises dating from 1821. This theatre building was a replacement for one of 1787 which had burnt down the previous year.

This building was completely gutted by fire in 1885. Although it was reconstructed for other purposes, the name "Theatre Royal" was transferred to new premises on the corner of Longbrook Street and New North Road. The new theatre was built by the Exeter Theatre Company to the designs of C. J. Phipps and opened in 1886.

== Fire disaster ==
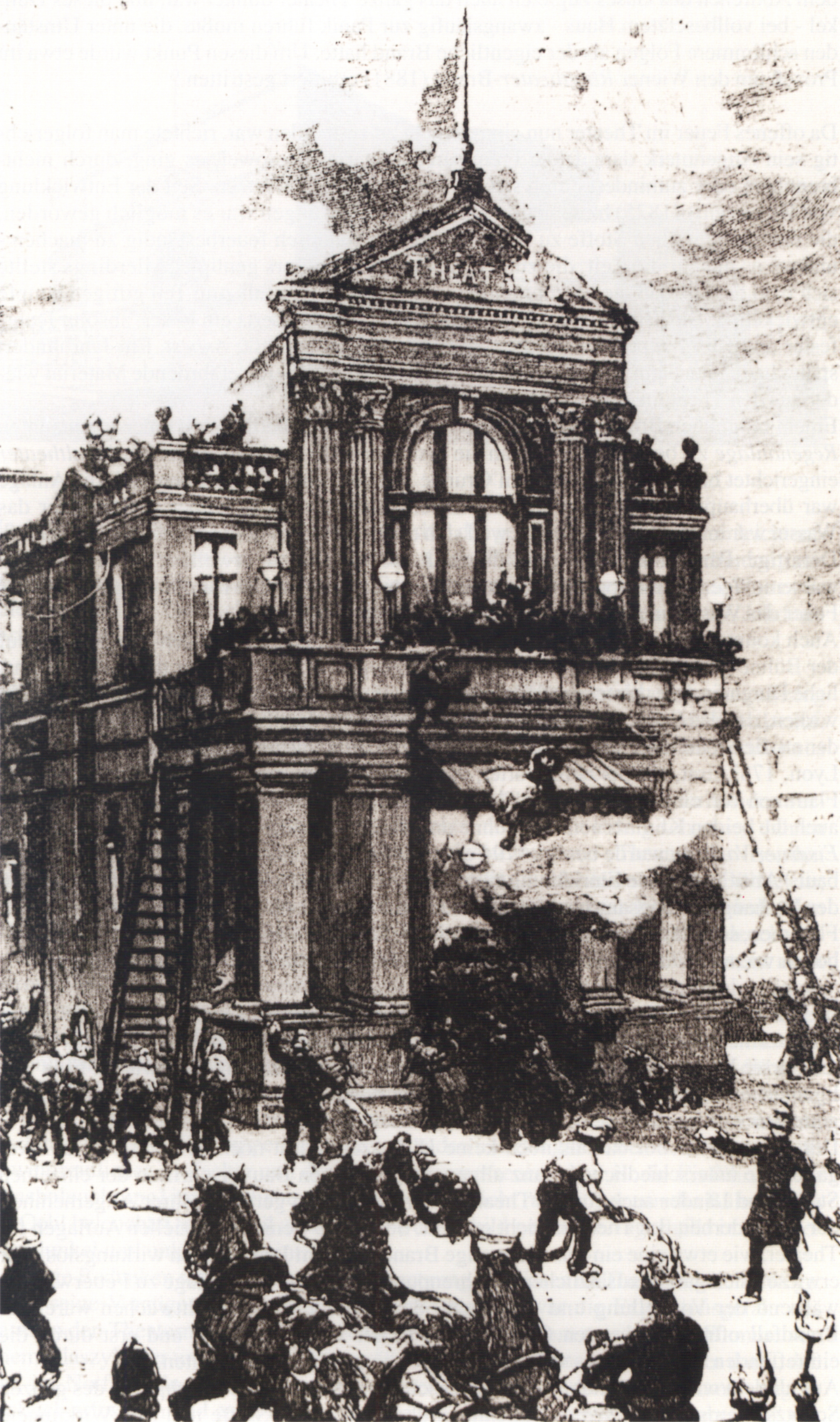
The fire of 1887

The theatre is best remembered for the disaster during a dramatisation of Romany Rye (a melodrama by Wilson Barrett) on 5 September 1887, which became the worst theatre fire in British history. Fire broke out backstage where gas lighting ignited some gauze. The number of exits from the gallery of the auditorium proved to be inadequate and in the resultant panic amongst the audience 186 people died. A national appeal for donations for the victims’ families raised £20,763 and the event was influential in the introduction of safety precautions for public buildings. There is a memorial to those who died in the fire in Higher Cemetery, Heavitree, made by local sculptor Harry Hems.

== The last theatre ==
The Theatre Royal was rebuilt, opening in 1889 with a performance of The Yeomen of the Guard by the D'Oyly Carte Opera Company. The new building had lighting by electricity and a safety curtain.

During its lifetime the theatre presented melodrama, musical theatre, music hall and ballet as well as drama. Every Christmas of its 20th century existence saw a pantomime. For a period in the 1950s it showed CinemaScope films.

The Theatre Royal was closed in 1962 and demolished to be replaced by an office block. Although attempts to save it were unsuccessful, they did lead to creation of the Northcott Theatre.
