= Exeter Guildhall =

Municipal building in Exeter, Devon, England

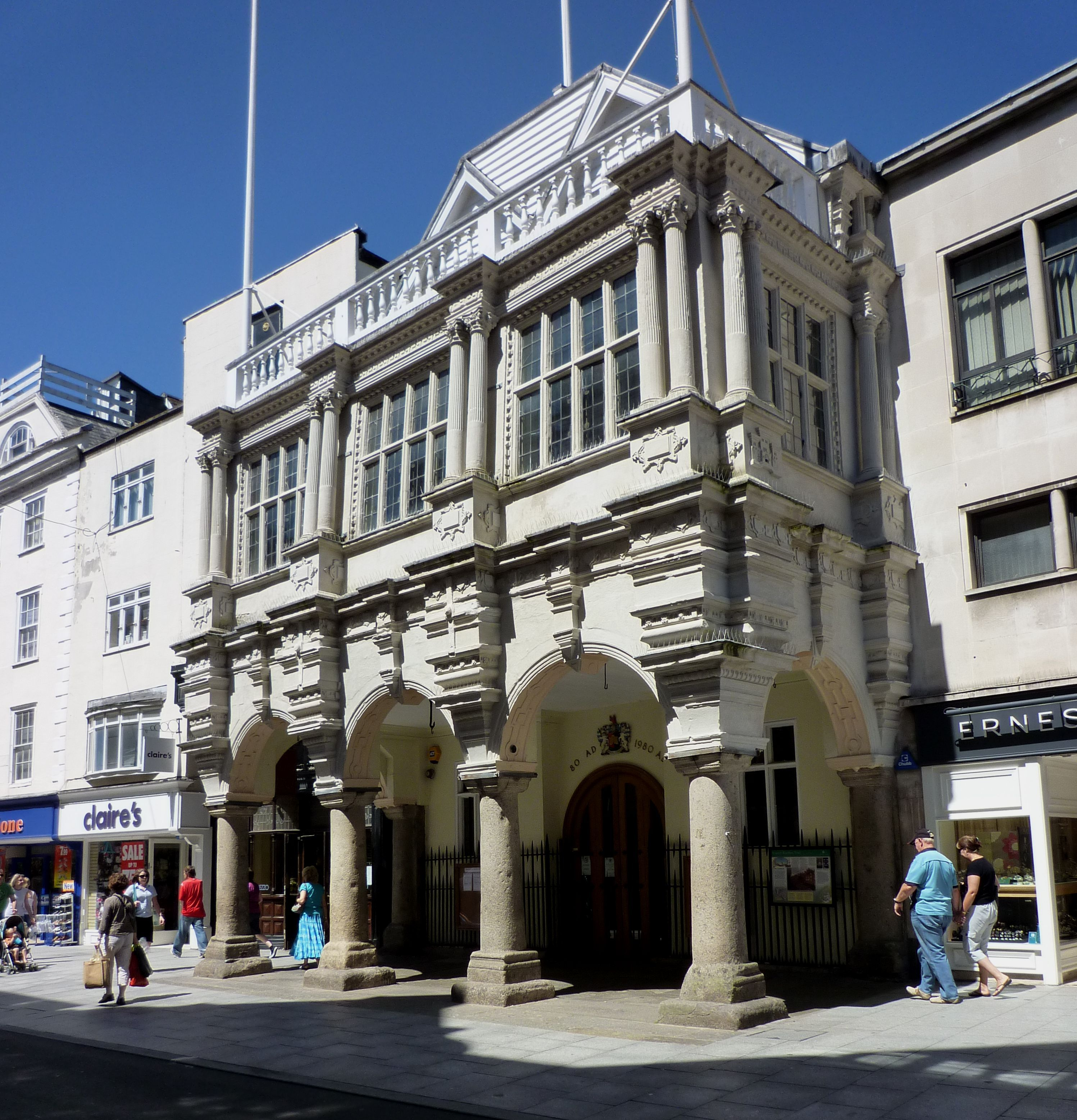

- Location within Devon
- 50.7233°N 3.5318°W
- Location: Exeter, Devon, England

History
- Built: 1470

Site notes
- Architectural style: Ornate Italian style

Listed Building – Grade I
- Designated: 29 January 1953
- Reference no.: 1103905

Exeter Guildhall on the High Street of Exeter, Devon, England has been the centre of civic government for the city for at least 600 years. Much of the fabric of the building is medieval, though the elaborate frontage was added in the 1590s and the interior was extensively restored in the 19th century. It is a Grade I listed building.

== History ==
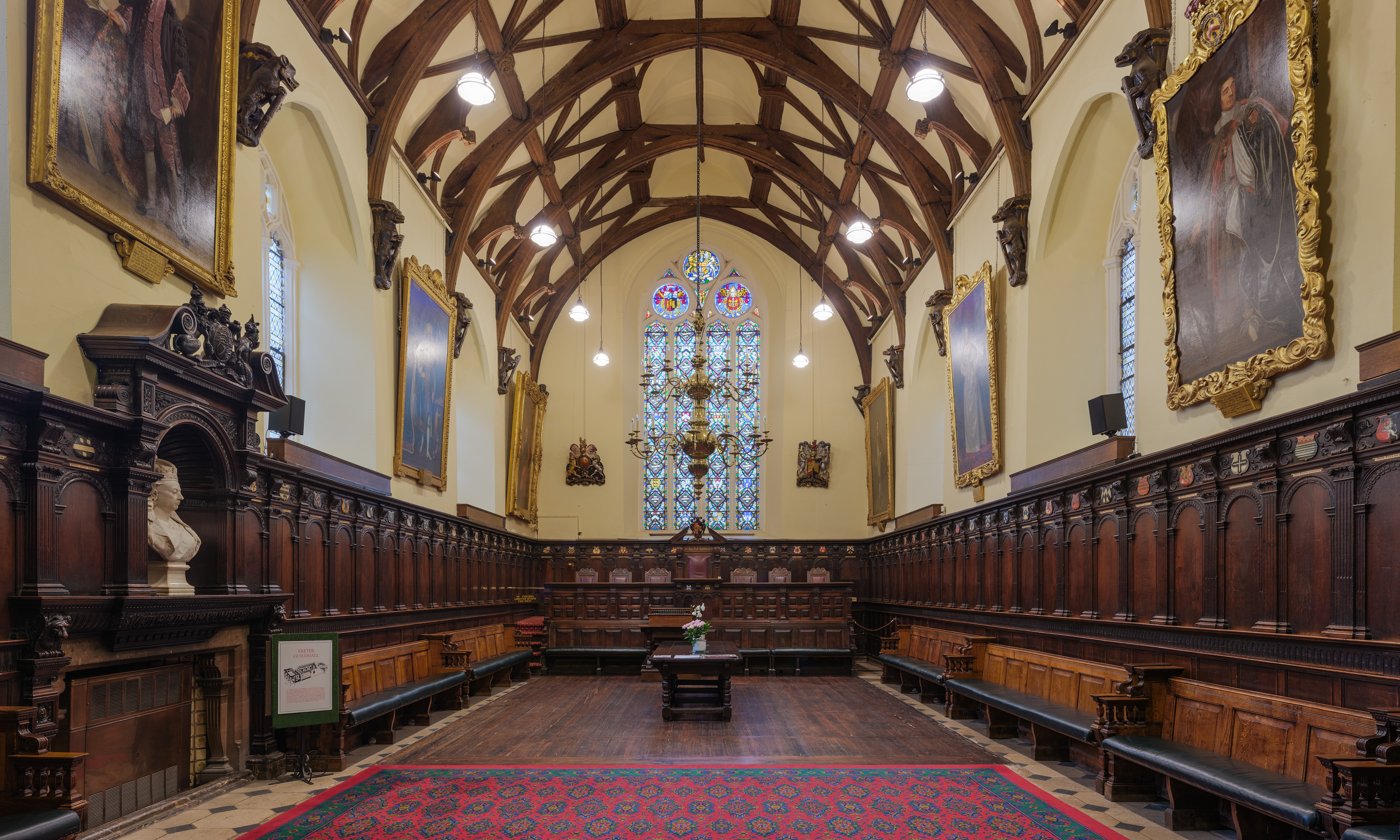
The interior

=== Early history ===
It is certain that the hall has been on its present site since the 14th century, and most probably since the second half of the 12th century. It is also known that there was a guild in Exeter by 1000 AD whose hall was most likely here too. On this basis it has been claimed to be the oldest municipal building in England still in use.

The current building was constructed between 1468 and 1470. The roof timbers and walls are thought to date from 1466. Dendrochronology or tree-ring dating of the timbers give a range between 1463 and 1498. It was refaced between 1593 and 1596 at a cost of £789 in an ornate Italian style that was described by Nikolaus Pevsner as being "as picturesque as it is barbarous". The portico that juts out over the pavement is dated 1594 and its four sturdy granite columns are surmounted by highly decorated corbels of Beer stone. The upper floor, also in Beer stone, is more restrained with strapwork and 16 smaller paired pillars framing large windows that have both mullions and transoms. During renovation work it has been noted that the stonework had once been painted in cream with details in red and blue and the pillars gilded.

The city stocks were once under the portico. The elaborately carved oak door, dated 1593, was made by Nicholas Baggett, a local carpenter. It leads via an anteroom to the council chamber which apparently dates between 1468 and 1470, though it was much restored in Victorian times. The oak panelling around the main hall probably dates from 1594 when the portico was added. The arch-braced roof with seven bays is original; its main trusses rest on carved corbels representing grotesque animals.

It was in Exeter Guildhall that, in the aftermath of the Monmouth Rebellion, Judge Jeffreys held the Bloody Assizes on 14 September 1685.

A large chandelier hangs from the centre of the roof. It was made by Thomas Pyke of Bridgwater and installed in 1789. Apart from this and the roof, all the internal fittings are Victorian, including the stained glass, the gallery, the furniture and the stone floor (all 1863) and the heavily restored Tudor panelling (1887). Above the fireplace is a bust of Queen Victoria by Henry Hugh Armstead.

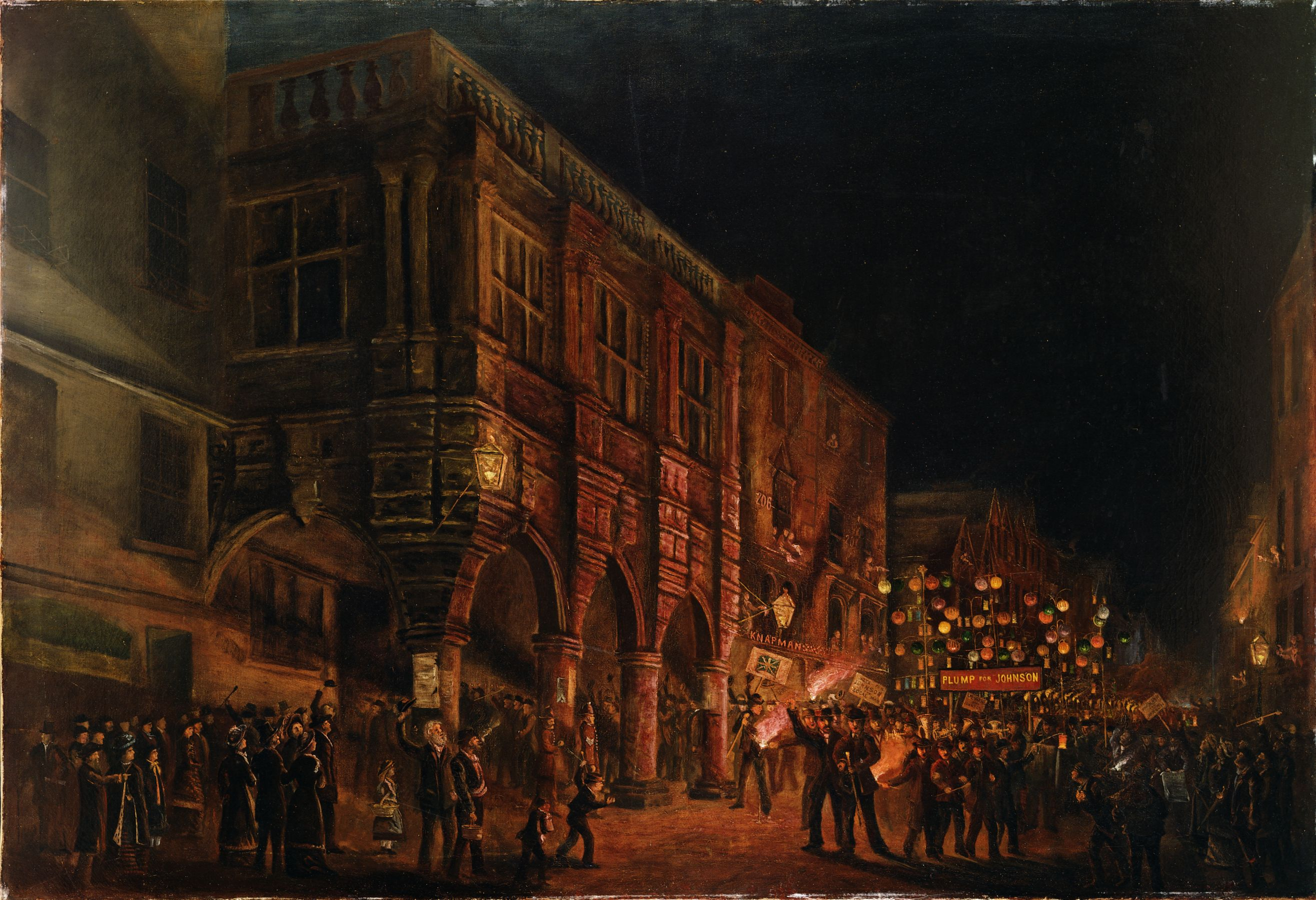
The guildhall on election night in 1880. Painting by Alfred George Palmer in the Royal Albert Memorial Museum's collection (333/1997).

Under the council chamber there is an early 14th-century cellar. This was once a prison that was known as the "pytt of the Guyldhall". In the 16th century another prison, for women, was built on the ground floor at the back of the building. It remained in use until 1887. In 1858 a room was built above this to store the city's records; it was later used as a jury room.

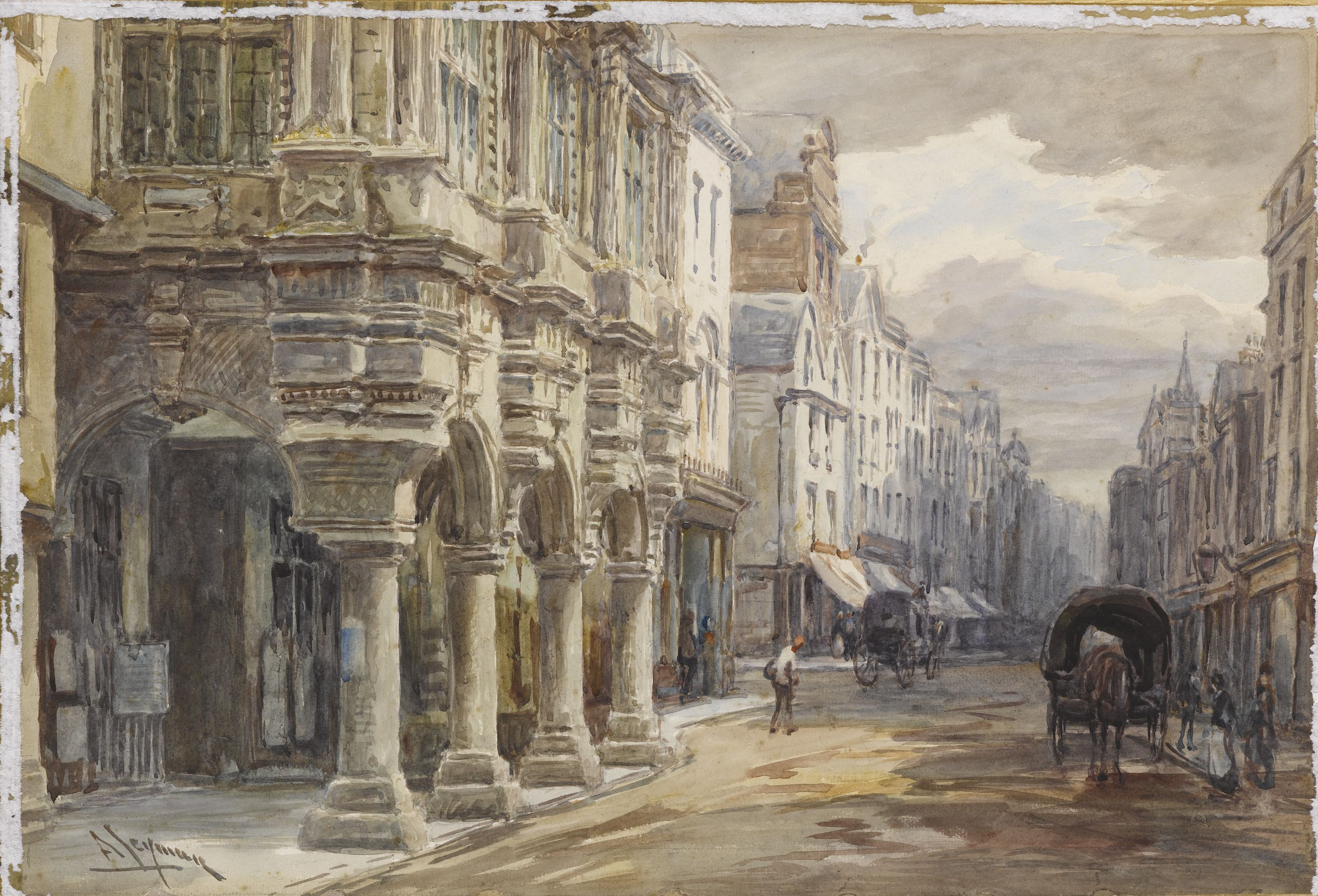
View of the Guildhall and High Street. Painting by Alfred Leyman in the Royal Albert Memorial Museum's collection (218/1970).

=== 20th century ===
The front room above the portico, which was once the council chamber, was converted into the mayor's parlour in 1903. In 1911 the council chamber was the location for an election petition, following the second general election of 1910, between the Liberal candidate Harold St. Maur and the Conservative Henry Duke. The guildhall, which is also a scheduled monument, became a Grade I listed building in 1953.

For much of the 20th century the guildhall was the meeting place of the county borough of Exeter; it continued to be the local seat of government after the formation of the enlarged City of Exeter in 1974. The mayor's parlour, which had a plaster ceiling dating from about 1800, was given a replica ceiling in 1986.

The former Jury Room was restored, after damage from a collapsed ceiling, in 2023.

The guildhall is still used for civil purposes such as official receptions, mayoral banquets, some City Council meetings, other meetings and exhibitions and occasionally as a magistrates' court.

== Heraldry ==
The main chamber displays on the wooden panelling many heraldic escutcheons displaying the arms of various persons who held high office within the City Corporation, covering much of the heraldry of Devonshire. The heraldry was identified in the View of Devonshire by Thomas Westcote (d. circa 1637) and later expanded upon by Colby, Rev. Frederick T., in his The Heraldry of Exeter.

== See also ==
- Guild
- Guildhall

== Sources ==
- Blaylock, S. R. (1990), "Exeter Guildhall", Devon Archaeological Society Proceedings, 48: 123–178, ISSN 0305-5795
- Hoskins, W. G. (2004). Two Thousand Years in Exeter (Revised and updated ed.). Chichester: Phillimore. ISBN 1-86077-303-6.
