= Sign of the Cross (disambiguation) =

The sign of the cross is a ritual hand motion used by some Christians.

Sign of the Cross may also refer to:

- The Sign of the Cross (play), an 1895 play by Wilson Barrett
- The Sign of the Cross (1914 film), an American film directed by Frederick A. Thomson, based on Barrett's play
- The Sign of the Cross (1932 film), an American film directed by Cecil B. DeMille, based on Barrett's play
- The Sign of the Cross (book), 1994 book by Colm Tóibín
- Sign of the Cross (novel), 2006 novel by Chris Kuzneski
- Sign of the Cross, an album by Terveet Kädet
- "Sign of the Cross", a song by Iron Maiden on their album The X Factor
- "Sign of the Cross", a song by Avantasia on their album The Metal Opera
- "Sign on the Cross", a song by Bob Dylan on the album The Bootleg Series Vol. 11: The Basement Tapes Complete
