= The Sign of the Cross (play) =

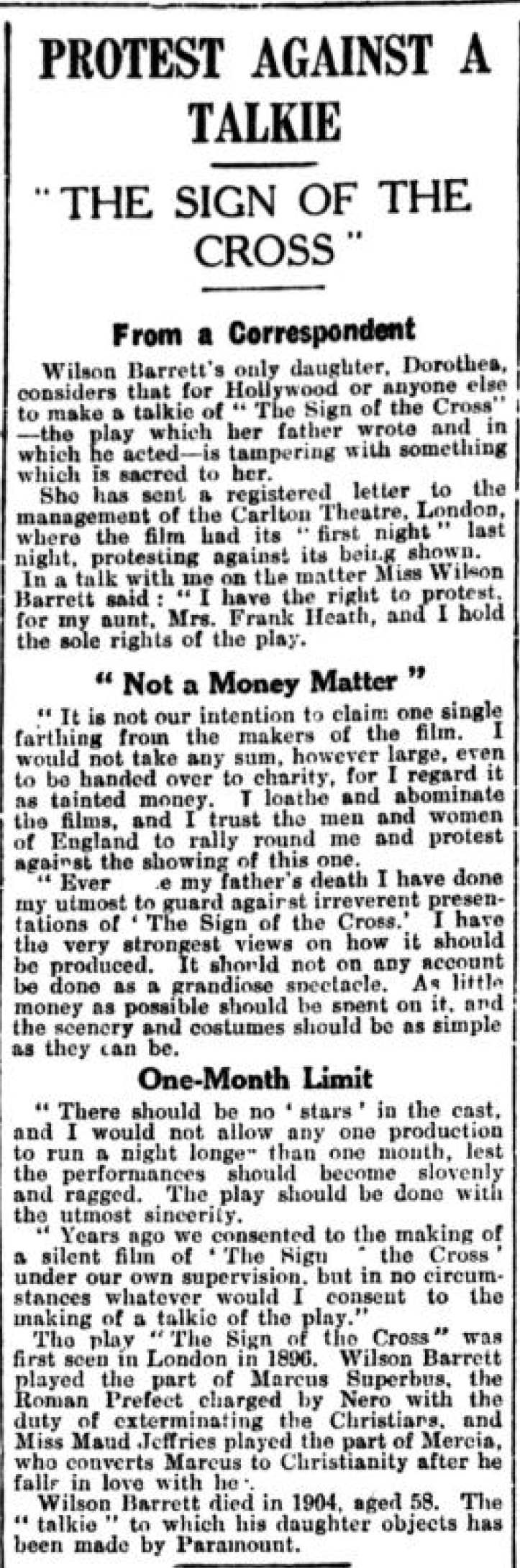
The Citizen, 31 January 1933.

The Sign of the Cross is an 1895 four-act historical tragedy, by Wilson Barrett and popular for several decades. Barrett said its Christian theme was his attempt to bridge the gap between Church and stage. The plot resembles that of Henryk Sienkiewicz's historical novel Quo Vadis, which was first published between 26 March 1895 and 29 February 1896 in the Gazeta Polska, 11 months after the play's first production.

It was the basis for the 1932 film adaptation directed by Cecil B. DeMille: the first DeMille sound film with a religious theme, following two silent films.

== Plot ==
Marcus Superbus, a Roman patrician under Nero, falls in love with a young woman (Mercia) and converts to Christianity for her. Poppea, Nero's wife, is in unrequited lust for Marcus. At the end, Mercia and Marcus sacrifice their lives in the arena to the lions.

=== Comparison to Quo Vadis ===
Much of the plot of Quo Vadis is similar, as far as both featuring main characters named Marcus, against the same historic setting.

The ending is in complete contrast to Quo Vadis, in which Marcus (Vinicius not Superbus) and Lygia (not Mercia) survive and presumably live happily ever after, and Nero and Poppea are the ones who die.

== Theatre presentations ==
It was originally produced by Barrett at the Grand Opera House, St. Louis, Missouri on 28 March 1895 (with Maud Jeffries as Mercia). It was first presented on Broadway at the Knickerbocker Theatre in late 1895. Barrett presented it in England with great success, starting at the Grand Theatre, Leeds, on 26 August 1895. He brought it to the Lyric Theatre, London, in 1896.

Ben Greet, an English actor-manager, formed a Sign of the Cross Company, one of three companies that he managed. It toured Britain and America for many years.

== See also ==
- The Sign of the Cross (1904 film)
- The Sign of the Cross (1914 film)
- The Sign of the Cross (1932 film)
