= Maud Jeffries =

American actress

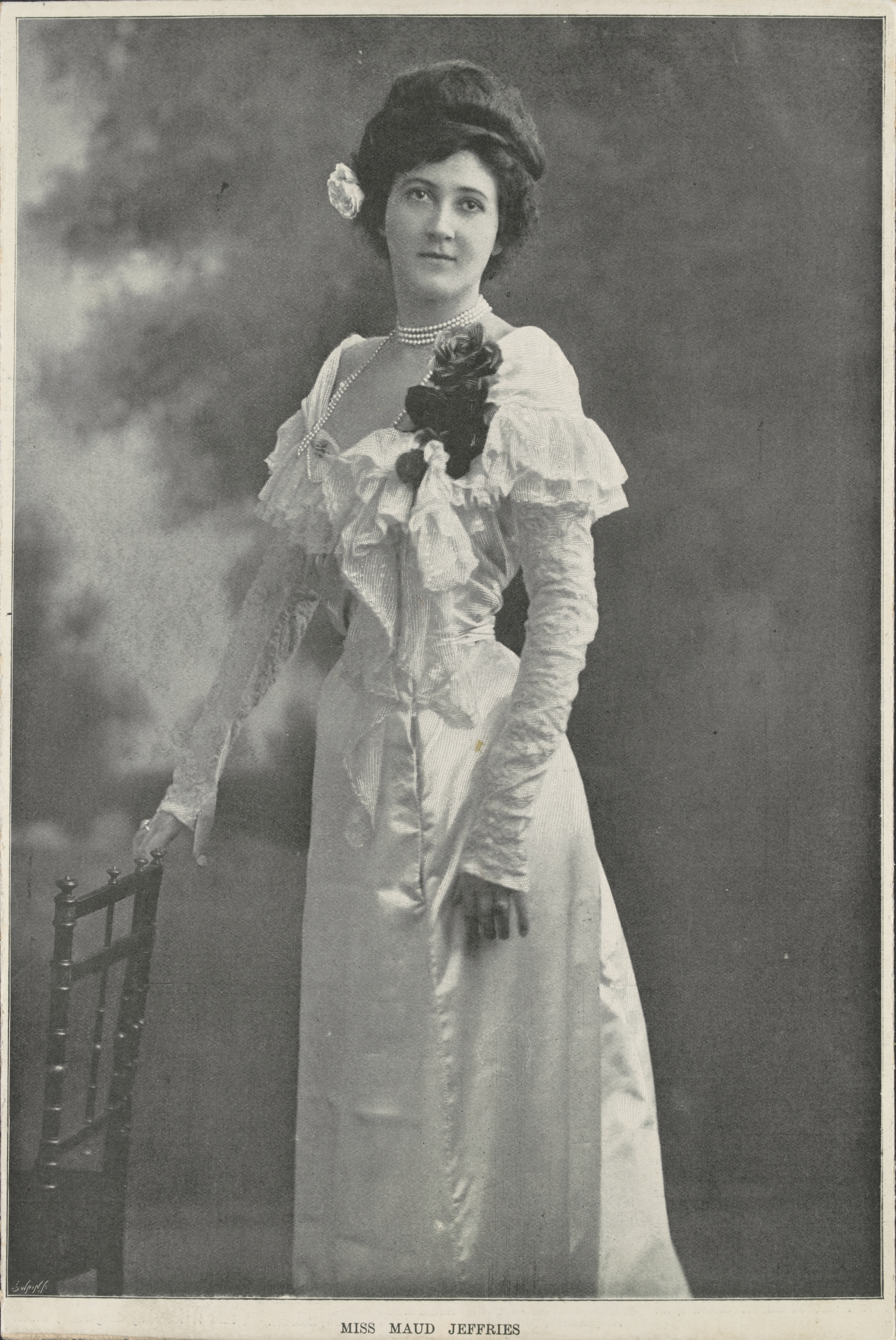
- Maud Evelyn Craven Jeffries
- Born: 14 December 1869; Willow Farm, near Lula, Mississippi, United States
- Died: 26 September 1946 (76 years); Gundaroo, New South Wales, Australia
- Occupation: Actor
- Years active: 1889–1906
- Spouse: James Bunbury Nott Osborne (1878–1934)
- Children: 2

Maud Evelyn Craven Jeffries (14 December 1869 – 26 September 1946) was an American actress. A popular subject for a wide range of theatrical post-cards and studio photographs, she was noted for her height, voice, presence, graceful figure, attractive features, expressive eyes, and beautiful face.

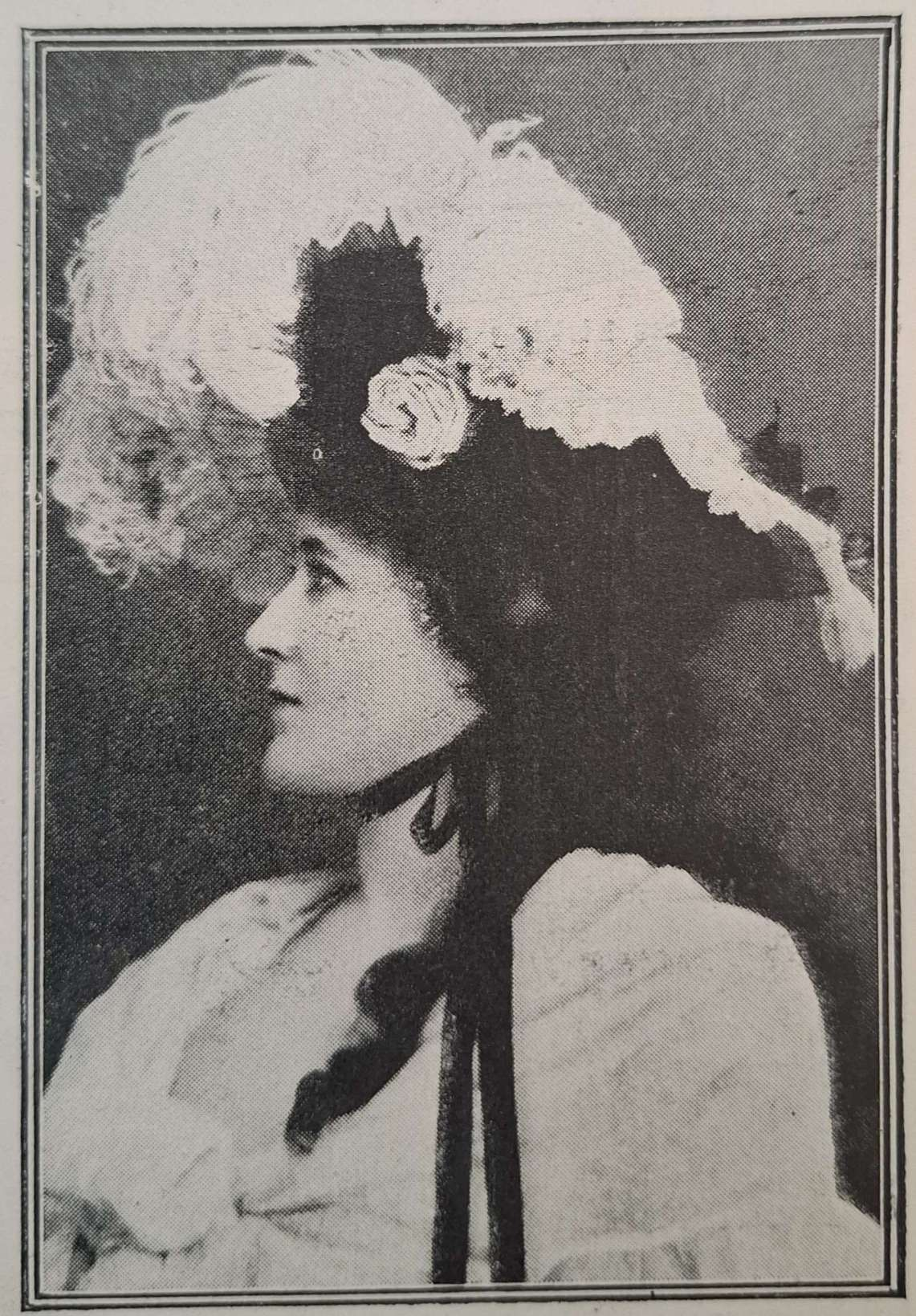
Photo of Maud Jeffries as seen in the Black and White Budget, 20 October 1900.

She married James Bunbury Nott Osborne (1878–1934), a wealthy Australian grazier, Boer war veteran, and former aide-de-camp to New Zealand's Governor-General. Osborne was so enamoured of Jeffries that he joined her theatrical company in late 1903 in order to press his suit.

Engaged in May 1904, they married in October 1904, and had two children together (one of whom died as an infant). Jeffries left the stage in 1906, and continued to live a quiet, very happy life, devoted to her family and her beautifully designed gardens, on their family property, "Bowylie", at Gundaroo, NSW, until her death, at age 76, from cancer.

An audience favourite wherever she went, Jeffries' performances over a decade in New York, London, Australia, and New Zealand met wide critical acclaim, especially in the role of Desdemona in Shakespeare's Othello and, in particular, for her creation of the role of Mercia in Wilson Barrett's masterpiece The Sign of the Cross. On viewing Jeffries' performance (when just 20) as Almida in Claudian, one critic observed:

In Maud Jeffries we have an almost ideal Almida. It is emphatically a part for a young girl, and Miss Jeffries made it throb with life and genius. So youthful an actress so capable of feeling, not merely interpreting emotion, ought to and will have a future before her.

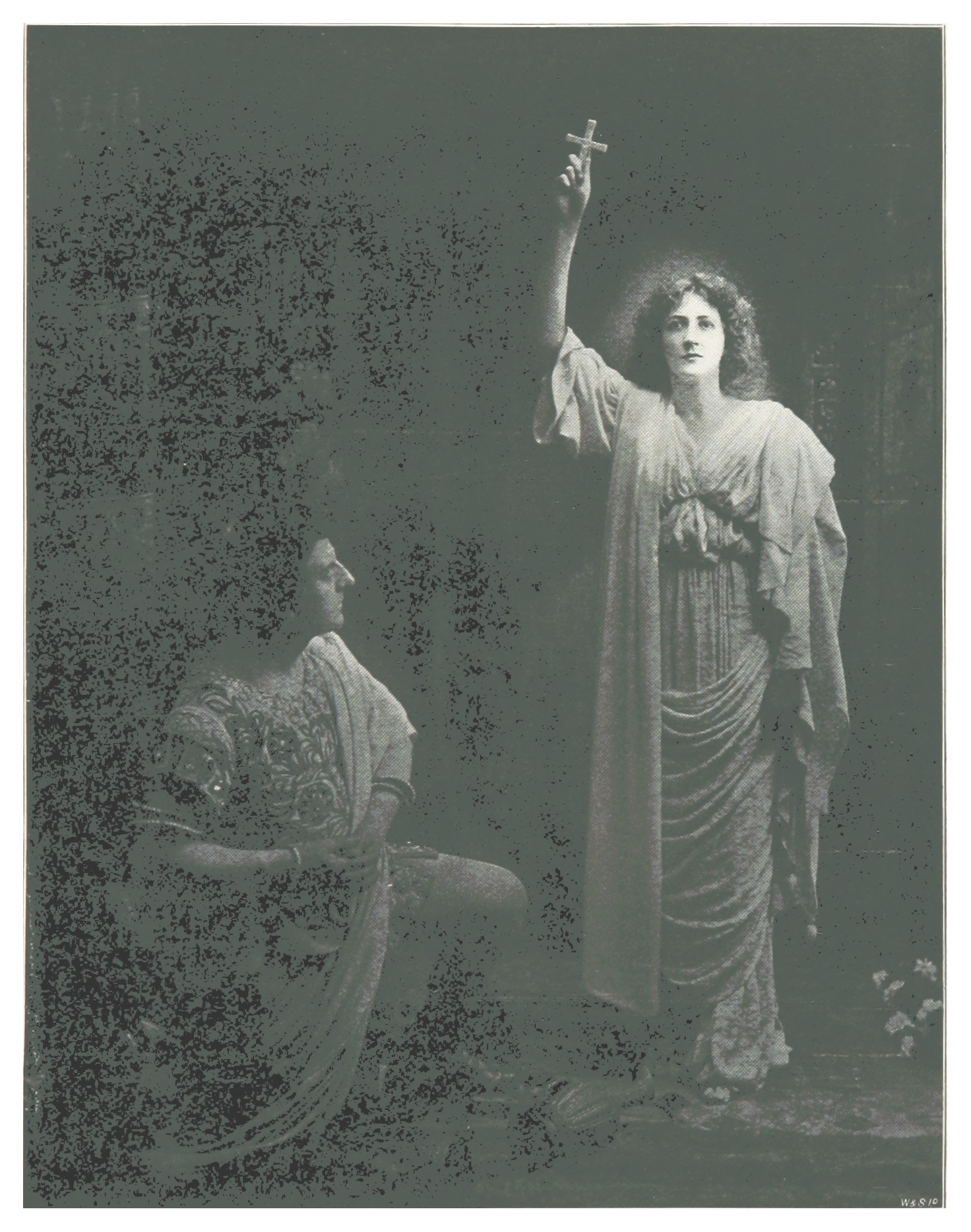
Wilson Barrett and Maud Jeffries (as Mercia): The Sign of the Cross (1895)

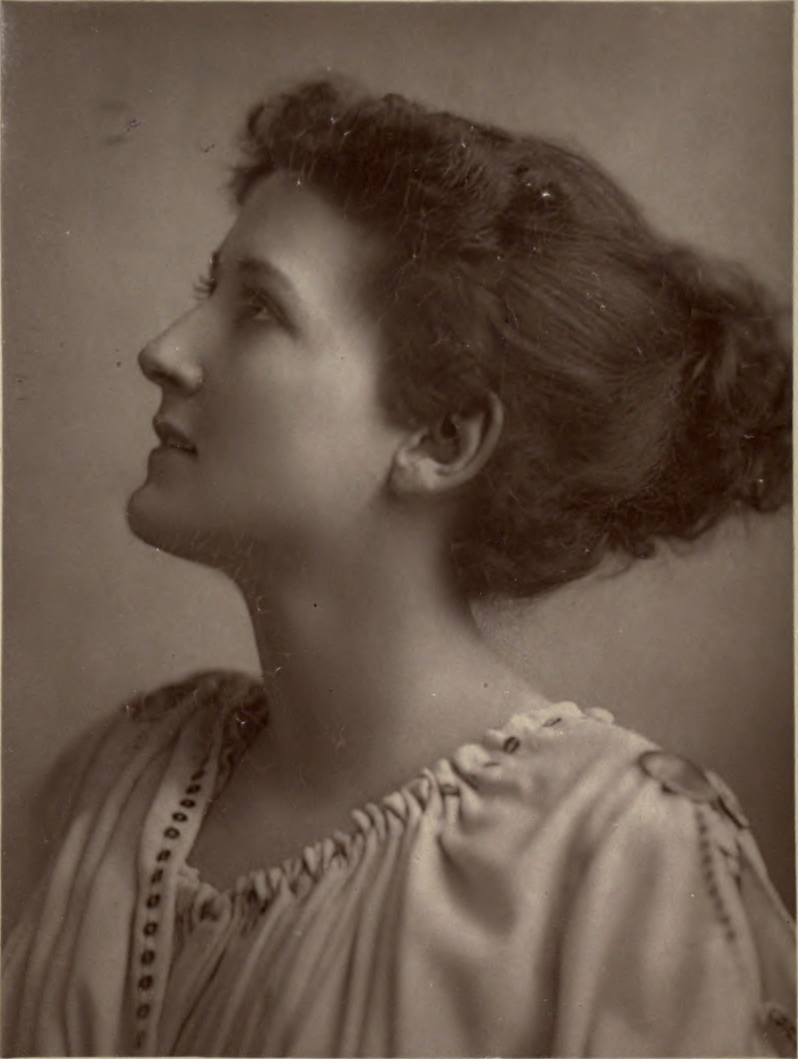
Maud Jeffries (1891)

== Early life and family ==
Jeffries was born on 14 December 1869 at Willow Farm, near Lula in Coahoma County, Mississippi, to James Kenilworth Jeffries (1845–), a cotton planter, and his wife Elizabeth Field Jeffries, née Smith (1847–). She had three younger brothers: Henry (1872–), James K. jnr. (1875–), and Norman Weathers Jeffries (1877–1959). Norman went with his sister to Australia and New Zealand, as part of her theatre company, in 1897, and remained with her company until she left the stage in 1906.

Initially educated at home, and originally intending to become a teacher, from the age of 13 she attended the prestigious Miss Higbee's School for Young Ladies in Memphis, Tennessee. A change in her family's fortunes meant that a career as a teacher was no longer possible, and her family encouraged her to pursue an acting career.

== Theatrical career ==
From the age of 5, Jeffries regularly entertained her family with recitations; and, once at Miss Higbee's School for Young Ladies, in addition to her elocutionary skills, she also began to display a great talent at music, and at singing.

Apparently, when offstage, Jeffries was a somewhat modest and shy person; and, except for (perhaps, only) two occasions throughout her career — in The Memphis Daily Appeal of 9 July 1888, and The Seattle Post-Intelligencer, of 19 December 1897 — she refused to be interviewed by the press.

=== United States (1887–1890) ===
In October 1887, when Jeffries was just seventeen, she performed in Lizzie Evans's new play, Our Angel, at the New Memphis Theatre.

Interview with Miss Maud Jeffries (then aged 18)

Miss Jeffries … has been endowed by nature with the qualities that generally succeed in the dramatic profession. She has youth, beauty, talent, a fine voice and striking presence. Her tall, willowy form, deep black eyes, clear cut profile, and black hair at once suggest the ideal representative of the tragic muse. Miss Jeffries has … signed a contract for next season, on liberal terms, with Miss Lizzie Evans …

It will be remembered that Miss Jeffries made her debut here last October in "Our Angel", playing the part of the governess in place of a lady temporarily indisposed. Her success was instantaneous, and the press were liberal in their commendation of her acting. Miss Evans was much pleased with her work and urged her to persevere. Thus encouraged Miss Jeffries went to New York last summer, and there pursued her studies under the direction of Mrs. Emma Waller. She made rapid progress, and in March succeeded in getting an engagement to play leading business with William Hamilton, who was making a tour of the New England States with a piece called "Rockwood".

— The Memphis Daily Appeal, 9 July 1888

Leaving Memphis on 14 August 1888 for New York, she joined the Lizzie Evans company; however, within three weeks it was reported that "Miss Maud Jeffries has been compelled to give up her engagement with the Lizzie Evans company and has returned home for rest and quiet" — with a more detailed account emerging a week later:

Miss Maud Jeffries: Illness Compels her Temporary Retirement from the Stage The promising dramatic career of Miss Maud Jeffries threatens to be abruptly terminated by an affection of the heart, which make her temporary retirement from a life of excitement imperative. It will be remembered that she led here for New York a few weeks ago to join the Evans company and begin rehearsals in "Rockwood", which has been rewritten, and placed under the management of E.J. Evans. At the second rehearsal Miss Jeffries succumbed to a nervous strain and fainted on the stage. Acting under medical advice she cancelled her engagement and prepared to return home. The management tried to persuade her with a promise to rejoin the company upon her recovery, but this arrangement she felt compelled to decline, as it might jeopardize her reputation as an actress to play under such physical disadvantages. She therefore determined to bid a long farewell to the boards and to seek to regain her health amid the reposeful associations and soothing influences of home.

— The Memphis Daily Appeal, 9 September 1888

In 1889 she went to New York and worked with Augustin Daly's company, playing small parts in pays such as "A Midsummer Night's Dream" and "As You Like It". Whilst working with Daly's company, she attracted the attention of Wilson Barrett.

=== England (1890–1892) ===
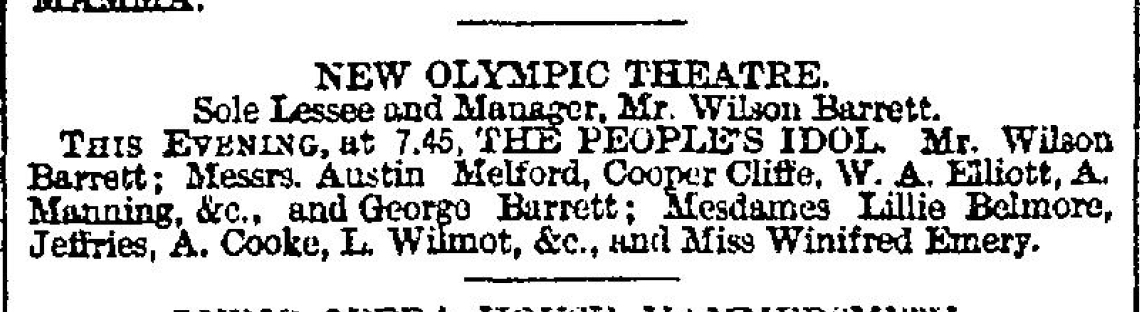
Advertising Jeffries' English debut (4 December 1890)

Jeffries left the United States on the RMS City of Chester on 6 August 1890, and arrived at Liverpool on 16 August 1890.

Her first appearance on the English stage was in a small part in a new play, The People's Idol, that Barrett had written in collaboration with Victor Widnell. She made her English debut, on 4 December 1890, in the play's first public performance: on the opening night of The New Olympic Theatre, in London's Drury Lane, an entirely new, purpose-built theatre, which Barrett also managed.

In August 1891, Wilson Barrett discovered that, due to a half forgotten arrangement made several years earlier, his leading lady at the time, "Maud Elmore", was contracted to appear with Morris Abrahams at the Pavilion Theatre for the whole of the 1891/1892 season. Within days, it was being reported that "Miss Maud Jeffries, a former member of the Daly Company, is now leading lady in Mr. Wilson Barrett's company".

Miss Maud Jeffries: The "Leading Lady" in Tears

[Having arrived at Liverpool], Miss Jeffries then went to London, starting at the Olympic theater … playing a variety of small parts and understudying some of the larger ones … and it was shortly after this that Mr. Barrett experienced some little difficulty about a leading lady. Miss Jeffries received an invitation to Mr. Barrett's home, where a few friends had assembled, and after dinner, she was asked in a casual way to give the end of the second act of "Claudian". This was done, those present arranging themselves round and forming an audience, and at the conclusion they all expressed the utmost pleasure at her performance.

It was then that Mr. Barrett told her he wished her to play "leading business". She was so utterly surprised at the proposition that she burst out sobbing and said she would not do it, for she not only felt incapable of accomplishing it successfully, but she did not believe in such "jumps". Miss Jeffries immediately cabled home to America, telling her parents that she was leaving England by the next ship. The following day, as Mr. Barrett knew, she was lunching with some American friends, and he sent word to them to do all in their power to persuade her to accept his offer. Miss Jeffries' friends did nothing but talk to her of the advantages which would accrue to her from taking such a position, and, eventually, out of sheer desperation, she accepted, and it may safely be said has never regretted it.

— The Seattle Post-Intelligencer, 19 December 1897

Perhaps her reaction to Barrett's unexpected announcement was somewhat amplified by the fact that, as a consequence of becoming his leading lady, she had to master a total of 14 leading roles in the space of just three weeks.

She soon settled into her new position, and by 22 October 1891, she was playing Desdemona, to Barrett's Othello, in the first performance of an entirely new production of Shakespeare's Othello, that Barrett had adapted to accommodate Jeffries "unique new school acting style" (Thomas, 1894, p. 111). Jeffries was an outstanding success and, throughout the rest of her career, her performances as Desdemona were considered to be amongst her finest roles.

Miss Maud Jeffries as Desdemona

… At the close of the fourth act, Mr. Barrett's honours are shared with Miss Maud Jeffries, the Desdemona. She is excellent from the beginning, but here her excellence becomes remarkable. None could listen unmoved to the tearless grief expressed in her exquisite delivery of the lines " Am I the motive of these tears, my lord ?" and I am disposed to give her inspiration credit for discovering the source of the deep stream of pathos that flows through this scene. Ordinarily the interest in the tragedy begins hereabouts to fail. But it is scarce too much to affirm that directly Miss Jeffries appears prominently in the play, it acquires a vitality at once surprising and delightful. This is partly owing to the extreme nobility and beauty of her conception, partly to the fact that a bountiful Nature has endowed her with a personality equal to the task of realising that conception, and partly to Mr. Barrett's subdued tone and harmonious accompaniment, so to speak, during this touching scene. The tempest has been sown, the whirlwind will be reaped anon. Between-whiles there is calm. There is a moment even when the old worship regains ascendancy; when that lovely "weed that smell'st so sweet" resumes its sway over the aching sense; when with despairing tenderness Othello clasps her to his breast. It is but for a moment. At her innocent question "What sin have I committed" — "committed", that word for ages linked with adultery — the crime and all its revolting images, hideous and maddening memories, drive from his mind all other thoughts, and once more loose the torrent of his righteous wrath and woe.

With the last act comes the most beautiful scene of all. To double, treble, the tremendous dramatic appeal, Mr. Barrett opens it with Desdemona's disrobing and the Willow Song. Full of pathos it ever has been, but with this addition its pathos is tenfold. Such a prelude to the sacrifice renders the murder piteous in the extreme. It is not often that players of Shakespeare can move a theatreful to tears, perhaps therefore it is worth recording that this scene as interpreted by Miss Jeffries, with faultless feeling for Desdemona's forlorn sense of desolation, deeply affects her hearers. As does the beauty of the picture she creates. Truly it might be of her, lonely and silent and sad, that Browning wrote:

The same great, griefful air,
As stands i' the dusk, on altar that I know,
Left alone with one moonbeam in her cell,
Our Lady of all the Sorrows.

The pathos of her acting indeed could not be deepened. Nor could there be improvement in the child-like innocence with which she combats Emilia's gross estimate of women's honour. The whole passage is exquisitely rendered, and will remain in memory as one of the gems of this most interesting revival …

— Addison Bright, The Theatre, December 1891

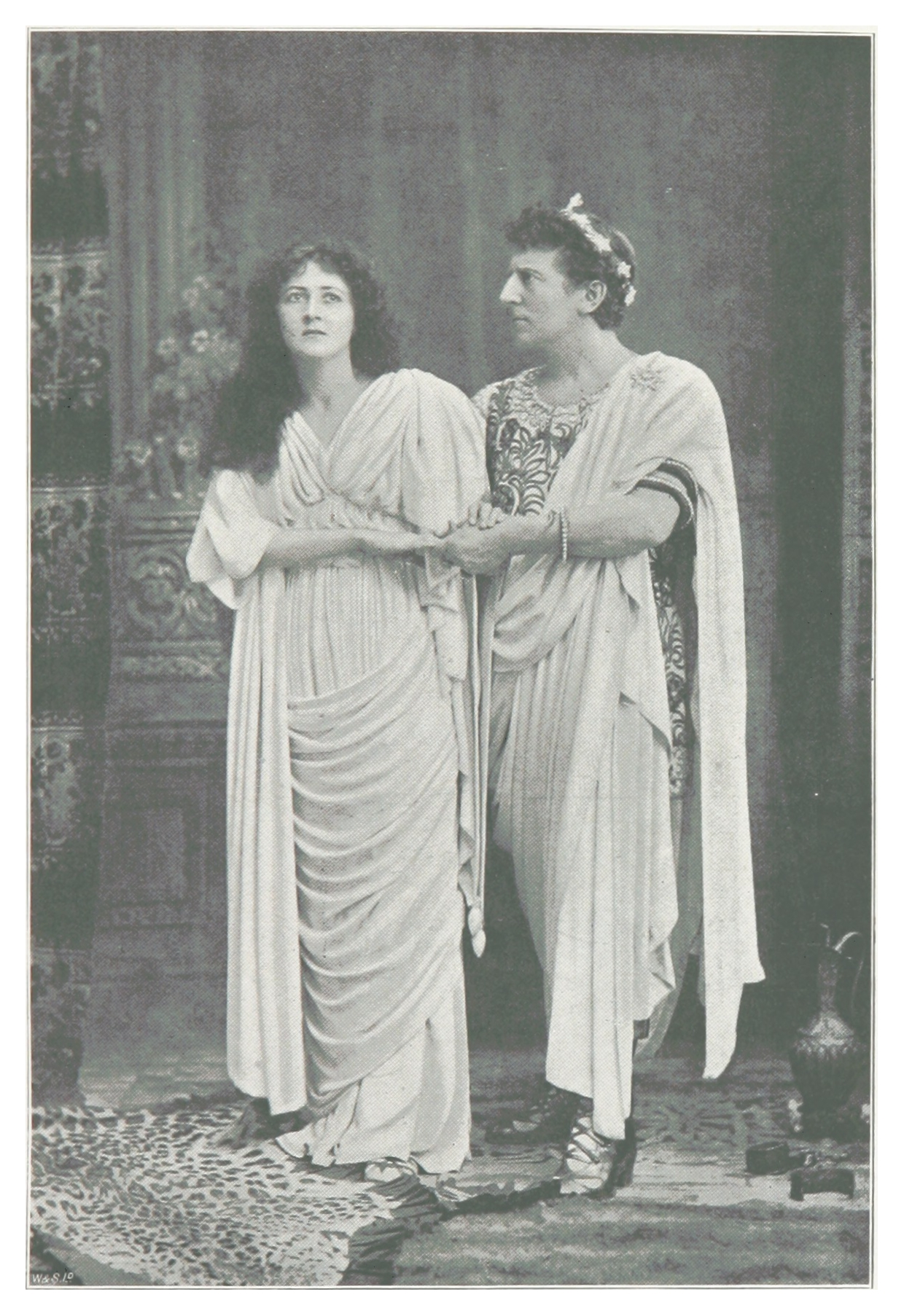
Maud Jeffries and Wilson Barrett (in his elevator shoes): The Sign of the Cross (1895)

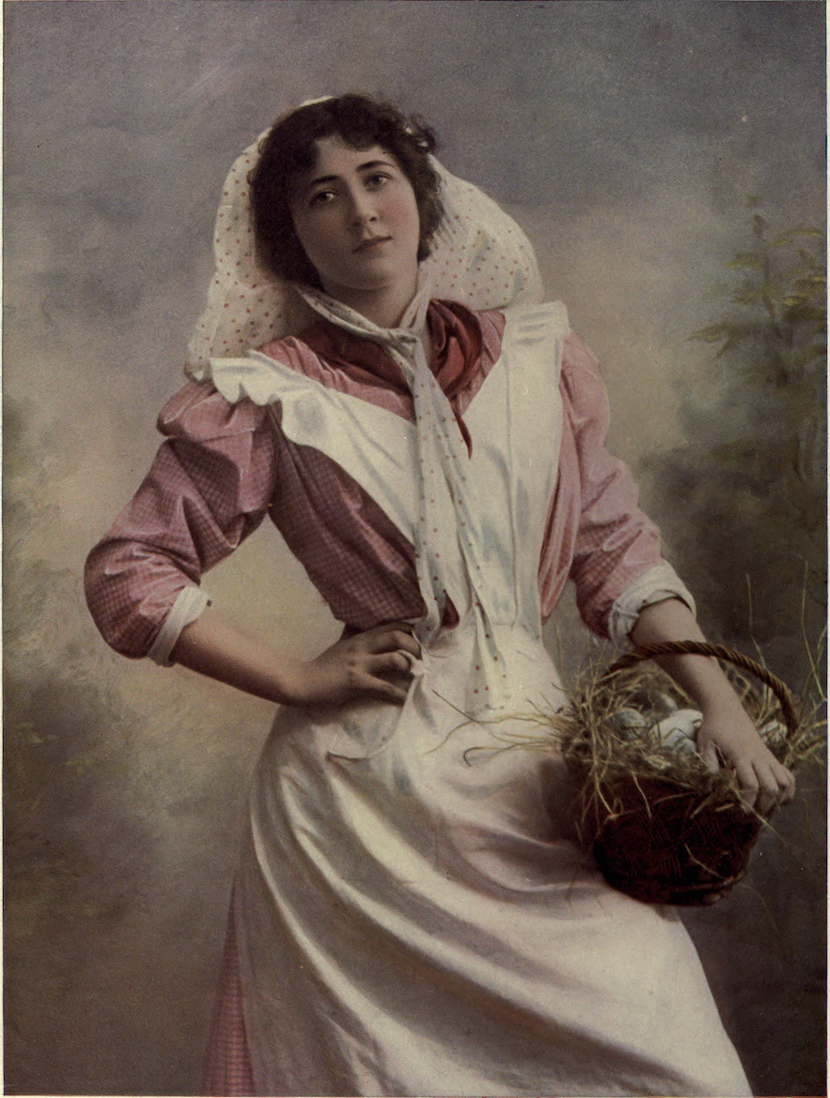
Hand-coloured cabinet photograph of Maud Jeffries as "Kate" in The Manxman (c.1900)

=== United States (1892–1895) ===
Barrett's 1892/1893 tour opened in Philadelphia, on 21 November 1892, at the Duquesne Theater, with a performance of Hamlet.

Jeffries was involved in the creation of Wilson Barrett's play The Sign of the Cross, which was originally produced at the Grand Opera House, St. Louis, Missouri on 28 March 1895.

By the end of 1896, Jeffries was well-established as Barrett's leading lady, and had played opposite Barrett in a wide range of works, including:

- Shakespeare's Twelfth Night, Hamlet, and Othello
- Ben-my-Chree and The Bondman (stage versions of Hall Caine's novels The Deemster and The Bondman respectively)
- Brandon Thomas' The Color Sergeant
- Henry Arthur Jones and Henry Herman's Chatterton and The Silver King
- Barrett's The Miser (adapted from a poem, "A Masque", by Silas Weir Mitchell);
- Barrett's The People's Idol (written in collaboration with Victor Widnell)
- Barrett's The Acrobat (a version of Charles Dillon's Belphegor)
- Barrett's Jenny the Barber
- Henry Arthur Jones's A Clerical Error
- Barrett's Our Pleasant Sins
- Barrett's Pharoah
- Benjamin Thompson's The Stranger (a version of the melodramatic Menschenhass und Reue ("Misanthropy and Repentance") of August von Kotzebue)
- W. G. Wills' Claudian
- James Sheridan Knowles' Virginius
- Barrett's own masterpiece, The Sign of the Cross

=== Australia (1897–1898) ===
One of the unusual features of the company Barrett brought to Australia was that it also contained the brothers of three of his female stars: Norman Jeffries, the brother of Maud Jeffries, Daniel McCarthy, the brother of Lillah McCarthy, and Paul Belmore, the brother of Daisy Belmore (1874–1954).

Barrett's company opened its Australian season for J. C. Williamson at Melbourne's Princess Theatre (18 December 1897 – 2 March 1898), and then went on to Sydney's Her Majesty's Theatre (5 March-21 May 1898), Adelaide's Theatre Royal (4–16 June 1898), and Perth's Theatre Royal (21 June–1 July 1898), presented a number of different works at each theatre, the first of which was Claudian (with Jeffries as Almida); other works included Hamlet (with Jeffries as Ophelia), Othello (with Jeffries as Desdemona), Virginius (with Jeffries as Virginia), Ben-my-Chree, (with Jeffries as Mona), The Manxman (with Jeffries as Kate Cregeen), and The Silver King (with Jeffries as Nellie Denver). On 16 July, the company left Sydney for Vancouver on the SS Aorangi.

One of the most irresistible tricks of the beauteous — she really is a beauty — Maud Jeffries, is her contempt for corsets.

In no play of Wilson Barrett's, up to date, has the dark-eyed Maud encircled her voluptuous form in aught but draperies, and consequently the audience has been free to revel in the fetching curves of a real live woman that it wants to cuddle on the spot, instead of a combination of steel and whalebone and woman that had no "points" different from any other.

— The Bulletin, 12 February 1896

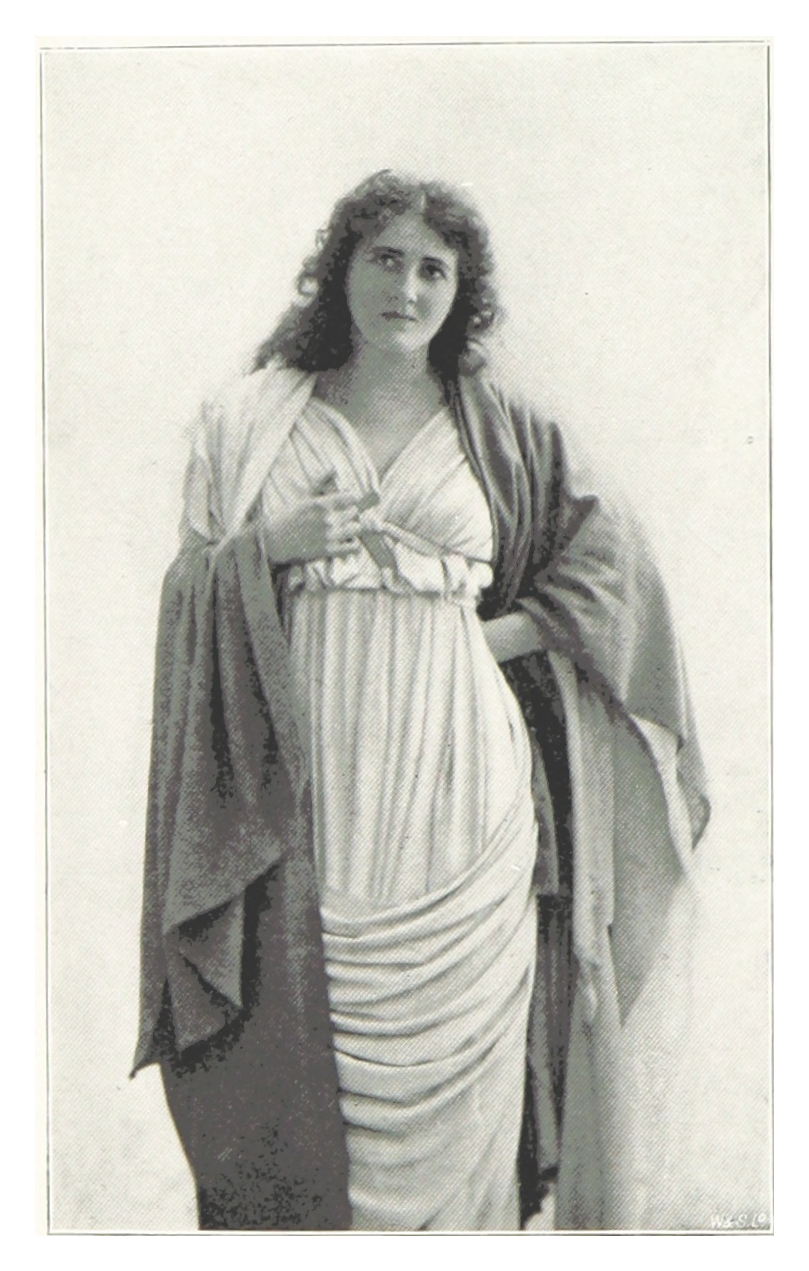
Maud Jeffries: The Sign of the Cross (1895)

=== United Kingdom (1898–) ===
Jeffries first appearance for this tour was with Barrett on 25 September 1898, at the Theatre Royal, in Cardiff, as Kate Cregeen in The Manxman. Jeffries' performance was outstanding, and there were 10 minutes of curtain calls.

=== Australasia (1903–1906) ===
Following an arrangement between J. C. Williamson and Herbert Beerbohm Tree, the company of Julius Knight (1863–1941) and Maud Jeffries toured Australasia for four years.

The first performance of the Knight-Jeffries Company in its farewell New Zealand season was a "double bill" of Davy Garrick and Comedy and Tragedy at Christchurch's Theatre Royal on 22 November 1905. The company performed in Christchurch, Dunedin, Wellington, Masterton, and Auckland, and its final performance was The Lady of Lyons, at Auckland's Her Majesty's Theatre, on Saturday, 17 February 1906.

The final performance of the Knight-Jeffries Company was with The Lady of Lyons, in Sydney's Palace Theatre, on 16 March 1906. After the final curtain the audience was addressed by Julius Knight, and by Maud Jeffries (in the company of her husband "who came from the wings, and was heartily cheered as he stood beside her").

Such was the impact of her Australian stage presence that, a decade later, one social correspondent was recalling Mrs. J.B.N. Osborne as "the handsome and graceful actress, Miss Maud Jeffries", whilst another theatre critic still believed that her performances far outshone those of the current favourite-of-the-day, Melbourne born actress Madge Titheradge. Even later, in 1917, a racing journalist was recalling her as "the statuesque American actress" who had married the Osborne brother "commonly known as 'Nott' Osborne".

== J.B.N. Osborne ==
External images
- Maud Jeffries and James Osborne.
- Julius Knight (as Kara) and Maud Jeffries (as Yo-San) in The Darling of the Gods (1904).
- Julius Knight (State Library of New South Wales Collection)
- "The Royal Party at Auckland" (including "Captain Osborne, A.D.C. to Lord Ranfurly")", The Otago Witness, (26 June 1901), p.37.
- Lieutenant Osborne's Slouch Hat (Australian War Memorial Collection)
- Lieutenant Osborne's Aiguillette (Australian War Memorial Collection)
- Lieutenant Osborne's Sword and Scabbard (Australian War Memorial Collection)
- Lieutenant Osborne's Service Dress Tunic (Australian War Memorial Collection)
- Lieutenant Osborne's Full Dress Tunic (Australian War Memorial Collection)

=== Early life and family ===
James Bunbury Nott Osborne (1878–1934) — most often referred to in the press as "J.B.N. Osborne", less often as "James Osborne" and, even, sometimes, as "Nott Osborne" — the son, and one of the nine children of Patrick Hill "Pat" Osborne (1832–1902) and Elizabeth Jane "Jeanie" Osborne (1847–1938), née Atkinson was born on 14 May 1878 in Sydney. He attended Rugby School from 1892 to 1894.

=== Soldier ===
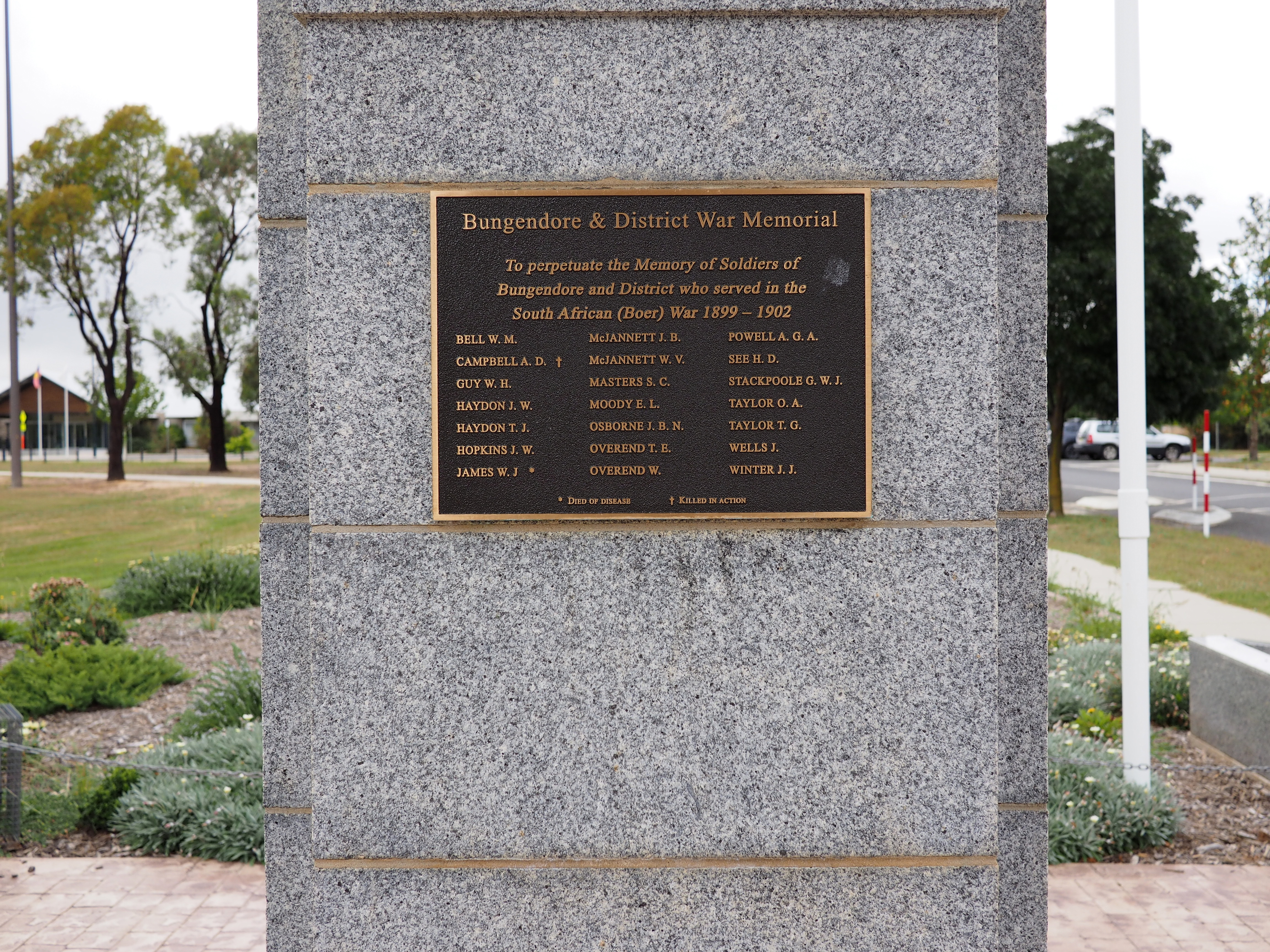
Bungendore & District War Memorial: Boer War Honour Roll

In early 1898, Osborne was appointed second lieutenant, in command of the Bungendore troop of the First Australian (Volunteer) Horse Regiment; and, a year later, "was proving [himself to be] not only a smart officer, but a very popular one with the men". In October 1899, he was one of two members of the New South Wales military forces to be briefly appointed honorary aides-de-camp to the staff of Earl Beauchamp, the Governor of New South Wales, who was also Honorary Colonel-in-Chief of the First Australian Horse Regiment.

He commanded the first troop of the 1st Australian Horse service squadron to be sent to South Africa. Lieutenant Osborne sailed with his troops for South Africa on the S.S. Langton Grange, leaving Newcastle on 15 November 1899, arriving in South Africa, at Durban, on 13 December 1899. He was present at the Relief of Kimberley and, in March 1900, left the Australian Horse and took up a commission with the British 16th Lancers: the regiment of his elder brother, Second Lieutenant Edwin Francis Fitzroy Osborne (1873–1895), who had died four years earlier, of enteric fever, at Lucknow, on 2 September 1895. He was closely involved in the surrender of Bloemfontein in March 1900; and, in early May 1900, he contracted enteric fever. He was hospitalized in Bloemfontein; however, his condition did not respond to treatment, and he was invalided to England.

Having participated in operations in the Orange Free State and Transvaal, and having seen action at Reit River, Klip Drift, Relief of Kimberley, Paardeberg, Poplar Grove, Driefontein, Karee Siding, Belfast and Slingersfontein, Osborne was awarded the Queen's South Africa Medal with five clasps. His service is commemorated on a plaque (dedicated on 29 May 2011) affixed to the Bungendore and District War Memorial.

He remained on the "unattached list" until he formally resigned his commission in December 1904.

=== Aide-de-camp to Earl Ranfurly ===
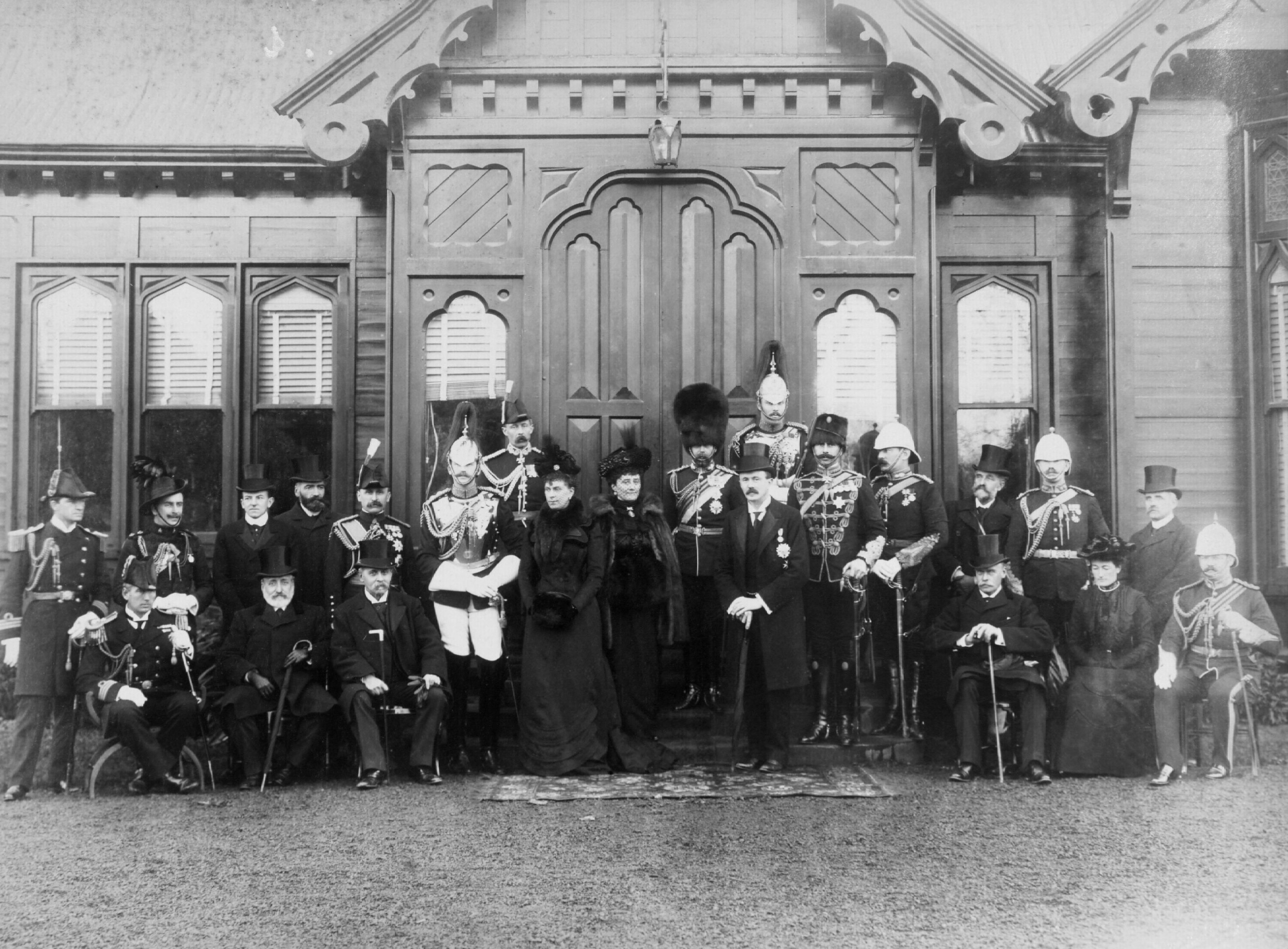
"Captain J.B.N. Osborne", second from left, back row, aide-de-camp to Lord Ranfurly, with the Duke and Duchess of Cornwall and York (1901)

In 1901, appointed to the rank of captain, he served as the aide-de-camp to Earl Ranfurly, the Governor-General of New Zealand, in particular, during the visit of the Duke and Duchess of Cornwall and York (later, King George V and Queen Mary) in June 1901.

=== Stage and screen ===
Later described as "a squatter who took to the stage for the love of a lady", Osborne made his stage debut (as "Nott Osborne"), at the last moment, in the role of Major Doria — Maud Jeffries was playing the part of Donna Romana Volonna — in a performance of The Eternal City (adapted for the stage from Hall Caine's novel of the same name), at Her Majesty's Theatre on 23 January 1904: "Mention may be made of Mr Nott Osborne as Major Doria (Governor of St Angelo), who, in making a promising stage debut, though obviously nervous over the first few words, displayed a pleasant voice and manner."

In 1918 Osborne played a leading role in Alfred Rolfe's society melodrama, Cupid Camouflaged, a silent movie produced to raise funds for the Red Cross, and starring many members of Sydney Society. A reviewer of the premiere performance on 31 May 1918, noting that, although the movie itself was "distinctly amateurish" overall, did observe that "some of the best work in the picture is done by Mr. James Osborne".

=== Death ===
James Bunbury Nott Osborne died, aged 56, in Sydney, on 24 June 1934. He was interred at Waverley Cemetery, Sydney, along with the remains of his daughter Elizabeth Osborne (1911–1911).

== Marriage, children, and life after the theatre ==
=== Marriage ===
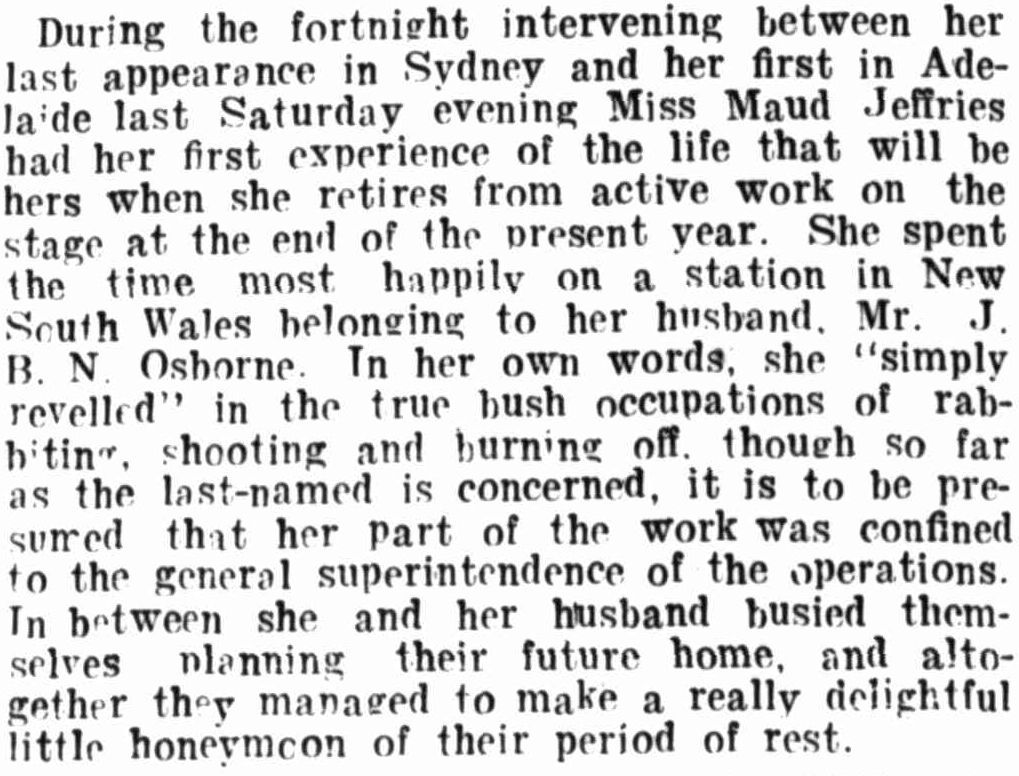
Punch, Melbourne, 20 July 1905.

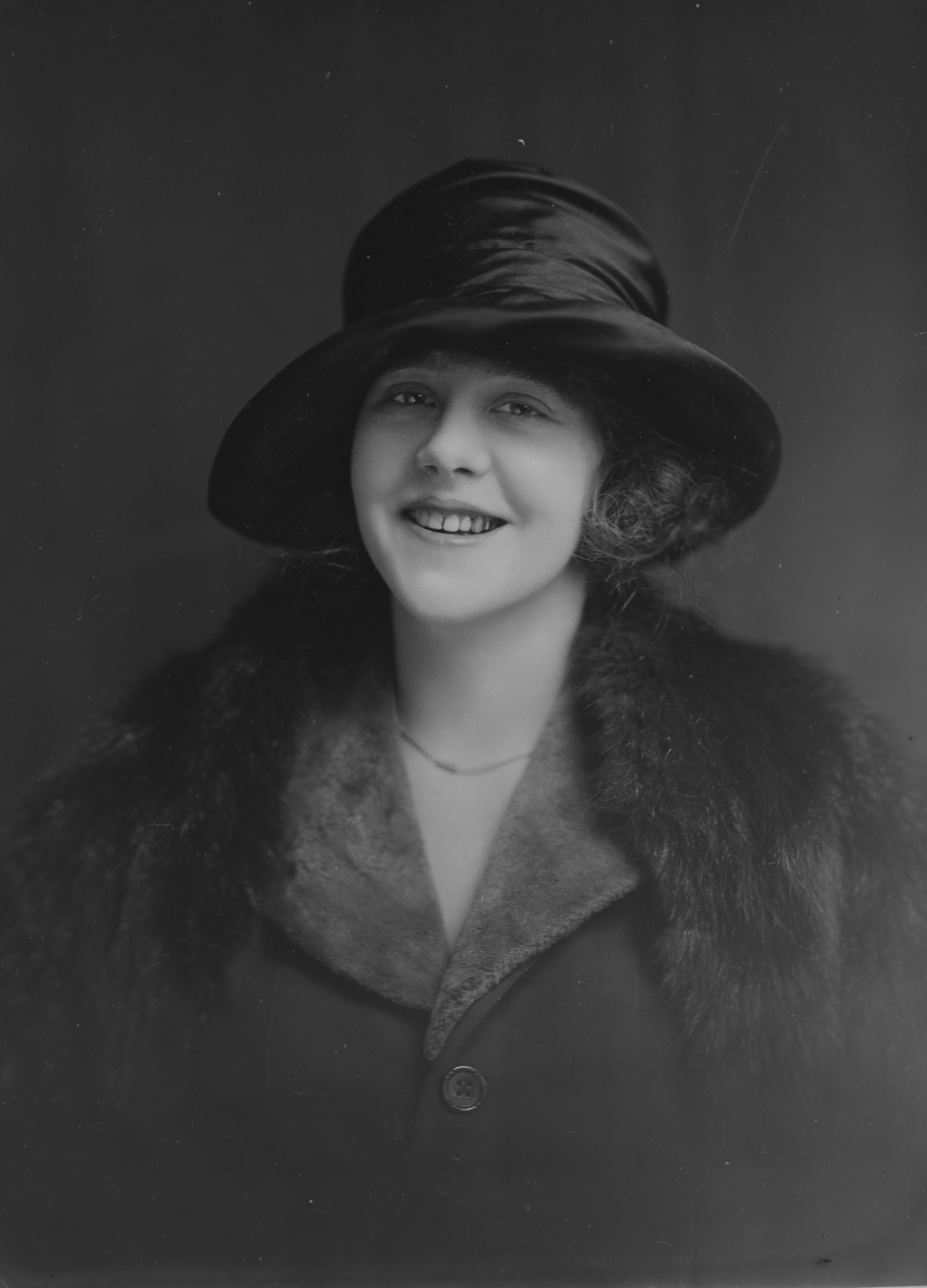
Mrs. J.B.N. Osborne (1919)

Following their engagement in May 1904, she married James Bunbury Nott Osborne (1878–1934) — who was, by that time, also a member of her theatrical company — in a quiet, private ceremony, on 25 October 1904, at Papani, New Zealand. It was Jeffries' first, and only marriage.

=== Bowylie ===
In March 1906, Jeffries retired from the stage and happily devoted herself to a rural life on their family property, "Bowylie", near Gundaroo, New South Wales.

The property was originally known as "Talligandra". The current homestead, originally known as "Stoneville", built by the Massy family following the destruction of the earlier building in a bushfire in the 1870s, was purchased by the Osborne family in 1896 and renamed "Bowylie". Whilst some aspects of the current gardens were designed by William Guilfoyle, "most of the credit for planning and beautifying the gardens must go to Mrs James Osborne, who arrived as a bride in 1904. Mrs Osborne planted the Lambertiana hedges, laid out paths and gardens and kept an eye on extensive additions to the house".

=== Children ===
On 2 February 1894, and far from the United States, and representing herself as "Bertha Jeffreys" from Tasmania, she gave birth to a daughter, Florence Beatrice Jeffreys (1894–1974) – later Mrs. George Frederick Seymour — in North Carlton, Victoria, Australia.

The child, whose father was never identified, was immediately "taken in" by Patrick Joseph and Harriet Ann Walsh, née Deverson, also of North Carlton, who ran a boarding house for actors. Although the existence of the child was kept secret from the world in general, her daughter always knew the identity of her mother — whom she met at least once as a child and, after whom, she later named her own daughter.

Her 1904 marriage produced two children: a son, James Bedford Jeffries Osborne (1908–1984), and a daughter, Elizabeth Osborne, born on 22 May 1911, who only lived for five weeks. Later that same year, when her three-year-old son contracted diphtheria, and was admitted to the isolation ward at Yass Hospital, a deeply worried Jeffries, although quite well herself, having already experienced the death of her mother (who had died in Memphis, on 4 January) and the death of her daughter (on 2 July), went into quarantine with her son, rather than be separated from him. After several weeks in the hospital, and with the care of his mother, he was well enough for them both to return home.

=== Picture postcards ===
A constant, and important ongoing source of income for Jeffries was that derived from the royalties from the sale of a wide range of popular photographic postcards of her either in the costume of a particular stage role — as Mercia in The Sign of the Cross, as Kate Cregeen in The Manxman, as Elna in Daughters of Babylon, as Mariamne in Herod; A Tragedy — or studio portraits representing her "off stage".

In 1904 it was reported that, even though payment was only six cents per copy, Jeffries had made at least $US10,000 from royalties in less than two years. Several years later, it was estimated that some 200,000 postcards of Jeffries had been sold in Sydney over the 1906 Christmas/New Year period alone.

=== Maud Jeffries: "The Tombstone Angel" ===
In early 1906 the London Daily Mail reported that one of the most popular postcards of Jeffries — portraying her in the role of Mercia in The Sign of the Cross — was being used as the model for the recently created "winged angel" that was rapidly replacing the "weeping angel" as the most popular item in memorial statuary.

In April, the Melbourne Age announced that "Miss Jeffries has instructed her London solicitors to announce that it is exceedingly distasteful to her to be associated with tombstones in any way, and the offending sculptors are being brought to book for the liberty they have taken"; and, soon, the following (humorous) paragraph was being widely circulated in the Australian press: "Miss Maud Jeffries denies, through her solicitors, that she has authorised the manufacture of marble reproductions of herself as tombstone angels. Her solicitors, nevertheless, write from Angel Court."

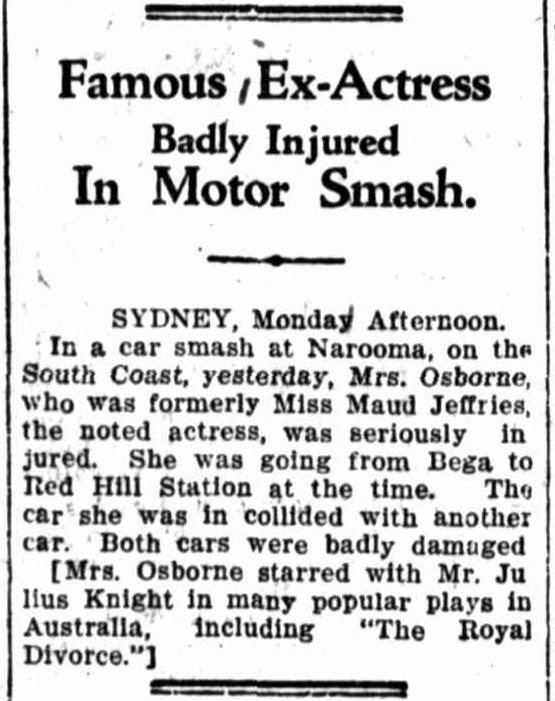
The Daily Standard, Brisbane (22 January 1929)

=== Chrysanthemum Maud Jeffries ===
Around 1906, G. Brunning and Sons, a plant nursery in St Kilda, Victoria, renowned for their chrysanthemum varieties, produced a cultivar — later described as "a decorative Japanese variety of the purest white, and one of the most valuable of these for late flowering and conservatory decoration" — which was officially named "Miss Maud Jeffries".

=== Not that Mrs. Osborne ===
On Sunday 20 January 1929, on the way to Redbank Station, Jugiong, near Harden, New South Wales, a motor car driven by a Mr. P. O'Rorke, crashed into an oncoming vehicle at the South Coast town of Narooma. The driver of the other vehicle, and O'Rorke's passenger, a "Mrs. Osborne", were badly injured and taken to hospital.

Given that the injured woman was a "Mrs. Osborne", from a property somewhere in rural New South Wales, it was immediately assumed that the woman was, indeed, Jeffries, and the news of the accident was widely broadcast in newspapers in Australia, New Zealand, the USA, Great Britain, and the British Colonies. Three days later, it was revealed that, rather than being the supposed "Mrs. J.B.N. Osborne" of Gundaroo, the accident victim was, in fact, Mrs. Elsie Evelyn Osborne (1878–1930), née Dickenson, of Redbank Station, Jugiong, NSW, the widow of Benjamin Marshall Osborne (thus "Mrs. B.M. Osborne").

=== Death ===
Maud Evelyn Craven Nott, née Jeffries, died of cancer, at her family property, "Bowylie", at Gundaroo, on 27 September 1946, aged 76 years. She was privately interred at Waverley Cemetery, Sydney, along with the remains of her daughter Elizabeth Osborne (1911–1911), and her late husband, James Bunbury Nott Osborne (1878–1934).

== See also ==
- Gundaroo Airport
- The Sign of the Cross
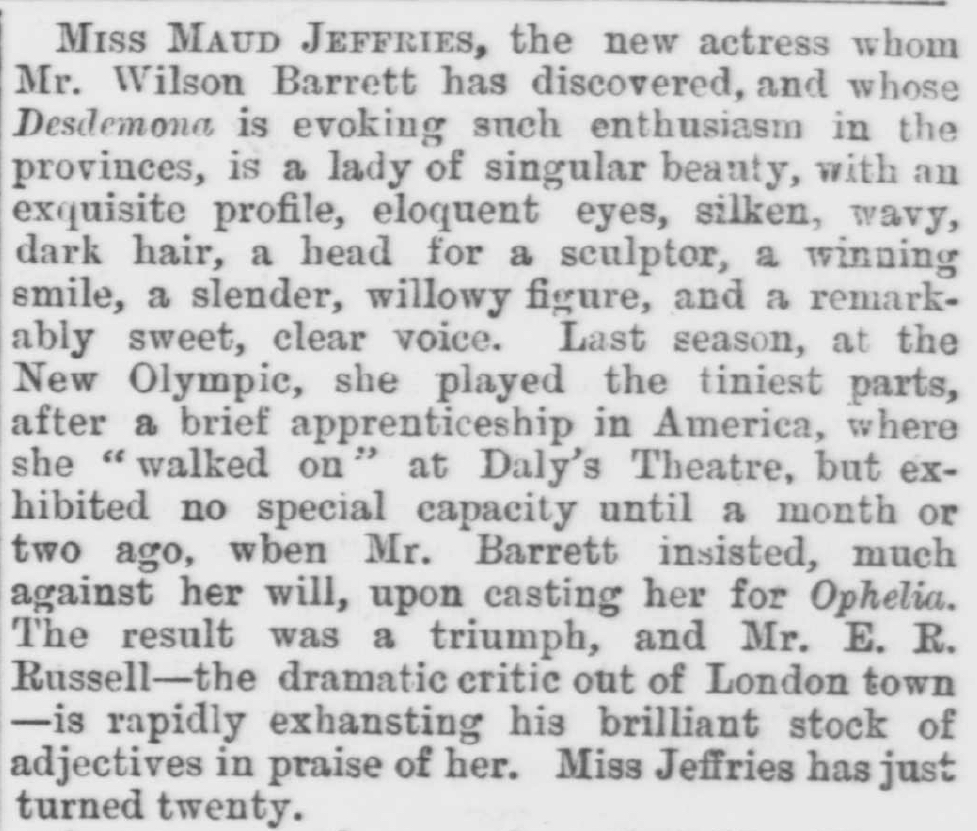
British press review (1891)

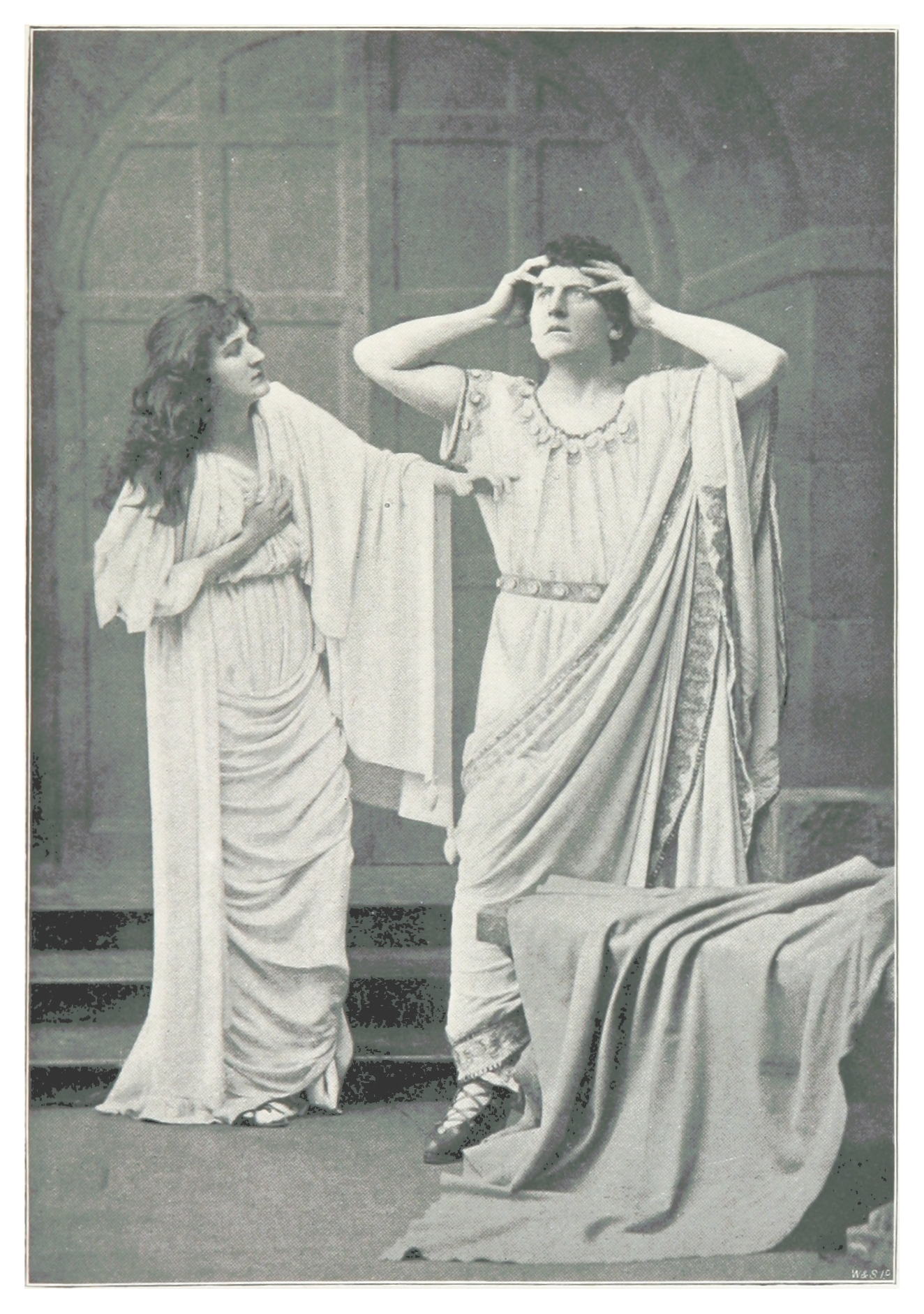
Maud Jeffries and Wilson Barrett: The Sign of the Cross (1895)

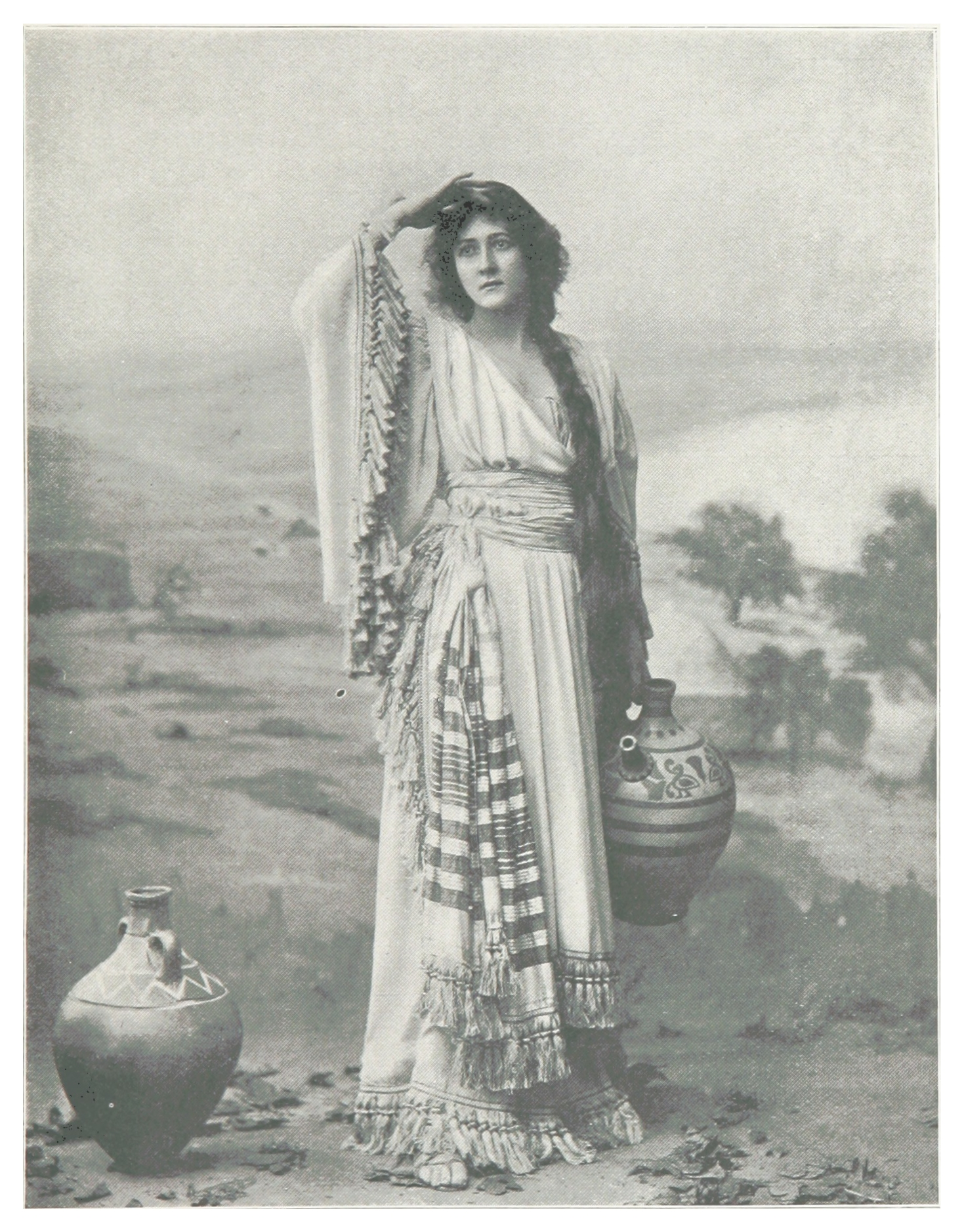
Maud Jeffries: The Sign of the Cross (1895)

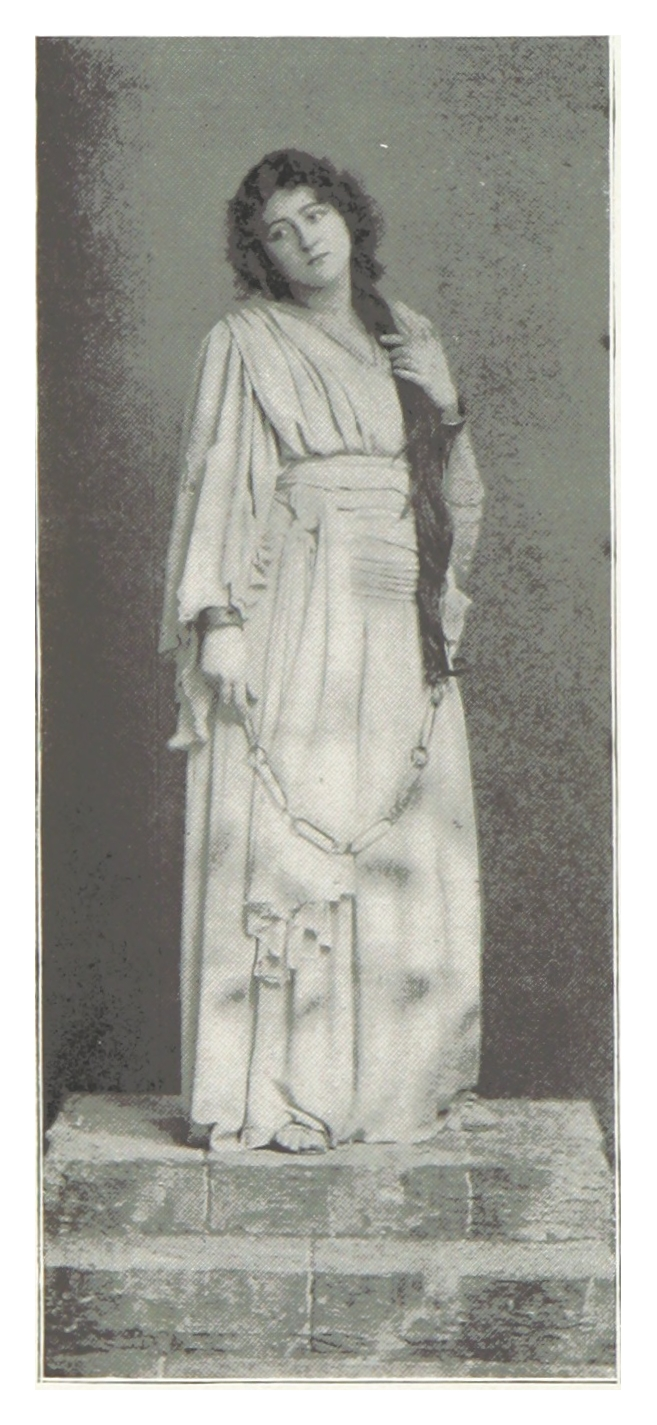
Maud Jeffries: The Sign of the Cross (1895)

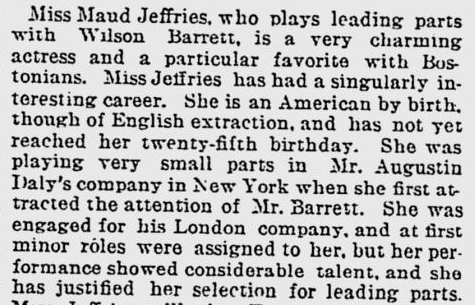
U.S. press review (1895)

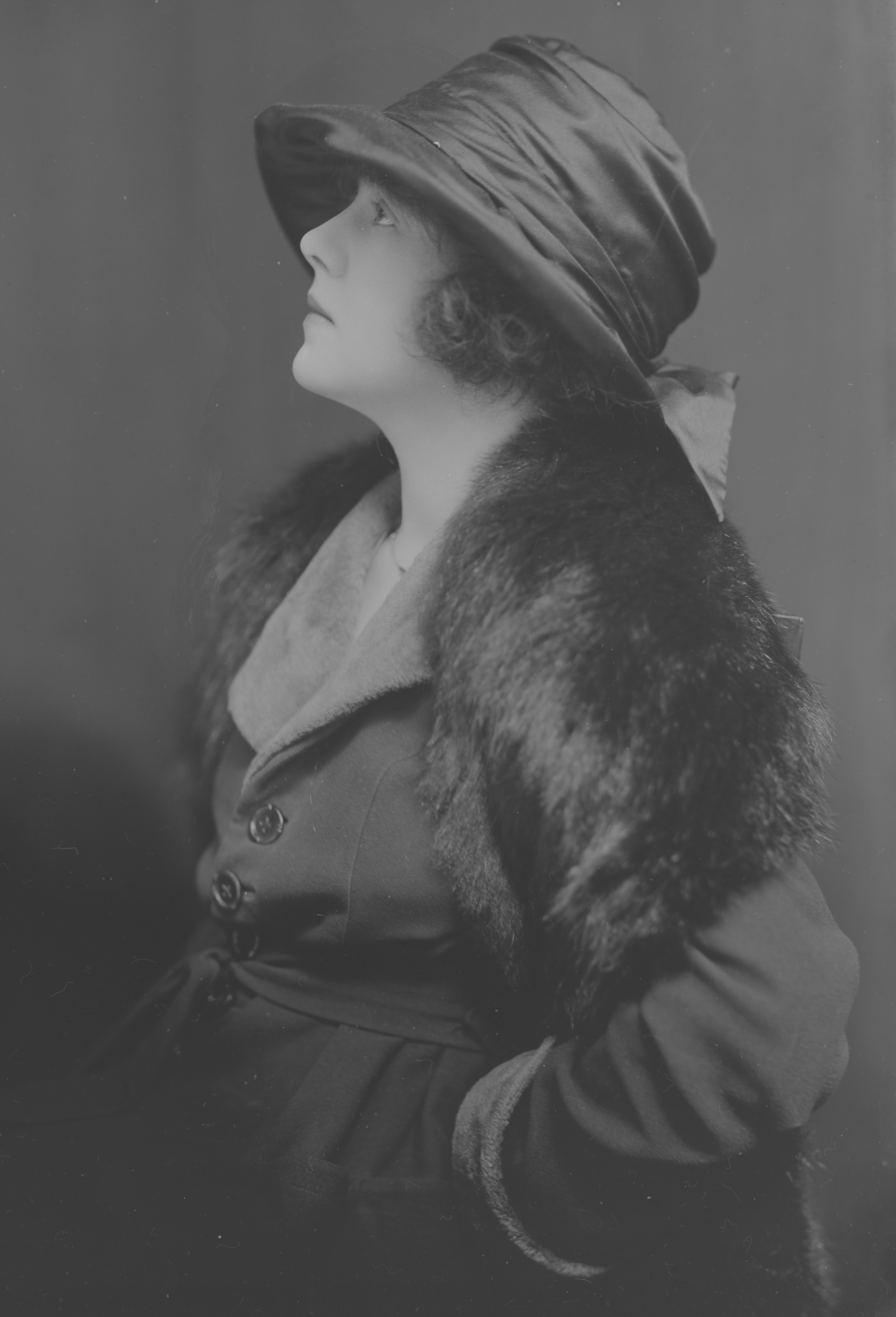
Mrs J.B.N. Osborne (1919)
