= Gundaroo Airport =

Airport in New South Wales, Australia

- IATA: none; ICAO: YGDO

Summary
- Airport type: Private
- Owner: Dick Smith Investments
- Location: Gundaroo, New South Wales
- Elevation AMSL: 1,860 ft / 564 m
- Coordinates: 35°02′42″S 149°15′30″E

Map
- Location of airport in New South Wales

Runways
Direction	Length		Surface
Direction	ft	m	Surface
18/36	3,590	1,094	Bitumen
09/27	1,373	418	Grass
- Sources: Australian AIP and aerodrome chart

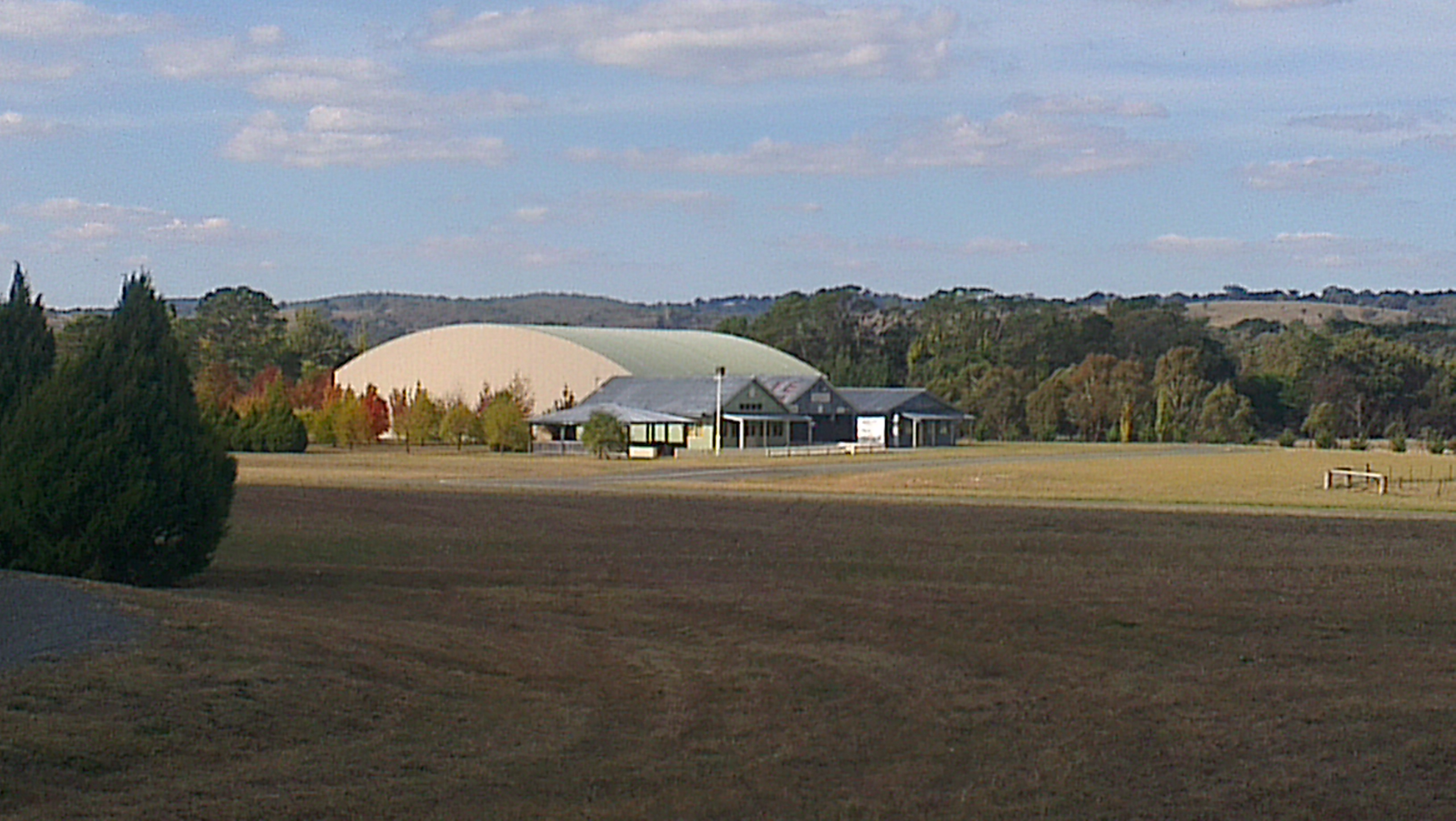
View across the airfield towards the Bowylie Flying Club

Gundaroo Airport (ICAO: YGDO) is a private airstrip located approximately 2 km (1.2 mi) south of the village of Gundaroo in the Southern Tablelands region of New South Wales, Australia. The airport is on the grounds of "Talagandra Station", on which is the historic "Bowylie Homestead", once the home of American actress Maud Jeffries and now the country estate of high-profile Australian aviator and entrepreneur Dick Smith. The airfield is home to the Bowylie Flying Club, a museum collection of aviation memorabilia and amateur radio equipment. The airside facilities are linked to the private homestead by a 2 foot (610 mm) minimum-gauge railway which intersects the taxiway, requiring aircraft to give way to trains. The airfield may be available to the public by prior arrangement and has been a destination for aero clubs. The airfield has hosted a bi-annual rally for large scale model aircraft. This event attracts participants from clubs across Australia.

== See also ==
- List of airports in New South Wales
