= The Sign of the Cross (1914 film) =

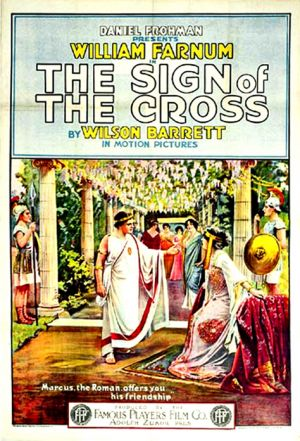
- Theatrical release poster
- Directed by: Frederick A. Thomson
- Based on: The Sign of the Cross by Wilson Barrett
- Starring: William Farnum; Rosina Henley; Sheridan Block; Morgan Thorpe; Ethel Grey Terry; Lila Barclay; George Majeroni
- Cinematography: Herbert J. Siddons
- Production company: Famous Players Film Company
- Distributed by: Paramount Pictures
- Release date: December 21, 1914
- Running time: 70 minutes
- Country: United States
- Language: Silent. English intertitles

The Sign of the Cross is a 1914 American drama silent film directed by Frederick A. Thomson based on the 1895 play by Wilson Barrett. The film stars William Farnum, Rosina Henley, Sheridan Block, Morgan Thorpe, Ethel Grey Terry, Lila Barclay and George Majeroni. The film was released on December 21, 1914, by Paramount Pictures.

== Plot ==
Rome, 64 A.D. When the emperor Nero renews the persecutions against Christians, the prefect Marco Superbo fears for the life of Mercia, a Christian with whom he is in love. The woman, however, is arrested and the emperor refuses to pardon her unless she renounces her faith. Mercia not only rejects the offer that is communicated to her by Marco but, before entering the arena, also converts Marco who, together with her, faces death.

== Cast ==
- William Farnum as Marcus Superbus
- Rosina Henley as Mercia
- Sheridan Block as Nero
- Morgan Thorpe as Favius
- Ethel Grey Terry as Berenice
- Lila Barclay as Poppaea
- George Majeroni as Tigellinus
- Ogden Childe as Stephanus
- Ethel Phillips as Dacia
- Charles E. Vernon as Glabrio
- Rienzi De Cordova as Philodemus

== See also ==
- The Sign of the Cross (1932 film)
- The Sign of the Cross (1895 play)
