= Wilson Barrett =

English manager, actor and playwright (1846–1904)

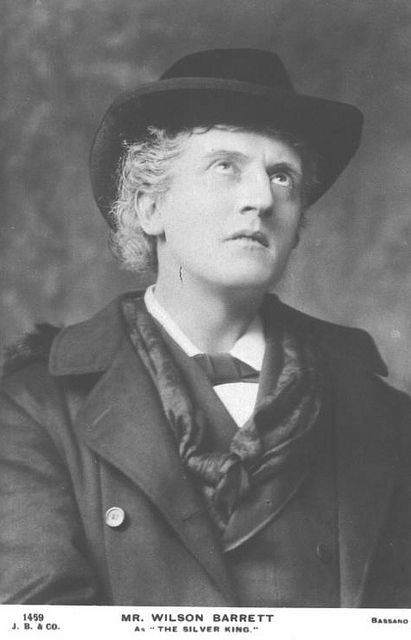
- Born: William Henry Barrett; 18 February 1846; Essex, England
- Died: 22 July 1904 (aged 58); London, England
- Occupations: Actor-manager, actor, playwright
- Spouse: Caroline Heath (m. 1866)

Wilson Barrett (born William Henry Barrett; 18 February 1846 – 22 July 1904) was an English manager, actor, and playwright. With his company, Barrett is credited with attracting the largest crowds of English theatregoers ever because of his success with melodrama, an instance being his production of The Silver King (1882) at the Princess's Theatre of London. The historical tragedy The Sign of the Cross (1895) was Barrett's most successful play, both in England and in the United States.

== Biography ==
=== 1880s ===
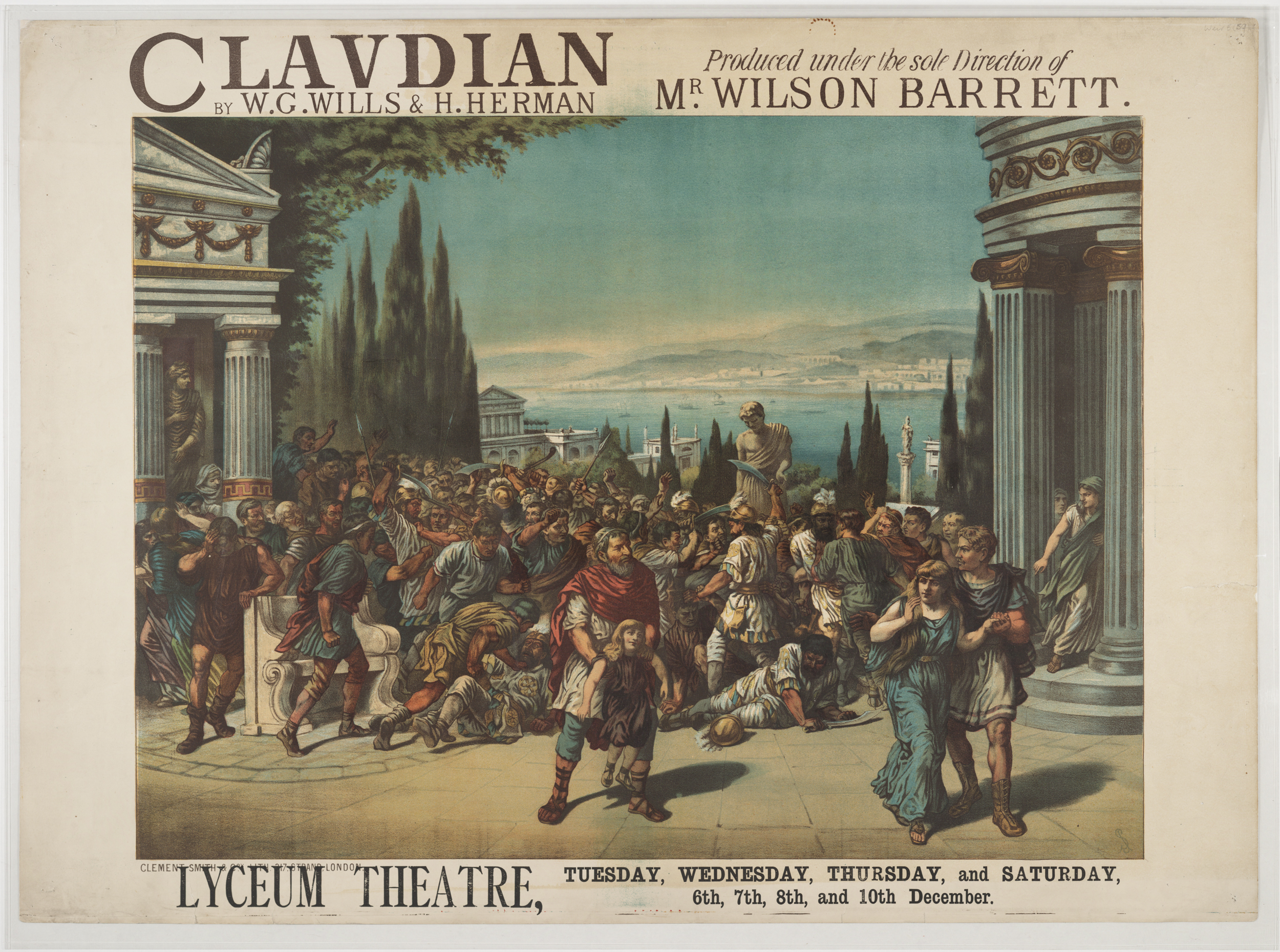
Barrett's production of Claudian at the Royal Lyceum Theatre, Edinburgh

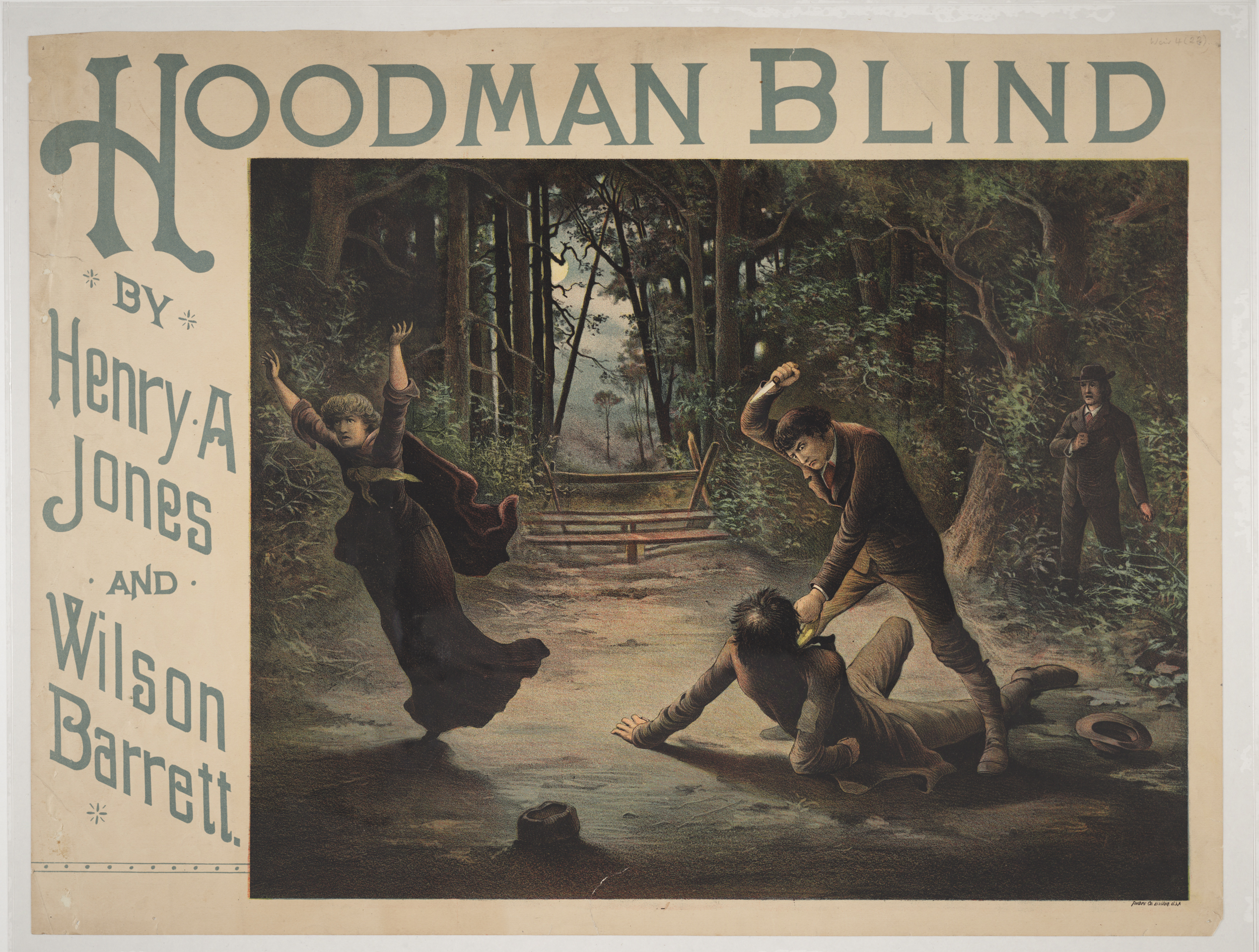
Poster for Hoodman blind

Barrett was born into a farming family in Essex. He is remembered as an actor of handsome appearance (despite his small stature) and with a powerful voice. He made his first appearance on the stage at Halifax in 1864, and then played in the provinces alone and with his wife, Caroline Heath, in East Lynne. They married in 1866, having two sons, Frank and Alfred, and three daughters, Ellen, Katherine and Dorothea (Dollie).

Barrett capitalized on his early success as an actor to start a career as a producer. After managerial experience at the Grand Theatre Leeds and elsewhere, in 1879 he took over the management of the Old Court theatre, where in the following year he introduced Madame Helena Modjeska to London in an adaptation of Maria Stuart (by Schiller), together with productions of Adrienne Lecouvreur, La Dame aux camélias and other plays.

In 1881, Wilson Barrett took over the recently refurbished Princess's Theatre, where his melodramatic productions enjoyed great success (if not quite as much as before), with attendance being the highest ever for this theatre. There Barrett presented The Lights o' London, and then The Silver King, regarded as the most successful melodrama of the 19th century in England. It debuted on 16 November 1882, with Barrett as Wilfred Denver. He played this part for three hundred nights without a break, and repeated its success in W. G. Wills's Claudian.

In 1885 he and Henry Arthur Jones produced Hoodman Blind and in 1886 co-operated with Clement Scott in Sister Mary. In 1886 Barrett left the Princess's Theatre, and in this same year he made a visit to America, repeated in later years.

In 1884 Barrett had appeared in Hamlet, only to promptly return to melodrama. He was not to find much success in any Shakespearian role, apart from Mercutio in Romeo and Juliet.

Though Barrett had occasional seasons in London he acted chiefly in the provinces, with his company being one of the most successful of the decade, receiving a £2,000 average yearly profit just from the Grand Theatre Leeds. His brother and his nephew were part of the company, and his grandson would join them eventually.

Barrett was the producer of the performance of The Romany Rye which on its opening night turned into the Exeter Theatre Royal fire, which was the deadliest theatre incident in UK history, killing 186 people.

=== 1890s: The Sign of the Cross ===
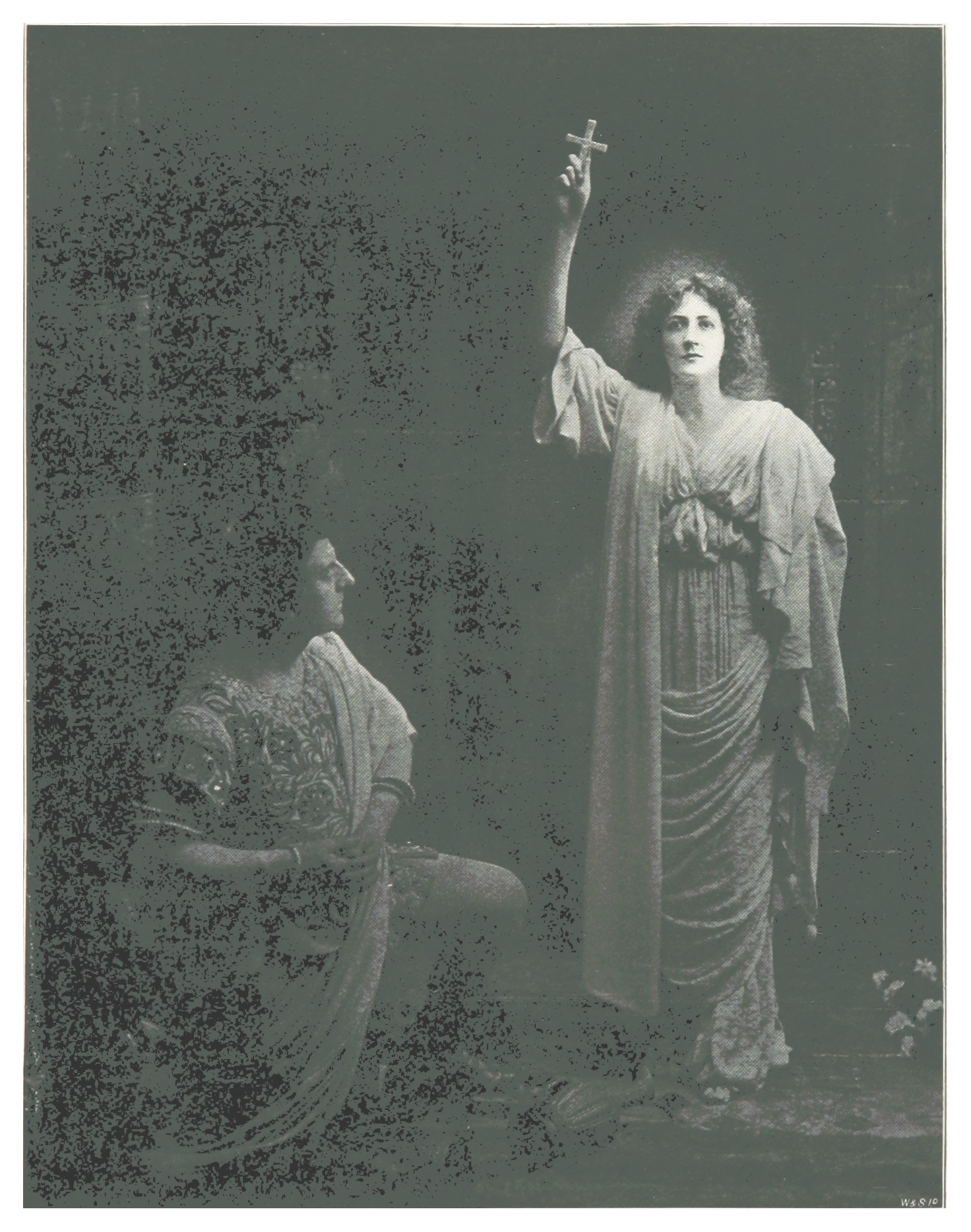
Wilson Barrett and Maud Jeffries: The Sign of the Cross (1895)

By the 1890s, the London stage was already coming under new influences, and Wilson Barrett's vogue in melodrama had waned, leaving him in financial difficulties. From 1894 he toured the United States, including the American and Knickerbocker theatres of Broadway.

Still there in 1895, Barrett found fortune again with a production which would effectively become his most successful, the historical tragedy The Sign of the Cross—which was originally produced in the United States at the Grand Opera House, St. Louis, Missouri on 28 March 1895; in the United Kingdom, at the Grand Theatre, Leeds, on 26 August 1895; in London, at the Lyric Theatre, London on 4 January 1896; and in Australia, at Her Majesty's Theatre, Sydney on 8 May 1897—in which Barrett played Marcus Superbus, an old Roman patrician of the years of Nero, who falls in love with a young woman, Mercia (originally played by Maud Jeffries) and converts to Christianity for her, both sacrificing their lives in the arena to the lions. The plot in some ways strongly resembles the contemporary novel Quo Vadis, whose initial publication as a part-work took place during the months after the play premiered.

The theatre was crowded with audiences largely composed of people outside the ordinary circle of playgoers, shepherded by enthusiastic local clergymen. Barrett tried to repeat this success with more plays of a religious type, though not with equal effect, and several of his later attempts were failures.

At the turn of the century he co-founded the company which became Waddingtons, originally as a theatre-focused printing firm.

=== Death ===
Wilson Barrett died in a nursing home in London on 22 July 1904. Thanks largely to the success of the Sign of the Cross, he left £57,000, even after periods of relative failure, mainly during his later years managing the Old Court Theatre. His grandson, also named Wilson Barrett, became an actor director with the Brandon-Thomas Company before starting his own repertory in 1939, the Wilson Barrett Company, which based itself in Edinburgh's Lyceum, Glasgow at the Alhambra Theatre Glasgow and for a time in Aberdeen. It also performed on television, at the Edinburgh International Festival and, by invitation, in South Africa. The company was retired in 1954.

=== Archives ===
Barrett's descendants placed the majority of Wilson Barrett's papers at the Harry Ransom Center at the University of Texas at Austin. Over thirty boxes of materials include manuscript works by Barrett, business and personal correspondence, extensive financial records and legal agreements, as well as photographs, playbills and programs relating to Barrett's productions, and Barrett and Heath family papers. Additional Wilson Barrett materials at the Ransom Center include letters by Barrett located in the literary manuscript collections of Richard Le Gallienne, John Ruskin, William Winter, and Robert Lee Wolff. The B. J. Simmons Co. costume design records include the company's renderings for The Sign of the Cross. A marked script of Barrett's The Manxman can be found in the Playscripts and Promptbooks Collection.

The British Library, the Folger Shakespeare Library, and the University of Leeds Special Collections Library each have a substantial number of letters by Wilson Barrett. The Victoria & Albert Museum Theatre and Performance Archives holds designs by Edward William Godwin for Barrett's productions of Juana, Claudian, Hamlet, Junius, and Clito. The papers of Wilson Barrett the younger (1900-1981), a grandson of Wilson Barrett who was also an actor-manager and toured with his own Wilson Barrett Company, are located in the Scottish Theatre Archive at the University of Glasgow.

== Works ==
=== Theatre management ===
- Grand Theatre Leeds, 1878-1895
- Old Court theatre, 1879
- Princess's Theatre, 1881–1886
- Olympic Theatre (London), 1890–1891.

=== Playwright ===
- Sister Mary (1880s)
- Hoodman Blind (1885), with Henry Arthur Jones
- Good Old Times (1889), with Hall Caine
- Ben-My-Chree (1889), an adaptation of Hall Caine's The Deemster, with Caine
- Clito, with Sydney Grundy
- The Manxman (1894), an adaptation of Hall Caine's novel
- Romany Rye
- The Sign of the Cross (1895)
- Lucky Durham

==== Later adaptations ====
In 1932, Cecil B. DeMille produced and directed a highly successful film version of The Sign of the Cross, starring Fredric March as centurion Marcus Superbus, Claudette Colbert as Poppea, Charles Laughton as Nero, and Elissa Landi as Mercia, the Christian woman with whom Marcus falls in love.

=== Acting ===
- The Silver King (1882)
- Hamlet, Romeo and Juliet, Othello
- The Sign of the Cross (1895)
- Claudian, Ben-My-Chree, Virginius, The Manxman (1898)
