= The Sign of the Cross (1932 film) =

1932 film

- Theatrical release poster
- Directed by: Cecil B. DeMille
- Screenplay by: Waldemar Young; Sidney Buchman
- Based on: The Sign of the Cross (1895 play) by Wilson Barrett
- Produced by: Cecil B. DeMille
- Starring: Fredric March; Elissa Landi; Claudette Colbert; Charles Laughton
- Cinematography: Karl Struss
- Edited by: Anne Bauchens
- Music by: Rudolph G. Kopp
- Production company: Paramount Pictures
- Distributed by: Paramount Pictures
- Release dates: November 30, 1932 (New York City); December 25, 1932 (Los Angeles)
- Running time: 125 minutes
- Country: United States
- Language: English
- Budget: $694,065
- Box office: $2,738,993

Trailer for the 1944 re-release

The Sign of the Cross is a 1932 American pre-Code epic historical drama film produced and directed by Cecil B. DeMille, and released by Paramount Pictures. Based on the original 1895 play by English playwright Wilson Barrett, the screenplay was written by Waldemar Young and Sidney Buchman. It stars Fredric March, Elissa Landi, Claudette Colbert, and Charles Laughton, with Ian Keith and Arthur Hohl.

This film is the third and last in DeMille's biblical trilogy, following The Ten Commandments (1923) and The King of Kings (1927). Both play and film have a strong resemblance to the 1895–96 novel Quo Vadis and, like the novel, take place in ancient Rome during the reign of Nero. The art direction and costume design were by Mitchell Leisen, who also acted as assistant director.

The Sign of the Cross premiered on November 30, 1932, and was a financial hit. Karl Struss was nominated for Best Cinematography at the 6th Academy Awards. As a published work from 1932, the film will enter the American public domain on January 1, 2028.

== Plot ==
During the Great Fire of Rome in AD 64, Emperor Nero "fiddles". Tigellinus informs Nero that he is suspected of starting the fire. Nero instead has the fire blamed on the Christians. In Rome, the Apostle Titus, Mercia, and Favius are apprehended by a mob for being Christians. Marcus Superbus, the prefect of Rome, arrives and disperses the mob, allowing the Christians to go free.

News of Marcus's mercy towards the Christians spreads throughout Rome, including to Empress Poppaea. At a fountain, Marcus meets with Mercia again; there, Licinius reads Nero's edict to Marcus reminding him of his duty to arrest Christians. Later that night, Titus sends Stephan, a young Christian man, to tell other Christians of the secret meeting at the Cestian Bridge. Shortly after, Marcus arrives at Mercia's home wanting to take her for himself, but Mercia decides to stay. Stephan is arrested by Licinius under suspicion of being a Christian. In a dungeon, under torture Stephan reveals the location of the Christians' secret meeting.

After learning of Stephan's arrest and torture, Marcus races to the meeting hoping to save Mercia. Along the way, he crashes into Poppaea's carriage. She demands Marcus stay, but he leaves her and promises to be with her in the morning. At the meeting, Roman soldiers surround the Christians, and Titus and some members of his congregation are struck dead by arrows. Marcus arrives at the meeting and saves Mercia, and takes her home, while the other Christians are arrested and imprisoned.

The next morning, Poppaea scolds Marcus for his affections to Mercia. Elsewhere in the palace, Tigellinus informs Nero of Marcus's disobedience to his edict. Nero accuses Marcus of betrayal. Jealous of Mercia, Poppaea influences Nero to sign an order for Mercia's arrest. At a feast in Marcus's home, he introduces Mercia to Ancaria, who performs an exotic dance. Outside, Ancaria's performance is drowned out by the Christians' singing. Annoyed by the singing, Marcus sends his party away so he may be alone with Mercia. He tries to get Mercia to renounce her Christian faith so she may be with him, but she refuses. Shortly after, Licinius arrives to arrest Mercia, who is to be executed for treason amongst one hundred Christians in the arena.

Marcus returns to Nero's palace and demands that the emperor spare Mercia, but Nero refuses. In the arena, the audience is entertained by several spectacles, including gladiator battles. When the time for the Christians' execution arrives, Mercia is told to stay behind by Poppaea's orders, as she is to be executed alone. In the arena, the Christians are mauled to death by lions. Following the execution, Marcus again asks for Mercia to renounce her faith and be his wife. Mercia refuses once more, but she states that she loves him. Refusing to live without her, Marcus accompanies Mercia, and they are both executed.

== Cast ==
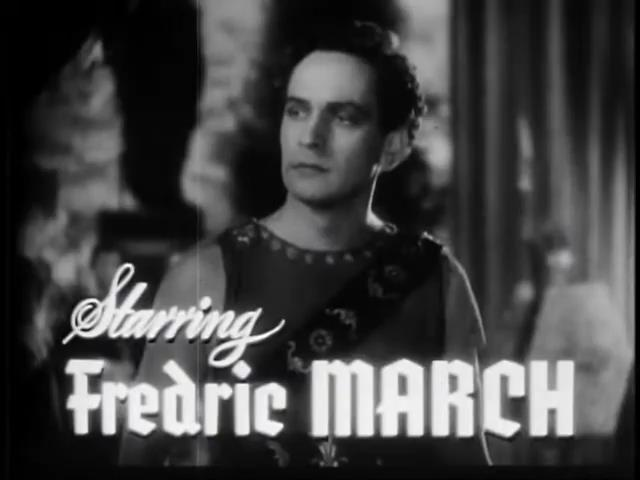
Fredric March

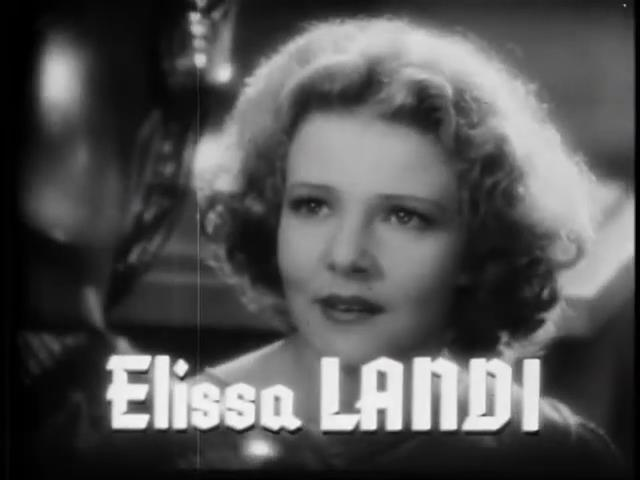
Elissa Landi

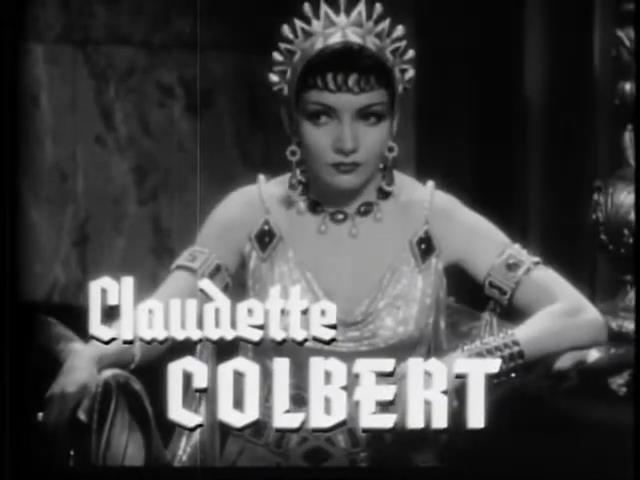
Claudette Colbert

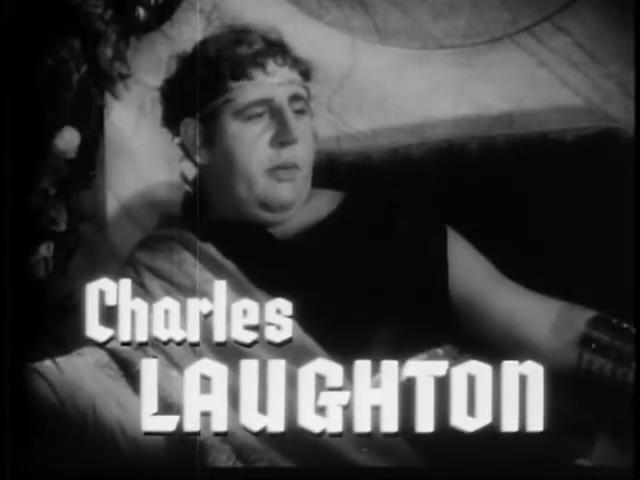
Charles Laughton

- Fredric March as Marcus Superbus, prefect of Rome
- Elissa Landi as Mercia
- Claudette Colbert as Empress Poppaea
- Charles Laughton as Emperor Nero
- Ian Keith as Tigellinus
- Arthur Hohl as Titus
- Harry Beresford as Favius Fontellus
- Tommy Conlon as Stephan
- Ferdinand Gottschalk as Glabrio
- Vivian Tobin as Dacia
- William V. Mong as Licinius
- Joyzelle Joyner as Ancaria
- Richard Alexander as Viturius
- Nat Pendleton as Strabo
- Clarence Burton as Servillius
- Harold Healy as Tybul
- Robert Manning as Philodemus
- Charles Middleton as Tyros

Uncredited

- Mischa Auer as Christian in Dungeon
- Lionel Belmore as Bettor
- Henry Brandon as Spectator
- Edward LeSaint as Spectator

== Production ==
=== Development ===
In 1931, when his three-picture contract with Metro-Goldwyn-Mayer ended, producer-director Cecil B. DeMille found that he could "not get a job in Hollywood." His recent film, The Squaw Man (1931), was a box-office failure due to the Great Depression, and Hollywood studio executives were showing a "profound lack of interest in the obviously washed-up deMille". DeMille was vacationing in New York when he began planning his next production: a film adaptation of a play he had seen before, The Sign of the Cross by Wilson Barrett. It was something he wanted to do and it would also complete the "trilogy of religious dramas" he had started with his previous biblical epics, The Ten Commandments (1923) and The King of Kings (1927). DeMille saw The Ten Commandments as the giving of the Law, The King of Kings as the interpretation of the Law, and The Sign of the Cross as the preservation of the Law. Adolph Zukor, one of the founders of Famous Players–Lasky, had made a silent version of the play in 1914, but by the early 1930s Mary Pickford owned the film rights. DeMille went to England and encountered people who wanted to make films with him and liked the idea of The Sign of the Cross, but these plans fell through because they could not get a guarantee from an American film distributor.

By the time DeMille returned to Famous Players–Lasky, the studio had changed its name to Paramount-Publix and had moved to a new location on Melrose Avenue. In early 1932, Neil S. McCarthy and Paramount executive B. P. Schulberg negotiated a one-picture contract for DeMille so he could make The Sign of the Cross at Paramount. Waldemar Young and Sidney Buchman worked on the script. Schulberg was soon succeeded as Paramount's studio head by Emmanuel Cohen, who said to DeMille, "Remember, Cecil, you are on trial with this picture." At first, DeMille was only allowed to bring Mitchell Leisen and Roy Burns with him to Paramount, but eventually secretary Florence Cole and editor Anne Bauchens rejoined his studio staff.

By June 1932, DeMille had spent 10 months preparing for the film, which he had been trying to produce for the past 12 years. With an estimated budget close to $1,000,000, DeMille expected to film it in eight to 10 weeks, beginning in July.

=== Casting ===
In London, DeMille saw Charles Laughton in the play Payment Deferred: "I knew that I had found the only man to play Nero if I ever achieved my dream of making The Sign of the Cross. […] I saw in Charles Laughton the incredibly wide range of talent which makes every role he plays seem as if it had been tailored just for him."

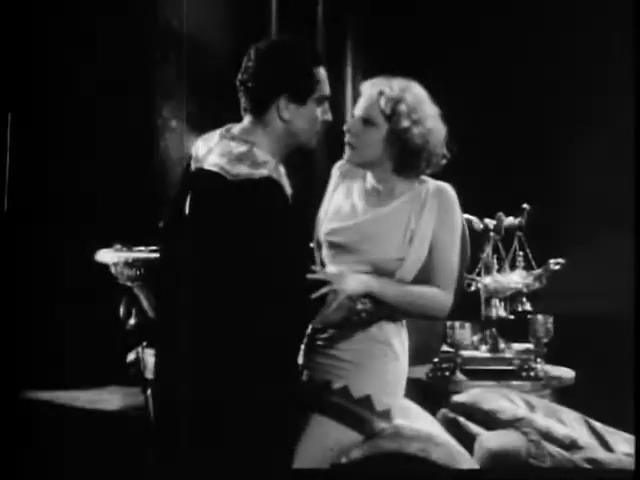
Fredric March and Elissa Landi

DeMille tried to borrow George Brent from Warner Bros. for the role of Marcus, but Brent was in demand at Warners and would not be available to play the part. DeMille then chose Fredric March on June 7, 1932.

In early June, columnist Louella Parsons wrote that DeMille "was never one who moves rapidly. He chooses his players with infinite care." In mid-June, RKO contract player Ann Harding was said to be DeMille's leading choice for the role of Mercia, but she could only play the part if her studio was willing to loan her to Paramount. Several days later, DeMille and Paramount were trying to borrow newcomer Ann Dvorak, under contract to Howard Hughes, for "one of the most coveted roles in Hollywood at the moment." DeMille, in his search for a young woman who could combine "spirituality and physical allure", looked at more than 500 applicants. At one point, he chose Sylvia Sidney. After screen-testing dozens of blond actresses, DeMille borrowed Elissa Landi from Fox on June 30. He said he chose Landi because she "combines mysticism and sex [appeal] with the pure and wholesome, and has the depth of the ages in her eyes, today in her body and tomorrow in her spirit." Landi was the third star to be cast.

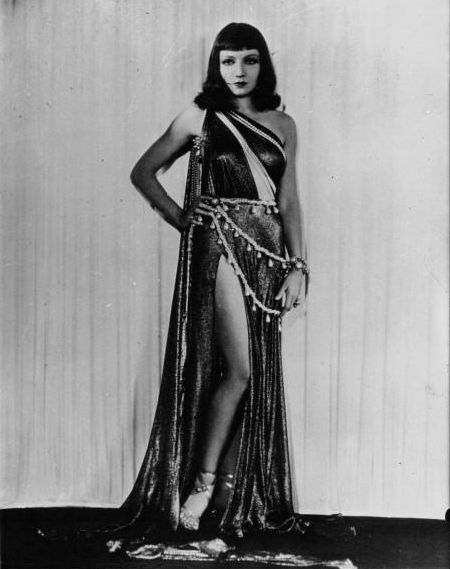
DeMille viewed Poppaea as "wickedness cloaked with beauty". Claudette Colbert won the role after she rehearsed a scene with Fredric March and said, "I love you!"

For the role of Nero's wife, Poppaea, DeMille wanted an actress who personified "wickedness cloaked with beauty". He considered silent film stars Pola Negri and Norma Talmadge, but found them unsuitable. In his autobiography, DeMille said he thought of Claudette Colbert, an actress "Paramount had been using in a succession of fluffy, light-headed roles which, I felt, did not give scope enough to the talent she had." He saw her on the Paramount lot one day and asked her, "Claudette, how would you like to play the wickedest woman in the world?" She replied, "I'd love it!" Colbert later recalled, "I'd been in kind of a rut playing nice, long‐suffering heroines. I was bored with those roles, but because I happened to look like a lady, that's all they wanted me to play. Working with DeMille opened up a whole other field; they realized I could look sexy." DeMille decided to schedule a screen test with Colbert before he signed her for the part; he gave her a page of a scene between Marcus and Poppaea and told her to study it. On the day of the test, DeMille saw her in costume and thought "there was no doubt that she fitted the part visually." Colbert and March rehearsed the scene before DeMille filmed the screen test:

I asked the empress and the upstanding, noble Roman soldier to run through the lines once before we turned the camera for Claudette's test. It was the shortest dialogue test on record. Between them they spoke only five words of the script before I called a halt. It ran like this:

March: "You harlot!"
Colbert: "I love you!"
DeMille: "That's enough. There's no need for a test. You have the part, Claudette."

In late July, Broadway stage actress Vivian Tobin was given the supporting role of Dacia. A friend of Tobin's took her to Paramount, where DeMille saw her, asked her to take a screen test, and signed her for the part five minutes later.

=== Art direction and set design ===
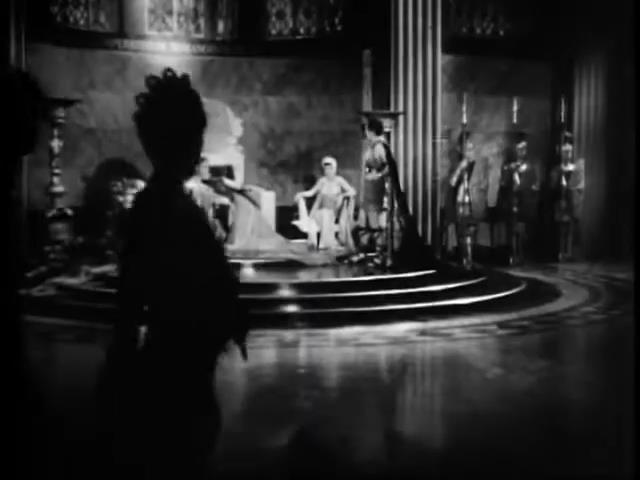
Nero's throne room

Set designers Harold Miles and Julian Harrison drew sketches of Nero's court, his throne room, and the doors and stairs to the arena. 400 artisans worked for four months constructing the sets for The Sign of the Cross. The full-scale sets included the Roman arena, the grove of Sylvanus, the Roman street Via Severus, Poppaea's marble bath, Marcus' palatial house, Dacia's banquet hall, Nero's court, Nero's throne room, and the dungeons. For the Great Fire of Rome scene, studio workers spent three weeks constructing replicas of ancient Rome at the Paramount ranch, located 30 miles from Hollywood.

=== Costumes ===
The film's ancient Roman costumes required 27 miles of silk, cotton, wool, and linen; 300 cutters and seamstresses worked on them over a period of several weeks. 7,000 extras had to be costumed with the same number of pairs of leather sandals, wide leather belts, leather leggings, arm bands, and leather chest protectors. Paramount installed a jewelry shop on the studio lot and hired designers and goldsmiths to create ancient Roman jewelry props. These props included ornaments made of brass, bronze, silver, and gold, depending on the character's station, with a laurel leaf or a lion head design. 4,000 wigs were made, and 450 extras playing soldiers were outfitted with helmets, swords, spears, sandals, leather shin guards, cuirasses, and arm bands. Fredric March's breastplate and brass chain mail weighed a total of 75 pounds.

=== Filming ===
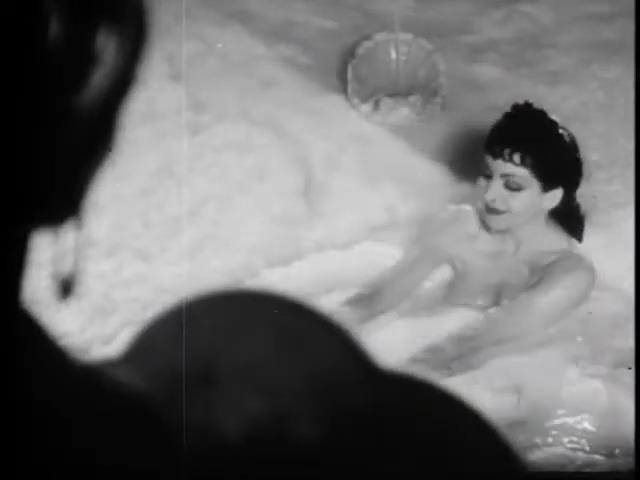
Claudette Colbert's famous bath scene

The famous scene in which Poppaea (Claudette Colbert) bathes in asses' milk took several days to shoot. DeMille announced to the press that real asses' milk was used; however, it was actually Klim, a brand of powdered cow's milk. After a few days under the hot lights, the milk turned sour, making it very unpleasant for Colbert to work in the stench. According to Colbert, studio technicians heated the milk so she would not get cold, but after eight hours of takes, she lost four pounds, her lacquered wig melted, and the hot milk turned to curds. She spent an entire day filming the scene: "I was in the pool all day. The Klim was so warm my bangs came uncurled. When the electricians turned off all the hot lights for an hour it congealed and the Klim turned to cream cheese." Colbert later remembered, "It was really quite funny. But you didn't make any jokes with C. B. To him, it was important that everything be absolutely correct. He was very serious about giving the public what it wanted."

Fredric March said that Colbert "was a hot woman in [the film]—a hot, hot woman! When she worked herself up, she put Monroe, Harlow, Gardner, Novak, all of them in the shade."

To save production expense during the Great Depression, existing sets were reused as well as costumes left over from the making of The Ten Commandments (1923).

In his autobiography, DeMille described the controversial scene where Marcus tries to seduce Mercia by making her sit through a Roman orgy: "She is proof against all the enticement of it. Then, as a last resort, a dance is performed before her by one of Marcus' wanton guests. It is an alluring dance. Dramatically, it had to be, to bring out by contrast the greater strength and purity of Mercia's faith. But some thought it too alluring."

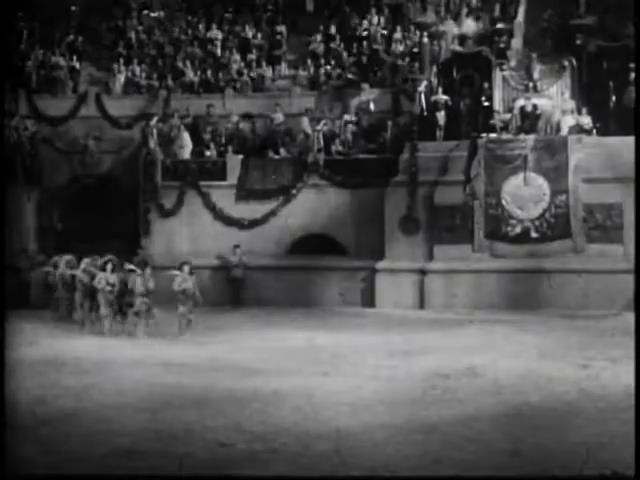
The Roman arena

DeMille also wrote that the elephants hired for an arena scene remembered their circus training when they heard the clapping and cheering of the Roman spectators, which caused the elephants to stand on their heads. Later, the entire herd of elephants suddenly stampeded and a female elephant carrying an actor named Bob Miles put him on the ground and stood over him until the other elephants were corralled. DeMille said, "If that one elephant had not had presence of mind or protective instinct or whatever it was that made her a nonconformist among the herd, nothing could have saved Bob Miles from being trampled to death. I kissed the elephant. She was a grand lady." For one of the dungeon scenes, DeMille wanted the lions to go up the stairs and into the arena, but the lions did not want to move. He made them go up the stairs after he grabbed a chair and an ax-handle and got closer to them. DeMille also attempted to provide out-of-work actors jobs as extras such as the crowd arena scenes.

== Marketing and distribution ==
Paramount marketed the film using market segmentation by focusing their promotion efforts on three market segments. The first was general moviegoers and movie enthusiasts who enjoyed certain features of religiously themed movies, movie goers who regularly attended church, and students of primary and elementary schools.

== Reception ==
Mordaunt Hall of The New York Times opined that Cecil B. DeMille's The Sign of the Cross "is an infinitely better told story than any of this director's previous spectacles. It has the benefit of drama and it is greatly enhanced by Charles Laughton's immensely interesting interpretation of Nero. Also the portrayals of the other players, including performers in subordinate rôles, are far superior to those in the De Millean silent productions."

In 2008, the film was nominated for the American Film Institute's 10 Top 10 in the Epic Film category. On Rotten Tomatoes, the film holds a rating of 80% from 25 reviews.

== Post-Production Code ==
=== Editing for reissue after enforcement ===
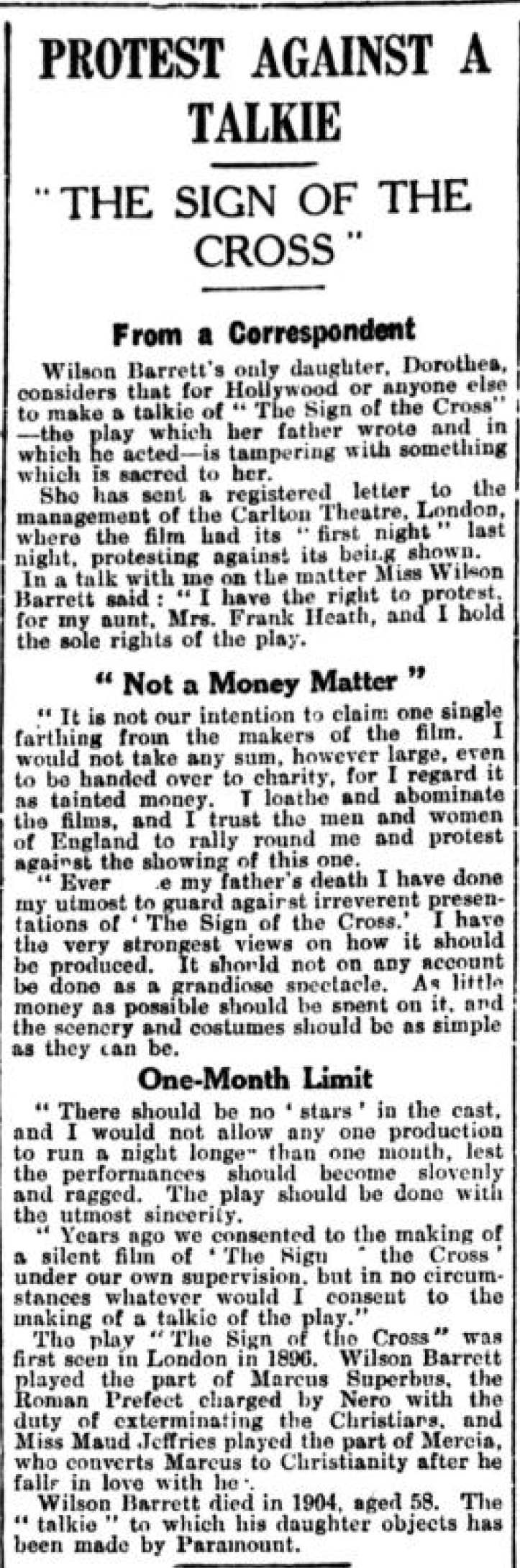
The Citizen, January 31, 1933.

As with many other pre-Code films that were reissued after the Motion Picture Production Code was strictly enforced in 1934, this film has a history of censorship. In the original version, Marcus Superbus is unsuccessful in his attempt to seduce Mercia, an innocent Christian girl. He then urges Ancaria to perform the erotic "Dance of the Naked Moon" that will "warm her into life". This "lesbian dance" was cut from the negative for a 1938 reissue, but was restored by MCA/Universal for its 1993 video release. Some gladiatorial combat footage was also cut for the 1938 reissue, as were arena sequences involving naked women being attacked by crocodiles and a gorilla. These were also restored in 1993.

DeMille himself supervised a new version for its 1944 rerelease. New footage with a World War II setting, featuring actor Stanley Ridges (who did not originally appear in the film) was added to make the film more topical. In the new prologue, a group of planes is seen flying over what was ancient Rome. The conversation of the soldiers in one of the planes leads directly into the film's original opening scene. The last few seconds of the edited version of the film showed the planes flying off into the distance, rather than simply fading out on the original closing scene.

For many years, this edit was the only one available. The version now shown on Turner Classic Movies has been restored to the original 125 minute length by the UCLA Film and Television Archive with the help of the DeMille estate and Universal Television, which now owns most pre-1950 Paramount sound features.

=== Catholic Legion of Decency ===
The reaction of the Catholic Church in the United States to the content in this film and in Ann Vickers helped lead to the 1934 formation of the Catholic Legion of Decency, an organization dedicated to identifying and combating objectionable content, from the point of view of the Church, in motion pictures.

== Legacy ==
In 1978, Claudette Colbert included The Sign of the Cross in the list "of her films she'd most like to own". The following year, she stated:

To us, a lot of his ideas were corny, but I don't think you can call him phony. He really believed in what he was doing. When we did the scene in The Sign of the Cross with the Christians being eaten by lions, he really suffered. Today, with everyone trying to be so sophisticated and tongue in cheek, something is taken away. DeMille's films were special: somehow when he put everything together, there was a special kind of glamour and sincerity. It's so different now.

Colbert bathing in the movie in milk gave rise to the famous modern myth of Cleopatra bathing in milk, through Colbert also being associated with her by portraying her in 1934.

== Home media ==
This film, along with Four Frightened People (1934), Cleopatra (1934), The Crusades (1935) and Union Pacific (1939), was released on DVD in 2006 by Universal Studios as part of The Cecil B. DeMille Collection. A new Blu-ray edition was released on August 25, 2020, by Kino Lorber.

== See also ==
- Nudity in film
- The Sign of the Cross (1914 silent film)
- The Sign of the Cross (play)

== Sources ==
Bibliography

- Barrett, Wilson The Sign of the Cross, J.B. Lippincott Company, (Philadelphia), 1896: Barrett's novelized version of his play.
- Birchard, Robert S. (2004). Cecil B. DeMille's Hollywood. University Press of Kentucky. ISBN 0-8131-2324-0.
- Black, Gregory D. (1996). Hollywood Censored: Morality Codes, Catholics, and the Movies. Cambridge University Press. ISBN 0-521-56592-8.
- DeMille, Cecil B. (1959). The Autobiography of Cecil B. DeMille. Prentice Hall. LCCN 59-15367.
- Quirk, Lawrence J. (1985). Claudette Colbert: An Illustrated Biography. New York: Crown Publishers. ISBN 0-517-55678-2.
- Vieira, Mark A. (1999). Sin in Soft Focus: Pre-Code Hollywood. New York: Harry N. Abrams, Inc. ISBN 0-8109-4475-8.

Online sources

- "The Sign of the Cross". Sex in the Cinema. The Kinsey Institute.
- Margarita Landazuri. "The Sign of the Cross". Turner Classic Movies. Turner Classic Movies.
- Cecilia de Mille Presley; Mark A. Vieira. "The Wickedest Movie in the World: How Cecil B. DeMille Made The Sign of the Cross". brightlightsfilm.com. Bright Lights Film Journal.
