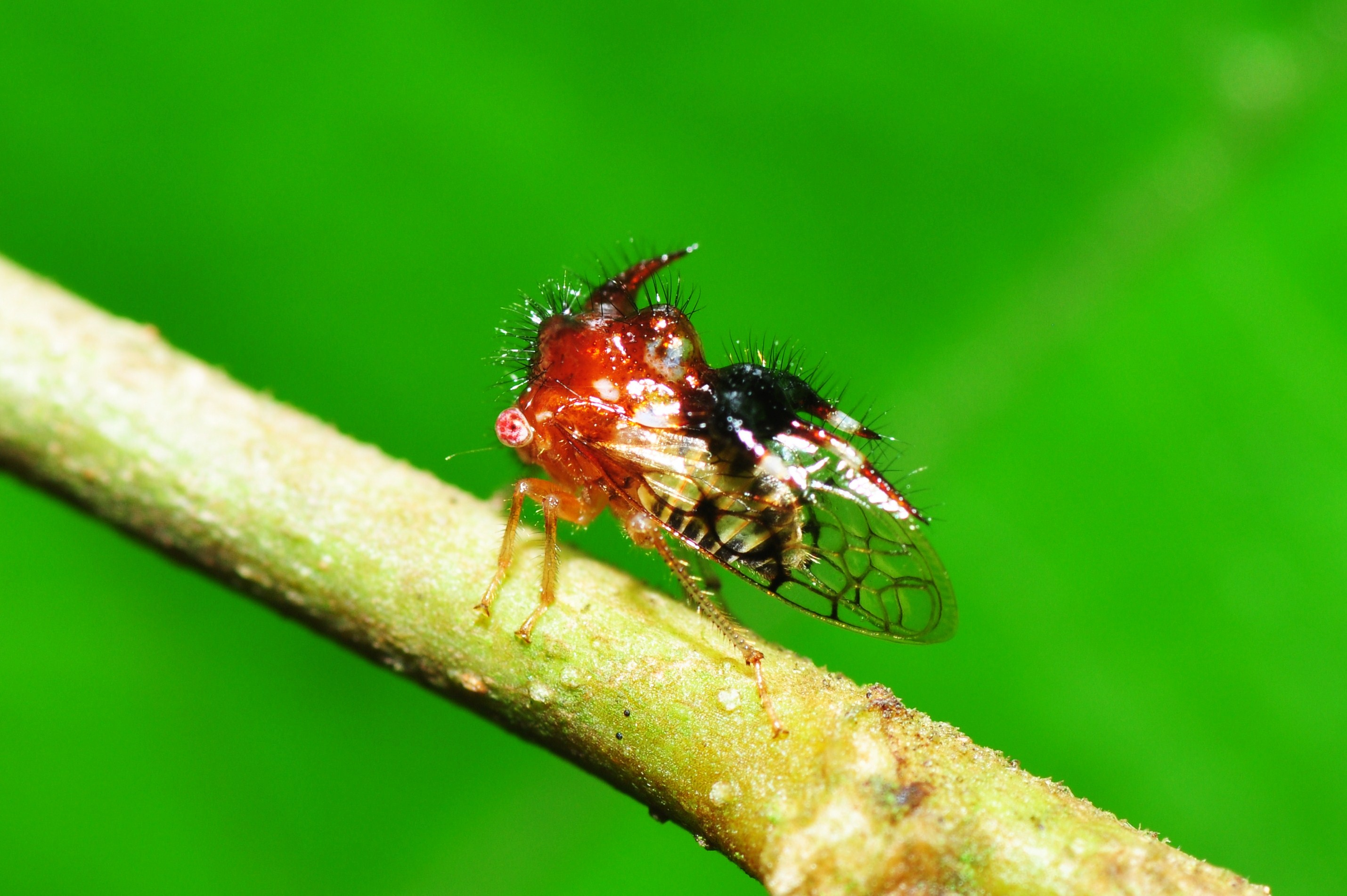

Scientific classification
- Kingdom: Animalia
- Phylum: Arthropoda
- Clade: Pancrustacea
- Class: Insecta
- Order: Hemiptera
- Suborder: Auchenorrhyncha
- Family: Membracidae
- Subfamily: Smiliinae
- Genus: Poppea; Stål, 1867

= Poppea =

Genus of bugs

Poppea is a genus of central and South American treehopper bugs in the subfamily Smiliinae and tribe Ceresini, erected by Carl Stål in 1867.
