= Mrs Dane's Defence =

Mrs Dane's Defence may refer to:

- Mrs Dane's Defence (play), a 1900 play by Henry Arthur Jones
  - Mrs. Dane's Defense (1918 film), an American drama silent film, based on the play
  - Mrs. Dane's Defense (1933 film), a British drama film, based on the play
