= Henry Kemble (actor, born 1848) =

British actor (1848–1907)

Kemble with Irene Vanbrugh in The Admirable Crichton, 1902

Henry Kemble (1 June 1848 – 17 November 1907) was a British actor. A member of the famed Kemble family, he was the grandson of Charles Kemble.

== Life ==
He was born in London, the son of Henry Kemble, a captain of the 37th Foot, and educated at Maze Hill School Greenwich, King's College School and King's College London.

In 1865 he took a post in the privy council office, but spent much of his time in amateur theatre, before making his professional début at the Theatre Royal, Dublin, on 7 October 1867. After a year or so as a junior member of the company there, he took old men and character parts in Edinburgh, Glasgow, Scarborough and Newcastle upon Tyne.

On 29 August 1874 he made his first appearance in London at Drury Lane as Tony Foster in Andrew Halliday's Amy Robsart and was the original Philip of France in the same author's Richard Coeur de Lion. He then took the part of Dr Caius in The Merry Wives of Windsor before joining John Hare's company at the Royal Court Theatre in 1875, where he played Dr Penguin in J. Palgrave Simpson's A Scrap of Paper. In September 1876 he appeared at the Prince of Wales Theatre as Crossby Beck in Bolton and Saville Rowe's Peril (an adaptation of Victorien Sardou's Nos intimes), followed by the parts of Sir Oliver Surface in The School for Scandal and Mr Trelawney Smith in an adaptation of Sardou's Duty by Albery.

On 31 January 1880 he appeared at the Haymarket Theatre as Mr Stout on the opening night of Bulwer-Lytton's Money. After two years alternating between the Haymarket and touring the provinces, first with Ellen Terry and then with Mrs Scott-Siddons, he reappeared in February 1882 at the Court Theatre as the Revd Mr Jones in Dion Boucicault's adaptation of My Little Girl and as Mr Justice Bunby in F. C. Burnand's farce The Manager. In 1885 he played his old part of Mr Snarl in Masks and Faces, by Charles Reade and Tom Taylor.

For the next fifteen years Kemble played lesser roles in the West End, including some Shakespeare at the Haymarket. In September 1891 he took the part of Polonius at the Theatre Royal, Manchester in Herbert Beerbohm Tree's first performance of Hamlet, later becoming a leading member of Tree's Crystal Palace company, joining Tree at Her Majesty's Theatre on 1 February 1902, to play the original Ctesippus in Stephen Phillips's Ulysses. His last stage appearance was in April 1907 as Archibald Coke in Henry Arthur Jones's The Liars at the Criterion Theatre.

He died, unmarried, in St Helier, Jersey. And is buried in St Saviour's graveyard Section 1 plot 20
