= Hoodman blind =

Hoodman blind is another name for the game blind man's buff.

It may also refer to:

- Hoodman Blind (1923), American silent film directed by John Ford
- Hoodman Blind (play) (1885), British melodrama by Wilson Barrett and Henry Arthur Jones
