= The Silver King (1919 film) =

1919 film by George Irving

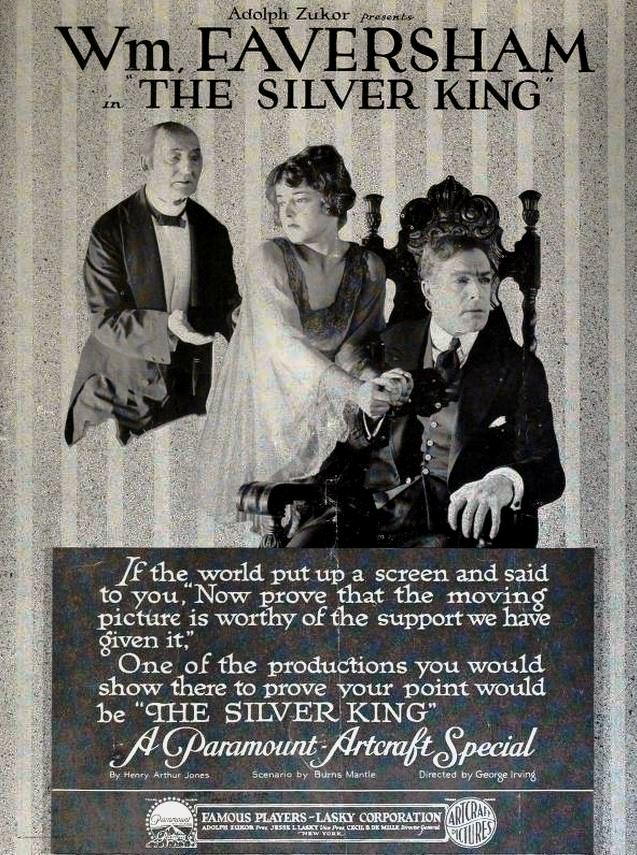
- Contemporary advertisement
- Directed by: George Irving
- Written by: Burns Mantle
- Based on: The Silver King by Henry Arthur Jones and Henry Herman
- Produced by: Adolph Zukor; Jesse Lasky
- Starring: William Faversham
- Cinematography: Al Liguori
- Distributed by: Famous Players–Lasky; Paramount / Artcraft
- Release date: January 12, 1919
- Running time: 5 reels
- Country: United States
- Language: Silent (English intertitles)

The Silver King is a lost 1919 American silent drama film directed by George Irving and starring stage star William Faversham. It is based on the play The Silver King by Henry Arthur Jones and Henry Herman.

== Cast ==
- William Faversham as Wilfred Denver
- Barbara Castleton as Nellie Denver
- Nadia Gray as Cissie Denver
- Lawrence Johnson as Neddie Denver
- John Sutherland as Jaikes
- Warburton Gamble as Herbertr Skinner
- Helen Meyers as Olive
- John Sunderland as Geoffrey Ware
- Daniel Pennell as Baxter
- Cecil Yapp as Henry Corkett
- William O'Day as Elijah Coombes
- Louis Hendricks as Cripps
- Robert Ayrton as Bilcher

== Production ==
The film was originally envisioned in 1914 with Guy Standing in the lead role of Wilfred Denver. This production was postponed indefinitely following the outbreak of World War I, which saw Standing accept a lieutenant's commission in the Royal Navy.
