= The Admirable Crichton =

Comic stage play (1902)

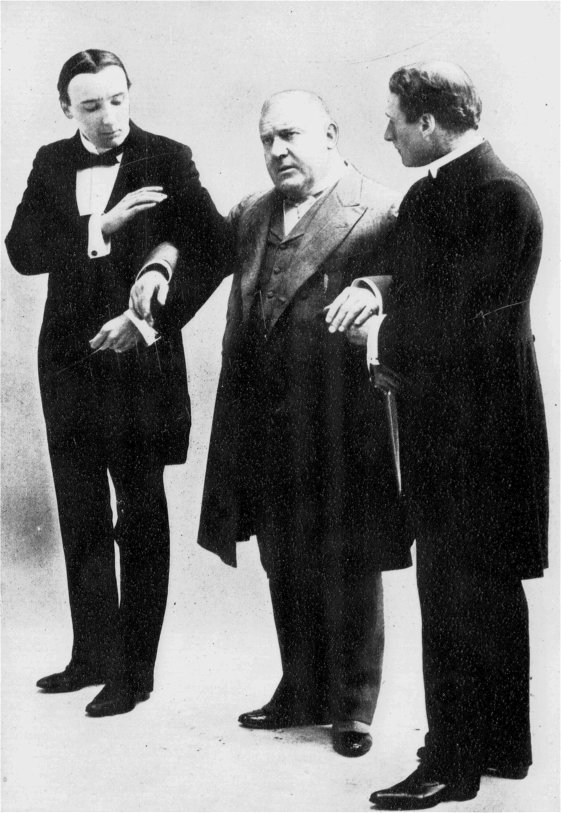
A scene from the 1902 production, including H. B. Irving as Crichton (left) and Henry Kemble, as the Earl of Loam (centre).

The Admirable Crichton is a comic stage play written in 1902 by J. M. Barrie and premiered in London in that year and in New York the next. It gently satirises English society by depicting the change in the balance of power between privileged aristocrats and a practical and resourceful butler when they are all shipwrecked on a desert island. The butler gradually becomes the benign ruler of the island and the aristocrats become his subjects until they are all rescued and conventional social relations are restored.

The three main roles are the butler – Crichton, Lady Mary Lasenby, and her father, the Earl of Loam. Actors starring as Crichton have included H. B. Irving, Walter Hampden, Kenneth More, Hugh Quarshie, Edward Fox and George Cole. Among those playing Lady Mary have been Irene Vanbrugh, Fay Bainter, Sally Ann Howes, Virginia McKenna, Prunella Scales and Niamh Cusack. Those playing Lord Loam have included Henry Kemble, Eric Lewis, Rex Harrison and Michael Denison.

== Background ==
By November 1902 J. M. Barrie was established as a West End playwright. His comedy Walker, London (1892) had run for 511 performances and The Little Minister (1897) for 320 performances. He had less outstanding, but still successful, runs with The Professor's Love Story (1894) and The Wedding Guest (1900). His Quality Street had a modest run on Broadway in 1901–02 and opened in London in September 1902, running for 459 performances.

Barrie took the title for his next play from an epithet applied by Sir Thomas Urquhart to James Crichton, a sixteenth-century Scottish traveller, polymath, and swordsman; Barrie's play features Bill Crichton, a butler whose resourcefulness rivals that of the historical Crichton. In a notebook entry for 1899 Barrie recorded two sources for the story: a remark made by Arthur Conan Doyle while he was staying with Barrie in Kirriemuir in 1893: "If a king and an able seaman were wrecked together on a desert island for the rest of their lives, the sailor would end as king and the monarch as his servant". The scene in the first act, in which Lord Loam and family entertain their servants, was based on a similar real-life occurrence in the household of Rosalind, Countess of Carlisle, an English aristocrat with radical views. Another possible influence is Ludwig Fulda's 1895 play Robinsons Eiland (1896), in which a shipwrecked grandee finds himself becoming subordinate to a resourceful and practical employee. That play was published in German in 1896, but never translated into English or produced in Britain.

== Premieres ==
The play was produced by Charles Frohman and directed by Dion Boucicault. It opened at the Duke of York's Theatre in London on 4 November 1902, running for 328 performances. The New York premiere followed in November 1903 at the Lyceum Theatre, where the production ran for 144 performances. Henry Kemble, Sybil Carlisle and Pattie Browne were in both the London and the New York opening casts.

On the island, 1902 production

Role	London, 1902	New York, 1903
Crichton	H. B. Irving	William Gillette
Earl of Loam	Henry Kemble	Henry Kemble
Lord Loam's daughters:
– Lady Mary Lasenby	Irene Vanbrugh (Note: Later in the run Sybil Carlisle and then Margaret Fraser)	Sybil Carlisle
– Lady Catherine Lasenby	Sybil Carlisle (Note: Later in the run Nellie Souray)	Marie Doro
– Lady Agatha Lasenby	Muriel Beaumont (Note: Later in the run Gertrude Henrique)	Rosalind Coghlan
Hon Ernest Woolley	Gerald du Maurier (Note: Later in the run Charles Troode)	Carter Pickford
Rev John Treherne	Clarence Blakiston	Harold Heaton
Naval Officer	J. C. Buckstone	H. A. Morey
Tompsett	Compton Coutts	Frederick Morris
Lord Brocklehurst	Carter Pickford	Soldene Powell
Dowager Countess of Brocklehurst	Fanny Coleman (Note: Later in the run M'Aimee Murray)	Kate Meek
Tweeny	Pattie Browne	Pattie Browne
Fisher	Margaret Fraser (Note: Later in the run Gertrude Henriques)	Sybil Campbell

== Synopsis ==
Mary (left), Agatha (centre) and Catherine in the 1902 production.

=== Act One ===
The first act is set in Loam Hall, the country house of the Earl of Loam, a British peer. Crichton is his butler. Loam believes the class divisions in British society are artificial and undesirable. He promotes his views during monthly tea parties, where servants mingle with his aristocratic guests, to the embarrassment of all. Crichton particularly disapproves, considering the class system to be "the natural outcome of a civilised society".

=== Act Two ===
Loam, his family and friends, and Crichton are shipwrecked on a deserted tropical island. The resourceful Crichton is the only one of the party with any practical knowledge, and he gradually assumes, initially with reluctance, the position of leader. This role begins to take on sinister tones when he starts training Ernest, one of the young aristocrats with them, to break a liking for laboured epigrams by putting his head in a bucket of water whenever he makes one. Crichton's social betters at first resist his growing influence and go their separate ways, but in a pivotal scene they return, showing their acquiescence by accepting the food Crichton alone has been able to find and cook.

=== Act Three ===
Irving and Vanbrugh, 1902

In the third act the action has advanced two years. Crichton has civilised the island with farming and house building and now, called "the Guv", is waited on with the trappings and privileges of power, just as his master had been in Britain. Lady Mary, Loam's eldest daughter, falls in love with Crichton, forgetting her engagement to Lord Brocklehurst at home. Also in love with Crichton is Tweeny, Lord Loam's between maid. Just as Lady Mary and Crichton are about to be married by a clergyman who was shipwrecked with them, the sound of a ship's gun is heard. After a moment's temptation not to reveal their whereabouts, Crichton makes the conventionally decent choice and launches a signal. As the rescuers greet the castaways, he resumes his status as butler.

=== Act Four ===
Subtitled "The Other Island", the final act is set back at Loam Hall, where the status quo ante has returned uneasily. The Lasenbys and their friends are embarrassed by Crichton's presence, since Ernest has published a false account of events on the island, presenting himself and Lord Loam in key roles. The dowager Lady Brocklehurst, Lord Brocklehurst's mother, quizzes the family and servants about events on the island, suspecting that Lady Mary might have been unfaithful to Brocklehurst. The household evades these questions, except for a final one when Lady Mary reacts with shock – "Oh no, impossible …" – to the suggestion that Crichton might become butler at her married household. To protect her, Crichton explains the impossibility is due to his leaving domestic service, and the play ends with his and Lady Mary's regretful final parting. In the original version of the play Crichton says that he is going to marry Tweeny and run a public house in the Harrow Road.

== Reception ==
The play was praised by reviewers on both sides of the Atlantic. The Daily Telegraph said, "Mr Barrie's new play is pure phantasy from beginning to end. Bright, eccentric, paradoxical … ingenious and clever". The Times called the play "as delightful a piece as the English stage has produced in our generation – always fresh and exhilarating". The New York Tribune described the play as "a clean, wholesome and sparkling entertainment, exciting thoughtful laughter and refreshing the spectators with a sense of the originality of the design and the delicacy and whimsical character of the treatment".

== Analysis ==
The play deals with serious class issues that were controversial at the time. After the first performance the actor-manager Sir Squire Bancroft commented to A. E. W. Mason, "It deals, my dear Mason, with the juxtaposition of the drawing-room and the servants' hall – always to me a very painful subject". The literary scholar Michael Patterson writes:

It is a tradition of world drama at least as old as Plautus that servants are often more resourceful and inventive than their masters. This tradition is playfully exploited by Barrie … while touching on serious issues of class. Significantly, Lord Loam's minimal gesture towards democracy is limited to one hour a month. Only when the family are uprooted from their social context by being stranded in the middle of the ocean can those of merit prove their superiority over those privileged by the accident of birth. Since the family, and especially the charming Lady Mary, remain reasonably likeable, Barrie's attitude was hardly revolutionary, but it was certainly subversive.

Barrie had considered a more controversial resolution – particularly an upbeat ending with Crichton and Lady Mary continuing their relationship – but decided "the stalls wouldn't stand it".

Barrie's biographer H. M. Geduld has written that for some of his characters Barrie used real-life models, basing Crichton on himself, Tweeny on his mother, Lady Mary on his wife and Lord Loam on his father. Geduld comments that although Barrie succeeded with spoken comedy and drama, he "was not the potential heir to the mantle of W. S. Gilbert" as a comic opera librettist. Nevertheless, for Geduld Barrie's one, failed, attempt to write a libretto (Jane Annie for Richard D'Oyly Carte) paid dividends for his spoken plays: The Admirable Crichton "has more than a hint of the comic-opera libretto. There is a Gilbertian touch to the characterization, and much of the dialogue has the flavor of incipient recitative".

== Revivals ==
Miriam Clements and Lyn Harding in the first revival, 1908

The play was first revived in 1908 at the Duke of York's, with Lyn Harding as Crichton, Miriam Clements as Lady Mary and Eric Lewis as Lord Loam. Also in the cast were du Maurier reprising his Ernest, Donald Calthrop as the naval officer and Hilda Trevelyan as Tweeny. In a 1920 revival at the Royalty Theatre Dennis Eadie played Crichton, with Julia James as Lady Mary, Alfred Bishop as Lord Loam and Lady Tree as Lady Brocklehurst.

George C. Tyler revived the play at the New Amsterdam Theatre in New York in 1931 starring Walter Hampden as Crichton, Fay Bainter as Lady Mary and Herbert Druce as Lord Loam. A 1943 production at His Majesty's in London featured Barry K Barnes, Diana Churchill and James Harcourt.

A 1977 revival at the Greenwich Theatre featured Frank Barrie in the title role, with Gayle Hunnicutt as Lady Mary and Trevor Baxter as Lord Loam. In 1985 the play was staged at the Royal Exchange, Manchester with Hugh Quarshie as Crichton, Janet McTeer as Lady Mary and Michael Craig as Lord Loam, with Amanda Donohoe as Lady Catherine and Avril Elgar as Lady Brocklehurst. The play was revived in London in 1988 with Edward Fox as Crichton, Niamh Cusack as Lady Mary and Rex Harrison as Lord Loam. At the Chichester Festival in 1997 Ian McShane played Crichton, with Victoria Scarborough as Lady Mary and Michael Denison as Lord Loam.

== Adaptations ==
A 1941 BBC Radio adaptation starred Cecil Trouncer as Crichton and Mary Hinton as Lady Mary. A second BBC radio version, broadcast in 1949 featured Howard Marion-Crawford, Pamela May and Austin Trevor. For a 1966 version, George Cole played Crichton, with Joanna Dunham as Mary and Norman Shelley as Loam. In 1973 a fourth BBC radio adaptation featured Denholm Elliott as Crichton, with Prunella Scales as Mary and Ralph Truman as Loam. A 1986 version featured Kenneth Cranham in the title role, with Sylvestra Le Touzel as Mary and Richard Pearson as Loam. In 2009 another BBC radio adaptation featured Russell Tovey as Crichton, with Beth Chambers as Mary and David Timson as Loam.

In a BBC Television version in 1950, Raymond Huntley played Crichton, with Joan Hopkins as Lady Mary and Harcourt Williams as Lord Loam. A second television version was made by NBC in 1968, starring Bill Travers as Crichton, with Virginia McKenna as Mary and Laurence Naismith as Loam.

The play has twice been adapted for the cinema. A 1918 film was directed by G. B. Samuelson with Basil Gill in the title role and Mary Dibley as Mary. A 1957 film starred Kenneth More, Sally Ann Howes and Cecil Parker. It was released in the United States as "Paradise Lagoon".

=== Derivative works ===
Several films have drawn on Barrie's original. Male and Female, a 1919 Cecil B. De Mille silent film, starred Thomas Meighan and Gloria Swanson. De Mille later said, "We had to change the title ... because I was certain that the public would believe The Admirable Crichton was a naval picture". Also drawing on the play were We're Not Dressing, a 1934 Bing Crosby and Carole Lombard film; a 1936 Chinese film, Back to Nature, written and directed by Sun Yu; and a 2022 film, Triangle of Sadness.

== Notes, references and sources ==
=== Sources ===
- Baer, D. Richard (1972). The Film Buff's Bible. Los Angeles: Hollywood Film Archive. ISBN 091361601X.
- Balsari-Shah, Shefali (1989). "Introduction". The Admirable Crichton. London: Sangam. ISBN 0861317947.
- Gaye, Freda, ed. (1967). Who's Who in the Theatre (fourteenth ed.). London: Sir Isaac Pitman and Sons. OCLC 5997224.
- Geduld, Harry M. (1971). Sir James Barrie. New York: Twayne. OCLC 138650.
- Leyda, Jay (1972). Dianying: An Account of Films and the Film Audience in China. Cambridge, MA: MIT Press. ISBN 0-262-12046-1.
- Lyttelton, George; Hart-Davis, Rupert (1979). Lyttelton–Hart-Davis Letters. Vol. 2. London: John Murray. ISBN 978-0-7195-3673-1.
- Wearing, J. P. (1981). The London Stage, 1900–1919: A Calendar of Plays and Players. Metuchen: Scarecrow Press. ISBN 081081403X.
