= Kom K and Kom W =

Neolithic archaeological sites in Egypt

- Kom K and Kom W Kom K and Kom W archaeological sites in Egypt

History
- Built: ~4650 – 4350 BCE (occupation), with scattered evidence into the 6th millennium BCE

Kom K and Kom W are Neolithic archaeological sites in the northern Fayum region of Egypt dating to the mid-5th millennium BCE with evidence of human occupation for approximately three centuries (4650-4350 BCE) from the stratified hearth mounds. Radiocarbon dates from charcoal and botanicals found beyond the mounds yield older yet scattered dates well into the 6th millennium BCE. Both sites are situated near the shores of Lake Qarun, which was extensively researched for its water level fluctuation, due to shifts in the Nile floods and its effect on human occupation periods. Kom K and Kom W were both situated within 1 km of the lake during most of its human occupation periods when lake levels were much higher. The first academic fieldwork was carried out by archaeologist Gertrude Caton-Thompson and geologist Elinor Wight Gardner in the three seasons of 1924–5, 1925–6, and 1927–8. Kom K and Kom W yielded archaeological findings that differ from the culture units within the Egyptian Neolithic known at the time leading Caton-Thompson and Gardner to claim the sites as part of Fayum A and B cultures (also called the Faiyumian or Fayum Neolithic). The area has been re-investigated by the URU Fayum Project since 2004 where it has since been threatened by agriculture and development.

== Kom K ==
Discovered by Elinor Wight Gardner while she was mapping the area in the preliminary seasons, the Kom K mound measures 6568 m^{2} and is known for its early storage centers of grain. Radiocarbon dating of charcoal from the stratified Kom K mound places human occupation during the mid-5th millennium BCE, but samples from the hearths and pits near the mound show older dates from the mid-6th millennium BCE. 16 newly discovered hearths were found at the mound during a survey in 2006. Although cited as a village in older literature, recent studies show Kom K lacking in evidence of definite settlement structures that would convey permanent and continuous settlement. Rather, Kom K likely had intermittent occupation settlements and strong associations as a storage center, yet a village is not necessarily ruled out.

=== Granaries ===
Kom K is distinguished by its two granary groups, the Upper and Lower K Pitts, the first is located about a half mile northeast of Kom K and the second is located a half mile north of Kom K and west of the first granary. Wheat and barley samples were taken from the Upper K Pits and were dated by radiocarbon to 4450 BCE. There were 183 pits identified by Caton-Thompson during her 3 field seasons of the mid-1920s. In the Upper K region, 67 pits were identified, 56 were silos, and the rest accounted for holes with pots, wooden artifacts and/or basketry inside. 42 of the silos were lined with coiled straw and 4 of them had a significant amount of cereal samples which were identified as a barley-wheat mixture. 13 additional pits were discovered by the URU Fayum Project in 2004, bringing the total number of pits in the Upper K region to 196. 7 of the newly discovered pits were identified as production areas for the desert clay, sand, crushed shell, and water mortar used to construct lids for the storage pits. In the second group 116 pits were identified, 109 of which were silos and the remaining 7 were large pot emplacements. Of the 109 silos, 38 were lined with either straw or reed (reed was not found in the Upper K Pits). These Lower K Pits were less preserved than the Upper K Pits.

=== Basketry ===
In total, 80 of the pits at both the Upper and Lower K regions contained some sort of wheat straw and grass basketry lining. These basket linings would be important for protecting the grain from moisture and to keep it clean. Both Upper and Lower K Pits used a wheat straw and grass mix for the bundle, but preference of palm leaf or cyperaceae culm winders are seen in the Lower K Pits basketry, as opposed to using the wheat straw and grasses for winders.

== Kom W ==
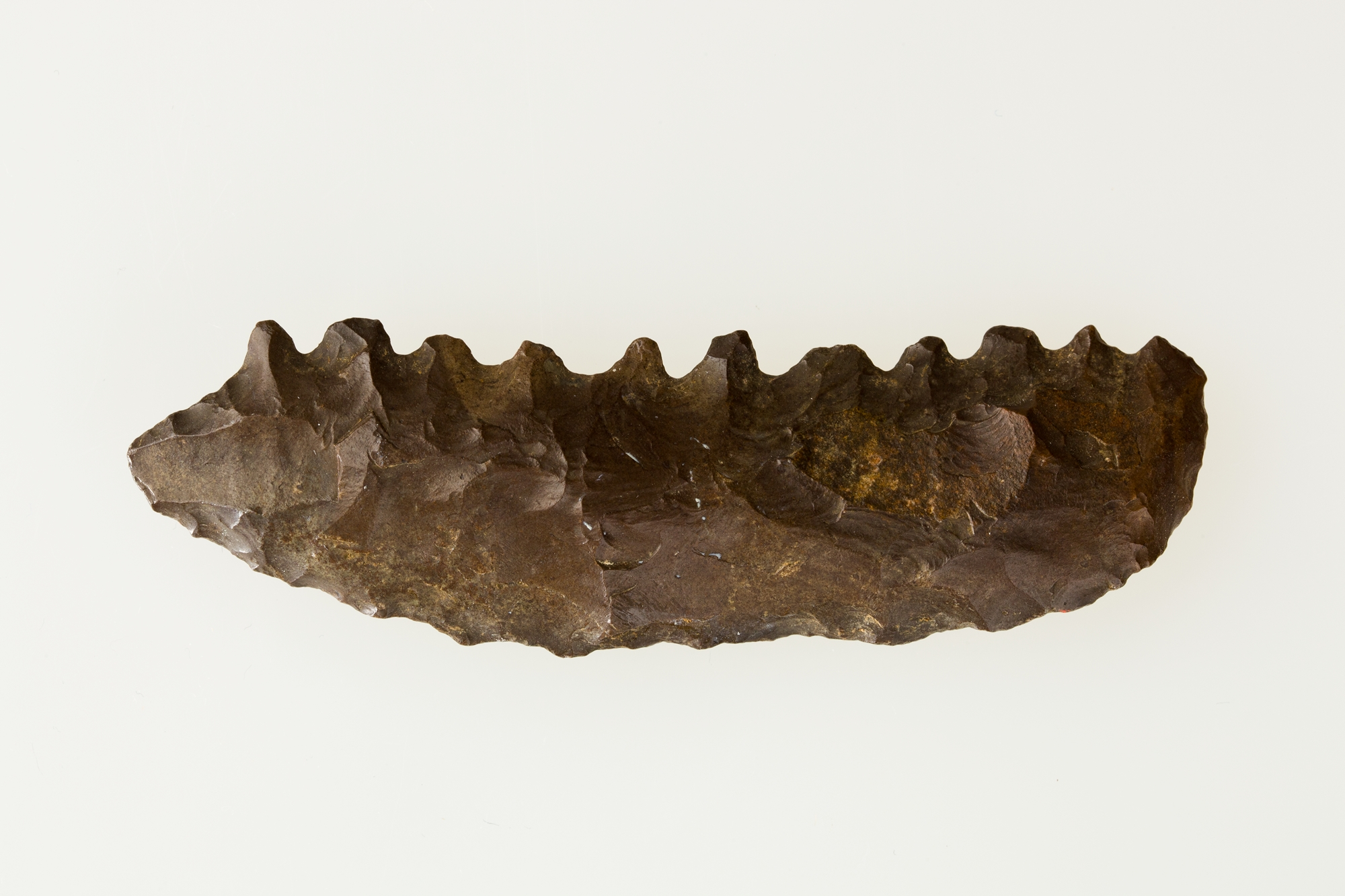
Egyptian neolithic serrated flint tool

The Kom W mound covers an area of approximately 7196 m^{2} and was situated by an inlet of Lake Qarun whose clays and sands made the land arable. Surrounding the mound, lay a flat ground of lacustrine sandrock and a wind-blown sand layer that forms small dunes. These shifting dunes often reveal flint artifacts and pottery sherds. It was thought that Caton-Thompson excavated the entire mound, but 2-foot wide baulks between her original trenches were discovered in 2006. This allowed the use of contemporary technological analyses on the undisturbed stratified material, especially the use of dating techniques that were not possible in the 1920s. Radiocarbon dates place both Kom K and Kom W mound's occupation period at 4650-4350 BCE. 248 pits cut into the lacustrine deposits were discovered at the site with charcoal and botanics being recovered from some. Kom W is referred to be the origin of the "Fayum industry" by Caton-Thompson and Gardner. Like Kom K, Kom W was also cited as a village by Caton-Thompson, yet further archaeological research has not found any evidence of permanent structures.

=== Pottery ===
The pottery found within the vicinity of Kom W was categorized into five different forms by Caton-Thompson: small bowls and cups, cooking bowls and pots, pedestalled cups, cups with knobbed feet, and rectangular dishes with peaked rims. Caton-Thompson interpreted 248 feature pits as hearths. The hearths of both Kom K and Kom W are slightly older than the mounds, dating from 5680 BCE. Among the identified feature pits of Kom W, 161 were empty, 55 contained some fragment or sherd of pottery, and 12 held complete ceramic vessels. Some of these vessels contained faunal bones of mostly fish and some small mammals.

== Artifacts ==
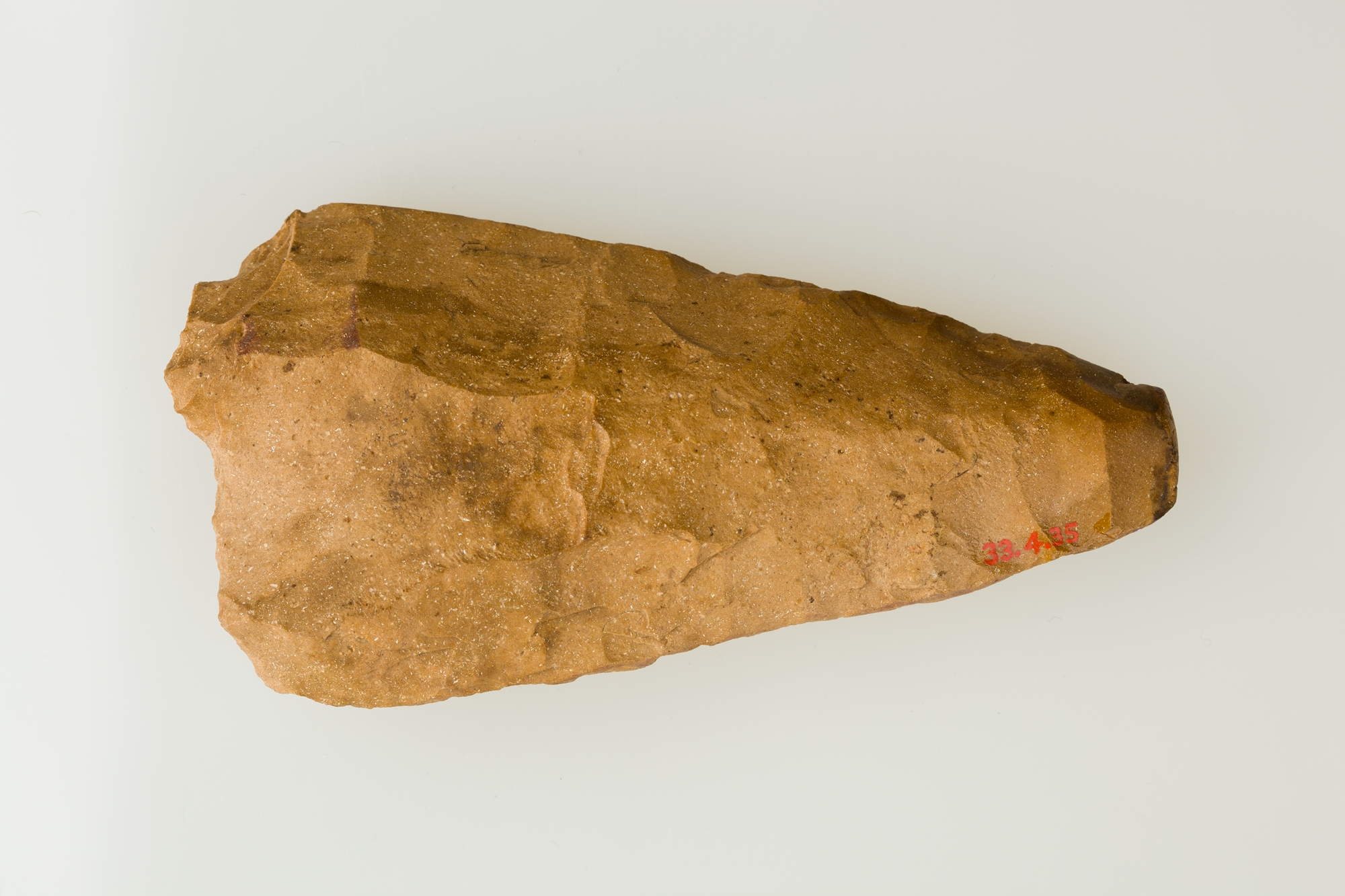
Egyptian neolithic hand axe

Excavations at Kom K and W yielded a plethora of flint artifacts including axes, adzes, projectile points, concave base points, sickle blades, scrapers, tabular knives, gouges, microliths, and pebble-butted and pebble-backed tools. Excavations at Kom W also revealed a concentration of quern-stones around the area, which was not found at Kom K. Personal ornaments such as ostrich eggshell beads, bone rings, stone beads, and a fragment of a marine shell bracelet or large ring have been excavated at the sites.

== Animals ==
Archaeological evidence of domesticated pigs, goats, bovines, and sheep were excavated and puts domestication of the broader Fayum at 5200 BCE to 4200 BCE. Charred goat pellets were found inside several hearths at both Kom K and W and are interpreted as being used as a fuel for fires. Although there is plenty evidence of domesticates and stock animals, fish remains heavily dominate the record. The reliance on Lake Quran has proven to be an important relationship for the people living at and passing by the Kom sites.

== Mobility ==
Archaeological evidence of pottery, agriculture, storage pits, and the presence of domesticated pigs may point to a sedentary lifestyle, but other factors that support a mobile lifestyle cannot be ignored. Lake Quran could have sustained year-round habitation at the Kom sites, but there is a lack of any permanent structure evidence and burials. Analysis on the basketry and linings found at the granaries and other pits show repeated sealing of the lids which could be interpreted as long-term storage and food security for people when they travel back to the area. Lithic analysis also shows favor to a somewhat mobile people.

== Recent research ==
The Desert Fayum was produced by Caton-Thompson and Gardner detailing their work done at the Fayum. Early in her archaeological career, Mary Leakey was commissioned to illustrate some of the lithics. Although Caton-Thompson's monograph is still a relevant reference and great example of archaeological methods for its time, there is new research being conducted in the Fayum at Kom K and Kom W by a team of researchers from the University of California, Los Angeles, the University of Groningen and the University of Auckland. These universities have initiated the URU Fayum Project which covers archaeological research and cultural heritage management concentrating on the Neolithic and Greco-Roman periods of the Fayum. The project investigates land and water use during the development of agriculture and its relationships to human interaction. The broader Fayum region has been studied by the project since 2002, the Kom K granaries have been surveyed and excavated since 2004, and Kom K and Kom W have been revisited since 2006. Very little fieldwork has been conducted at the sites since Caton-Thompson because it was thought to be completely excavated, but also thought to be largely destroyed due to agricultural practices since the 1960s. The URU archaeological team unexpectedly found a series of canals approved by the Egyptian Public Company for Land Reclamation cutting through the Upper K Pits which destroyed 15 pits and left the rest of the area relatively undisturbed. With further survey of the damaged Upper K Pits region, 13 new pits were found, unfortunately in the subsequent season the new pits were destroyed by heavy mechanical equipment, Kom W has also been damaged with bulldozing and mine drilling equipment. The URU Fayum Project and Egypt's Supreme Council of Antiquities succeeded in building a fence around the Upper K Pitts to protect from development and looting. The north of Lake Quran has been threatened with urban development projects since the late 1990s. In 2014, a major freeway was constructed which curves south of Kom W and north of the Upper K Pits, threatening the vulnerable archaeological record.
