= Gertrude Caton Thompson =

British archaeologist (1888–1985)

Gertrude Caton-Thompson FBA
- Caton-Thompson in 1938
- Born: Gertrude Page Caton Thompson; 1 February 1888; London, England
- Died: 18 April 1985 (aged 97); Broadway, Worcestershire, England
- Education: British School of Archaeology in Egypt; University College London; University of Cambridge
- Occupation: archaeologist
- Known for: Abydos, Egypt; Oxyrhynchus; Faiyum

Gertrude Page Caton-Thompson FBA (née Caton Thompson; 1 February 1888 – 18 April 1985) was an English archaeologist at a time when participation by women in the discipline was uncommon. Much of her archaeological work was conducted in Egypt. However, she also worked on expeditions in Zimbabwe, Malta, and South Arabia.

Her notable contributions to the field of archaeology include creating a technique for excavating archaeological sites and information on Paleolithic to Predynastic civilizations in Zimbabwe and Egypt. Caton-Thompson held many official positions in organizations such as the Prehistoric Society and the Royal Anthropological Institute.

== Early life ==
Caton-Thompson was born Gertrude Page Caton Thompson on 1 February 1888 in London to William Caton Thompson, a barrister and head of the legal branch of London and North Western Railway, and Ethel Gertrude Thompson (née Page; later Moore). On 15 April 1888, Caton-Thompson was baptised at St Edmund, King and Martyr. The youngest of two siblings, the family later moved to Bassett, Hampshire (present-day Southampton).

Caton-Thompson's father died when she was 5 years old, and her mother remarried George Moore, a physician and widower with 5 children, in 1900. Educated by a governess until the age of 12, Caton-Thompson studied at The Links boarding school in Eastbourne. The Links, made up of around 25 female students, would travel and stay for several months in a European city and Caton-Thompson stayed during her studies in Dresden and Florence. In 1905, Caton-Thompson traveled to Paris in order to complete her education.

Her interest in archaeology began on a trip to Egypt with her mother in 1911, followed by a series of lectures on Ancient Greece given by Sarah Paterson at the British Museum. An inheritance received in 1912 helped ensure her financial independence and support her later excavations.

Caton-Thompson's first experience in the field came in 1915 working as a bottle washer in an excavation in France. During World War I, she worked for the British Ministry of Shipping as part of which she attended the Paris Peace Conference in 1919.

In 1921, Caton-Thompson embarked on studies at University College London where she was taught by Margaret Murray, Flinders Petrie and Dorothea Bate and worked at Petrie’s excavations in Upper Egypt at Abydos and Oxyrhynchus during the winter of 1921-1922. The following year she began attending courses at the University of Cambridge, before joining further excavations at Qau in Egypt with Petrie and Guy Brunton in 1924.

== Work in Malta ==
In 1921, Margaret Murray was invited to excavate at Borg en Nadur, a megalithic temple near St George's Bay in Malta, by Themistocles Zammit. This work formed part of her wider research in southern Malta, and Gertrude Caton-Thompson was part of the all-female team that accompanied her.

Gertrude's responsibilities included investigating a prehistoric cave near the temple at Għar Dalam, searching for neanderthal skulls as evidence for a land bridge between Malta and the continent of Africa. Though she did not find evidence to support this theory, the excavation yielded other notable artifacts, such as Bronze Age pottery that closely paralleled Sicilian styles of the same period.

== Work in Egypt ==
During the 1920s she worked as an archaeologist, primarily in Egypt for the British School of Archaeology Egypt, although she also conducted fieldwork in Malta. In Egypt she participated in excavations at a number of sites including Abydos, El-Badari, and Qau el Kebir. Caton-Thompson took a special interest in all aspects of Prehistoric Egypt and was one of the first archaeologists to look at the full-time spectrum from the Palaeolithic through to Predynastic Egypt. Caton-Thompson not only found a number of archaeological artifacts from Egypt, she also organized their display at the Egyptian Exhibition in England. Many of these finds are now in the British Museum's permanent collection, with smaller collections in the Ashmolean Museum in Oxford and the Birmingham Museum and Art Gallery.

While working in the Badari region during 1923 to 1924, she explored prehistoric settlement remains at Hemamieh. Caton-Thompson's work at the site was distinguished by its meticulousness. Caton-Thompson began her work by organizing the site into ten by thirty foot intervals. She carefully excavated in arbitrary six-inch levels, and recorded the exact position of each artifact. Along with her excavation techniques, Caton-Thompson was also the first to use air surveys to locate archaeological sites. Such approaches to excavation were in many respects a generation ahead of her time and "sets her apart from her contemporaries and the majority of her successors".

In 1925, Caton-Thompson and the geologist Elinor Wight Gardner began the first archaeological and geological survey of the northern Faiyum, where they sought to correlate ancient lake levels with archaeological stratification. Caton-Thompson found the earliest farming civilization to date in the Fayum region of Egypt, estimated to about 4000 B.C. They continued working in the Faiyum over the next two years for the Royal Anthropological Institute where they discovered two previously unknown Neolithic cultures, mainly based on evidence from their Kom K and Kom W excavations.

Caton-Thompson and Wight Gardner also worked on prehistoric sites at Kharga Oasis during three expeditions from 1930 to 1933. Caton-Thompson had made her first visit there in 1928 during her expedition to the Zimbabwe excavations. Since the Kharga Scarp contained many Paleolithic sites, Caton-Thompson was able to excavate many implements used by those civilizations using meticulous soil scrutiny and how she noted where objects were positioned in relation to each other. This approach revolutionised how archaeological sites were surveyed and studied. The flints she bought back to London are permanently housed in the Institute of Archaeology in London.

Her publication of "Kharga Oasis in Prehistory" was the first publication of the new Athlone Press of the University of London. She determined that the Kharga Scarp contained water without rainfall, which helped to supply water to a Neolithic civilization. This led to research more broadly on the palaeolithic civilizations of North Africa, which Caton-Thompson published in 1952.

== Great Zimbabwe ==
In 1928, the British Academy invited Caton-Thompson to investigate the origins of ruins in south-eastern Zimbabwe, near Lake Mutirikwe. The site contained multiple buildings within three sets of structures. Caton-Thompson assembled an all female expedition for the Zimbabwe excavations, which was the first of its kind.

Known since the 16th century, Great Zimbabwe had been previously excavated by James Theodore Bent and David Randall-MacIver and there was debate as to whether the site was the work of Africans (MacIver's view) or of some other civilisation. Caton-Thompson used ceramics, which were similar to what modern villagers were using, and structures such as terrace walls to determine who built the structures from the site. Working with Kathleen Kenyon, Caton-Thompson's excavations led her to the view that Zimbabwe was the product of a "native civilisation", publishing her results in a book called "The Zimbabwe Culture" in 1931. The assertion attracted considerable press attention and was received negatively by many within the archaeological community. She received hate mail from Victor Loret and Alfred Charles Auguste Foucher, whose views on the Great Zimbabwe she challenged. Caton-Thompson claimed to keep hostile letters from local experts in a file marked "insane". Modern archaeologists now agree that the city was the product of a Shona-speaking African civilisation.

== Later life ==
In 1932, she employed Mary Leakey to illustrate her book The Desert Fayum, greatly influencing her later career in palaeoanthropology. Towards the end of 1937 Caton-Thompson and Elinor Gardner, accompanied by Freya Stark, initiated the first systematic excavation in the Yemen at Hadhramaut (coincidentally, also a region explored by Theodore Bent). However, relations between Caton-Thompson and Stark were notoriously strained, with Stark deriding an anonymous but identifiable female archaeologist in her book A Winter in Arabia in 1940.

Caton-Thompson retired from fieldwork after the Second World War. A long time friend of Dorothy Hoare, a colleague from Cambridge, Caton-Thompson bought and shared a house with Hoare. After Hoare married José Maria de Navarro, son of the American actress Mary Anderson, and himself another Cambridge lecturer in archaeology, the Navarros continued to share the house with Caton-Thompson. When she and the Navarros retired from academic life in 1956, Caton-Thompson moved with them to their home in Broadway, Worcestershire - Court Farm. Nonetheless, she continued to engage with her interest in African history, playing an active role in the Third Pan-African Congress on Prehistory, held in Livingstone in 1955. She also went on to write the new introduction for the American edition of the book "The Zimbabwe Culture", published in 1971. Caton-Thompson went on to have her memoirs released as an autobiography entitled "Mixed Memoirs" in 1983. She would reside with them and their son, Michael for the rest of her life. She died in 1985, in her 97th year at Broadway, Worcestershire.

== Awards and honours ==
Caton-Thompson was awarded the Cuthbert Peek award of the Royal Geographical Society in 1932. She was also the first woman to receive the Rivers and Huxley Medals from the Royal Anthropological Institute in 1934 and 1946.

In 1938 she was offered the post of Disney Professor of Archaeology at Cambridge but rejected the role which was subsequently accepted by Dorothy Garrod. However, she was a research fellow at Newnham College, Cambridge in 1923 and declared an honorary fellow from 1934 to 1945, receiving an honorary Litt. D. in 1954.

She was the first female President of the Prehistoric Society from 1940 to 1946. In 1944, she was elected both as a fellow of the British Academy, to which she gifted 20,000 guineas in 1968, and as the vice president of the Royal Anthropological Institute. She received the Huxley Medal from the Royal Anthropological Institute in 1946 and the Burton Medal of the Royal Asiatic Society in 1954.

In 1961 she was a founding member of the British School of History and Archaeology in East Africa and was made an honorary fellow after serving on the council for 10 years. She also served as Governor of Bedford College for Women and the School of Oriental and African Studies.

=== Publications ===
- Guy Brunton, Gertrude Caton Thompson, The Badarian civilisation and predynastic remains near Badari, British School of Archaeology in Egypt, London 1928.
- The Zimbabwe Culture, 1931; F. Cass, 1970
- Gertrude Caton Thompson, Elinor Wight Gardner The Desert Fayum, Royal Anthropological Institute of Great Britain and Ireland, 1934.
- The Tombs and Moon Temple of Hureidha (Hadhramaut), Oxford for the Society of Antiquaries, 1944
- Kharga Oasis in Prehistory, University of London, 1952
- Mixed memoirs, Paradigm Press, 1983
