= Mary Anderson (actress, born 1859) =

American actress (1859–1940)

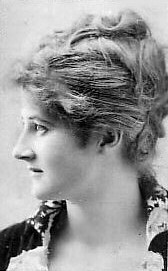
- Anderson in 1883
- Born: July 28, 1859; Sacramento, California, US
- Died: May 29, 1940 (aged 80); Broadway, Worcestershire, UK
- Occupation: Actress
- Spouse: Antonio Fernando de Navarro (m. 1880; died 1932)
- Children: 3, including José Maria de Navarro
- Relatives: Dorothy de Navarro (daughter-in-law)

Mary Antoinette Anderson (July 28, 1859 – May 29, 1940) was an American actress performing in theater her early years and silent films in later life.

== Early life ==
Anderson was born Mary Antoinette Anderson on July 28, 1859, in Sacramento, California, to Charles Henry Anderson (died 1863) and Antonia Anderson (née Leugers, later Griffin). Her father was born in England, and her mother was of German descent. In 1860, the family moved to Louisville, Kentucky, where Anderson's father later enlisted in the Confederate States Army during the American Civil War. He was killed in action at Mobile, Alabama, when Mary was three years old. Anderson's mother later remarried Hamilton Griffin, a physician and former Army surgeon for the Confederacy, in 1867.

Educated in Louisville at the Ursuline convent, Anderson later attended the Presentation Academy. She was an unenthusiastic pupil but showed early interest in reading and acting Shakespeare; she also took private lessons in music, dancing and literature. Encouraged by her stepfather, at 14 she was sent to New York for ten lessons with the actor George Vandenhoff, her only professional training. On December 12, 1875, Anderson was formally adopted by Griffin.

== Stage career ==
In 1875, she made her first stage appearance at a benefit performance at Macauley's Theatre, Louisville, in the role of Juliet The manager, Barney Macauley, extended her booking to a week as Juliet and further roles including Julia in Sheridan Knowles' The Hunchback, Bianca in Henry Hart Milman's Fazio, and R. L. Sheil's Evadne.

Further engagements at St. Louis, Missouri, New Orleans, Louisiana and John McCullough's theatre in San Francisco led to a contract with John T. Ford. Starting as Lady Macbeth in his Washington theatre in 1877, she began an extensive US tour, culminating with a six-week engagement in Edward Bulwer Lytton's The Lady of Lyons at the 5th Avenue Theatre in New York City. In 1883, after starring in an American production of W. S. Gilbert's Pygmalion and Galatea, she appeared in London at the Lyceum Theatre, remaining in England for six years gaining wide notice, including at the Shakespeare Memorial Theatre in Stratford-on-Avon. Her first season there, she starred in Gilbert's Comedy and Tragedy as well as in Romeo and Juliet in 1884.

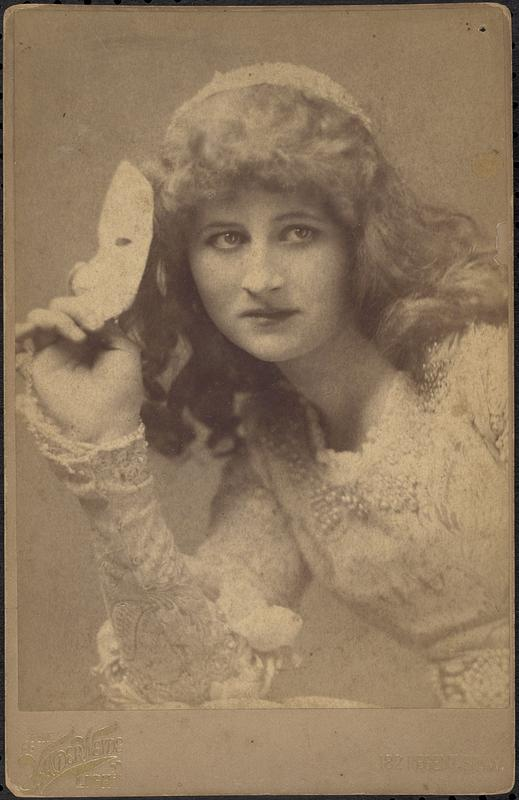
Anderson as Juliet, 1880s

In 1887 in London she appeared in The Winter's Tale in the double role of Perdita and Hermione (the first actress to include this innovation). This production ran for 160 performances and was taken back to the United States. In 1889, she collapsed on stage due to severe nervous exhaustion during a performance at Albaugh's Theatre in Washington. Disbanding her company, she announced her retirement at the age of 30. Some commentators, particularly in the British press, ascribed this decision to hostile press reviews on her return to the U.S. The author Willa Cather blamed a specifically hurtful review from a close friend.

For part of her career, Napier Lothian Jr. served as Anderson's talent manager.

== Retirement and film career ==
Ordered to rest after her breakdown, Anderson visited England. On June 17, 1890, Anderson married Antonio Fernando de Navarro (c. 1861–1932), an American practicing as a barrister in England. The couple settled at Court Farm in the Cotswolds, Broadway, Worcestershire, where she cultivated an interest in music. As Mary Anderson de Navarro, she became a noted hostess with a distinguished circle of musical, literary and ecclesiastical guests. She gave birth to three children, a son who died at birth, another son, José Maria de Navarro, and a daughter, Mary Elena de Navarro.

A devout Roman Catholic, she had a chapel built in her attic, with stained-glass windows designed by Paul Woodroffe. She has been cited as a model for characters in the Mapp and Lucia novels by E. F. Benson, either the operatic soprano Olga Bracely or Lucia herself, as well as the prototype for the heroine of William Black's novel The Strange Adventures of a House-Boat.

She resisted a return to the theatre but did a number of fund-raising performances during World War I in Worcester, Stratford and London. The latter included roles as Galatea, Juliet and Clarice in Comedy and Tragedy. She published two books of her memories, A Few Memories (1896) and A Few More Memories (1936), and collaborated with Robert Smythe Hichens on a 1911 New York stage adaptation of his novel, The Garden of Allah.

From 1912 to 1918, she made a dozen silent films.

== Death and legacy ==
Anderson died at her home in Broadway, Worcestershire, in 1940, aged 80.

The Mary Anderson Theatre was the oldest theatre on Louisville's 4th Street. It opened in 1907 as a vaudeville house, but two years later it began to screen movies. The theatre closed in 1972 and was converted into office space. Land donated by Anderson in Mount St. Francis, Indiana, to the Conventual Franciscan Friars is now the Mount Saint Francis Center for Spirituality. The center serves as the headquarters for the Province of Our Lady of Consolation and home to the Mary Anderson Center, an artist colony. In 1989, the portion of U.S. Route 150 that adjoins the donated property was named the Mary Anderson Memorial Highway.

The house and farm that Mary and Antonio de Navarro purchased and extended in the town of Broadway, Court Farm, is recognised as hosting one of the best preserved Edwardian gardens. The property was left to her son, Toty de Navarro, who lived there with his wife, Dorothy, their son Michael and Dorothy's long-time Cambridge friend, Gertrude Caton Thompson. As in the years when Mary lived there, it was often filled with visiting artists and musicians, including Myra Hess and a young Jacqueline du Pré.

== Performances ==
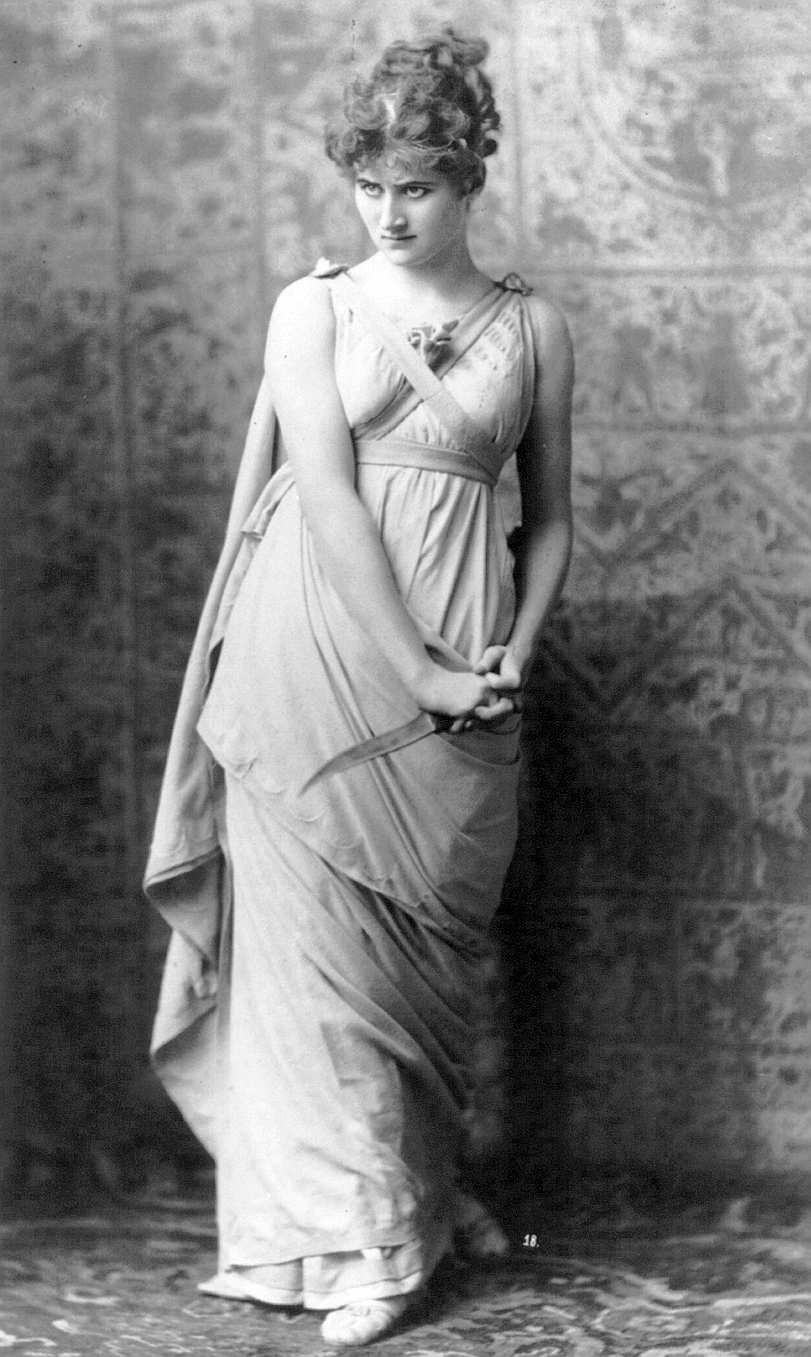
As Parthenia in Friedrich Halm's Ingomar the Barbarian, 1883

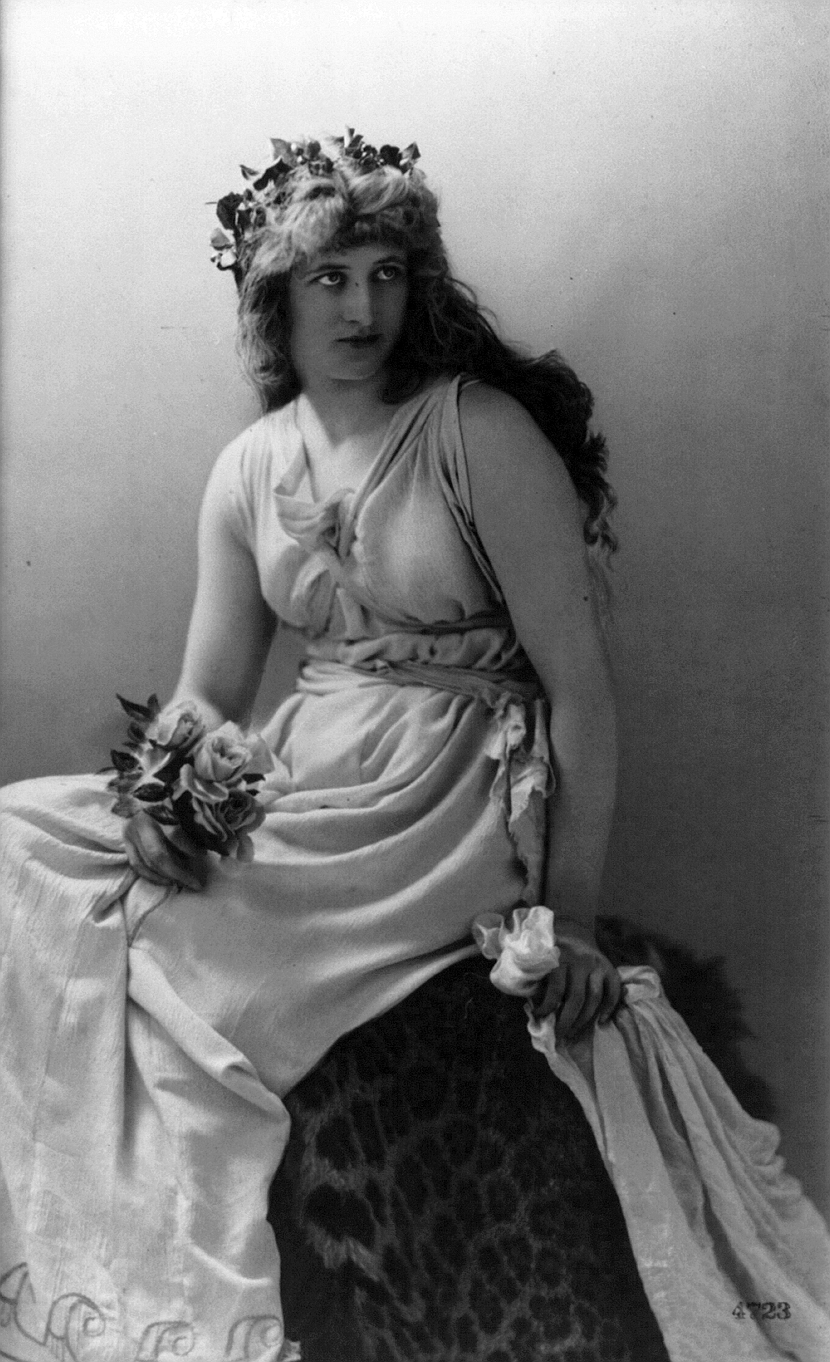
As Perdita in Shakespeare's The Winter's Tale, 1887

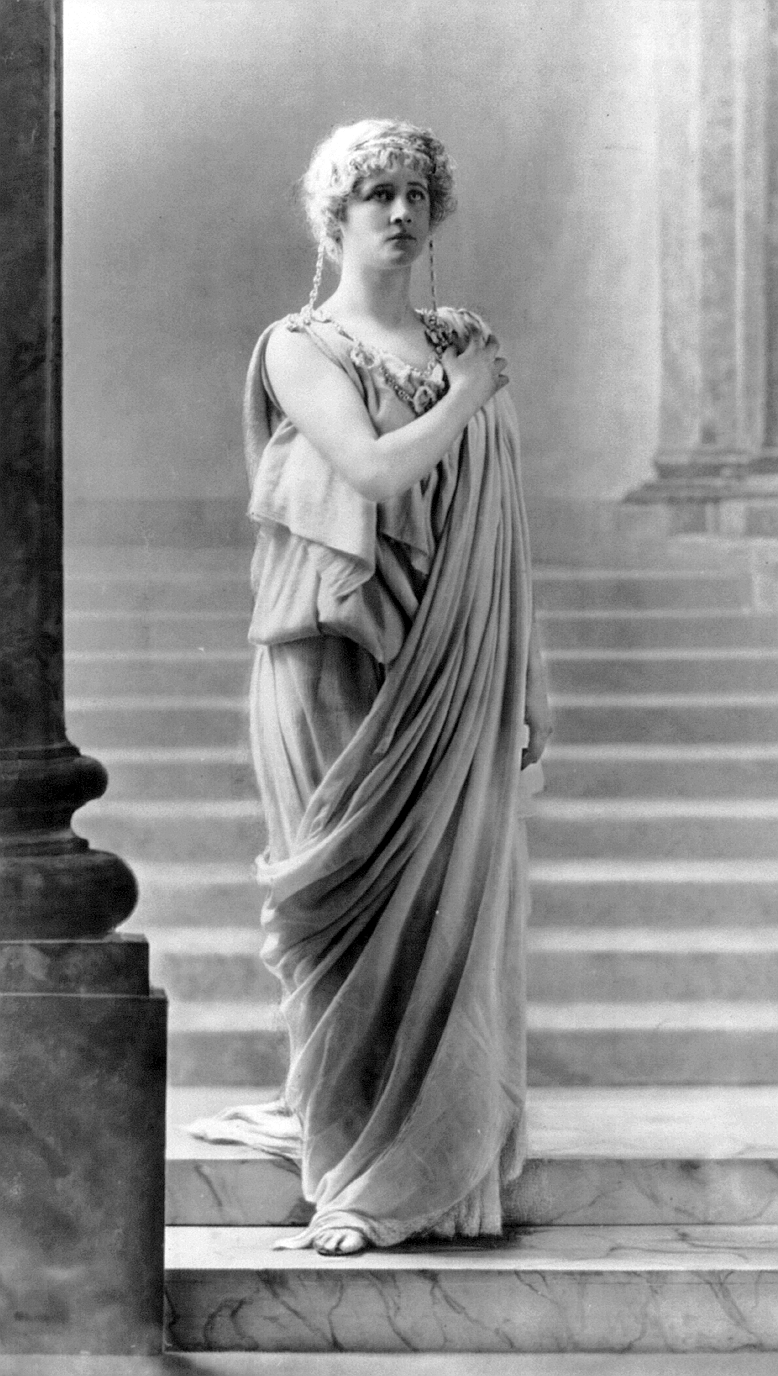
As Hermione in The Winter's Tale, 1887

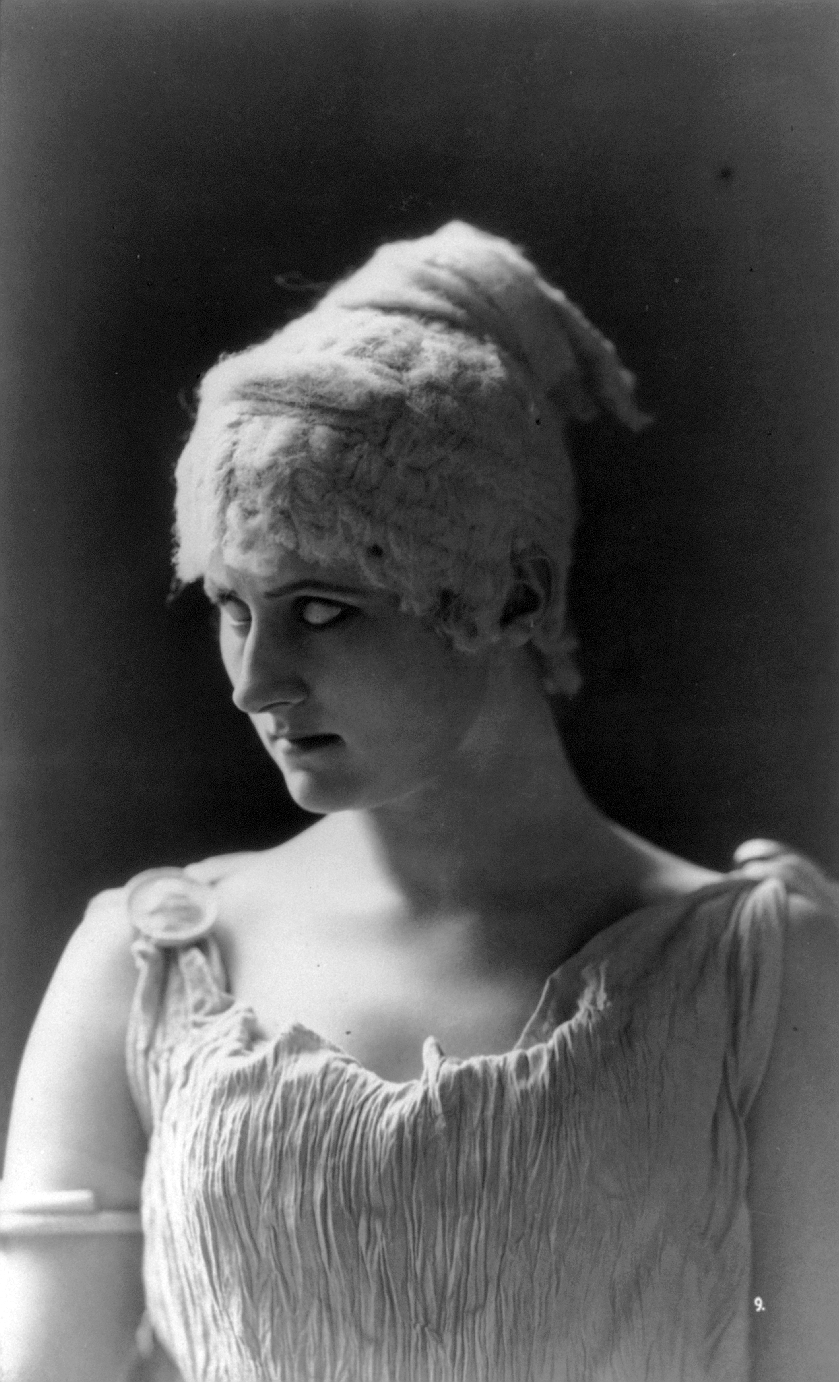
As Galatea in Gilbert's Pygmalion and Galatea, 1883

== Filmography ==
Year	Film	Role	Notes
1912	Bridge	Mrs. Gray	Short
1912	The Days of Terror; or, in the Reign of Terror	—N/a	Short
1912	Babette	Babette	Short
1912	The Night Before Christmas	Aunt Ruth - Mrs. Corbin's Sister (as Miss Navarro)	Short
1912	Days of Terror	—N/a	Short
1913	Cinderella's Slipper	—N/a	Short
1914	Hearts of Oak	Aunt Becky	
1914	When Broadway Was a Trail	Mistress Hibbins	
1915	The Battle of Ballots	—N/a	
1916	Diana the Huntress	Unknown (as Mary Navarra)	Short
1918	Mrs. Dane's Defense	Mrs. Dane of Canada	
1918	Eve's Daughter	Kate Simpson-Bates	Final film role

== References and sources ==
Sources

- Donald Roy, "Anderson, Mary (1859–1940)", Oxford Dictionary of National Biography, Oxford University Press, 2004
- Winter Stage Life of Mary Anderson (1886)
