= Hoodman Blind =

1923 film directed by John Ford

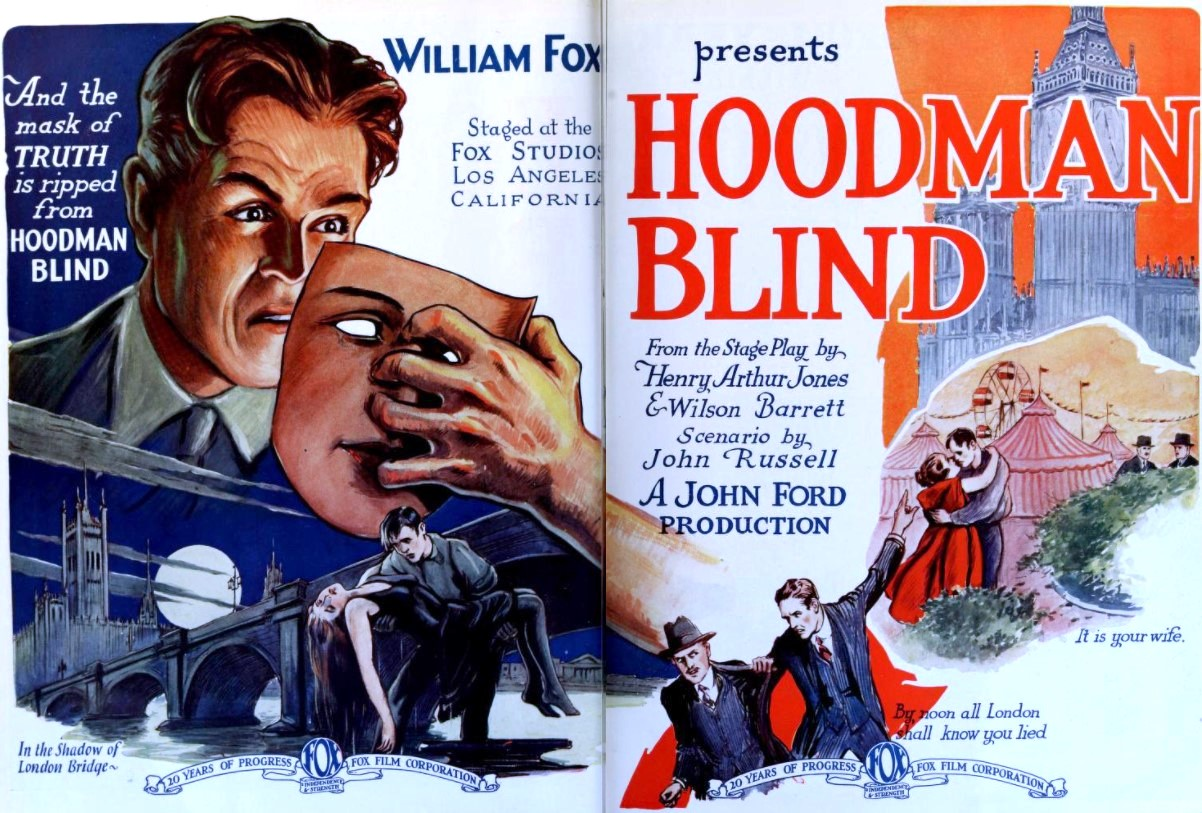
- Trade advertisement
- Directed by: John Ford
- Written by: Charles Kenyon
- Based on: Hoodman Blind by Wilson Barrett and Henry Arthur Jones
- Starring: David Butler; Gladys Hulette
- Cinematography: George Schneiderman
- Distributed by: Fox Film Corporation
- Release date: December 20, 1923
- Running time: 60 minutes
- Country: United States
- Language: Silent (English intertitles)

Hoodman Blind is a 1923 American silent drama film directed by John Ford. It is a remake of a 1913 film of the same name directed by James Gordon and a 1916 William Farnum Fox feature titled A Man of Sorrow and based on the play Hoodman Blind.

== Plot ==
As described in a film magazine review, John Linden, a victim of wanderlust, jumbles up his life and that of his two daughters. One is a daughter by marriage, the other an offspring of Jessie Walton, a young woman of the village. Noting the resemblance of the two, unscrupulous Mark Lezzard, the sea town's only lawyer, arouses the jealousy of the first daughter's husband Jack Yeulette, the skipper of a fishing smack, hoping to gain her for himself and thereby obtain control over the money John provides for her on a regular basis. After much havoc, happiness is the lot of everyone except Lezzard, whom the crowd "fixes" when they learn of what a wretch he is.

== Cast ==
- David Butler as Jack Yeulette
- Gladys Hulette as Nancy Yeulette / Jessie Walton
- Regina Connelly as Jessie Walton (the first)
- Frank Campeau as Mark Lezzard
- Marc McDermott as John Linden
- Trilby Clark as Mrs. John Linden
- Jack Walters as Bull Yeaman
- Eddie Gribbon as Battling Brown

== Preservation ==
With no prints of Hoodman Blind located in any film archives, it is a lost film.

== See also ==
- List of lost films
- List of Fox Film films
