= EM Gardner =

American-born British photographer (1882–1959)

E M Gardner
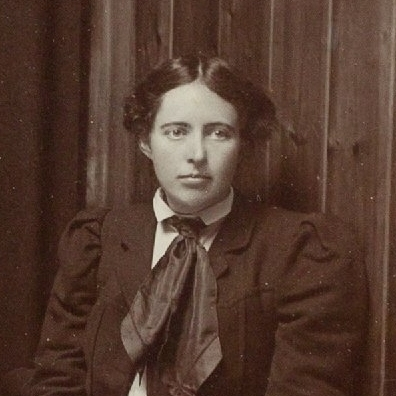
- Born: Emilie Montgomery Gardner; 30 September 1882; New Haven, Connecticut, U.S.
- Died: 8 April 1959 (aged 76); Chichester, England, UK
- Education: Newnham College
- Occupations: Teacher and civil servant

E M Gardner OBE was the name used by Emilie Montgomery Gardner (30 September 1882 – 8 April 1959). She was an American-born British photographer and a British suffragist. In later life she took to photographing notable buildings. About 1,800 of her photographs are held by Historic England. They will be in copyright until 2030 when they will be unprotected and freely available.

== Life ==
Gardner was born in New Haven in Connecticut in 1882. About ten years later her family moved to the Black Country. It was intended to be a temporary move so that her father could establish a factory in Birmingham, but their plans changed and they stayed in England. Her younger sister, Elinor Wight Gardner, was a leading British geologist.

She was a member of the National Union of Women's Suffrage Societies (NUWSS) from 1900. Gardner attended Newnham College from 1904 and she became the President of the joint NUWSS society that involved students from Newnham and from its sister college, Girton. Newnham was one of the few women's colleges that were part of Cambridge University. The students were allowed to take classes and identical exams to male students but they were denied a Cambridge degree irrespective of their success. She completed her time in Newnham in 1907, but she was involved in the 1908 suffrage tour.

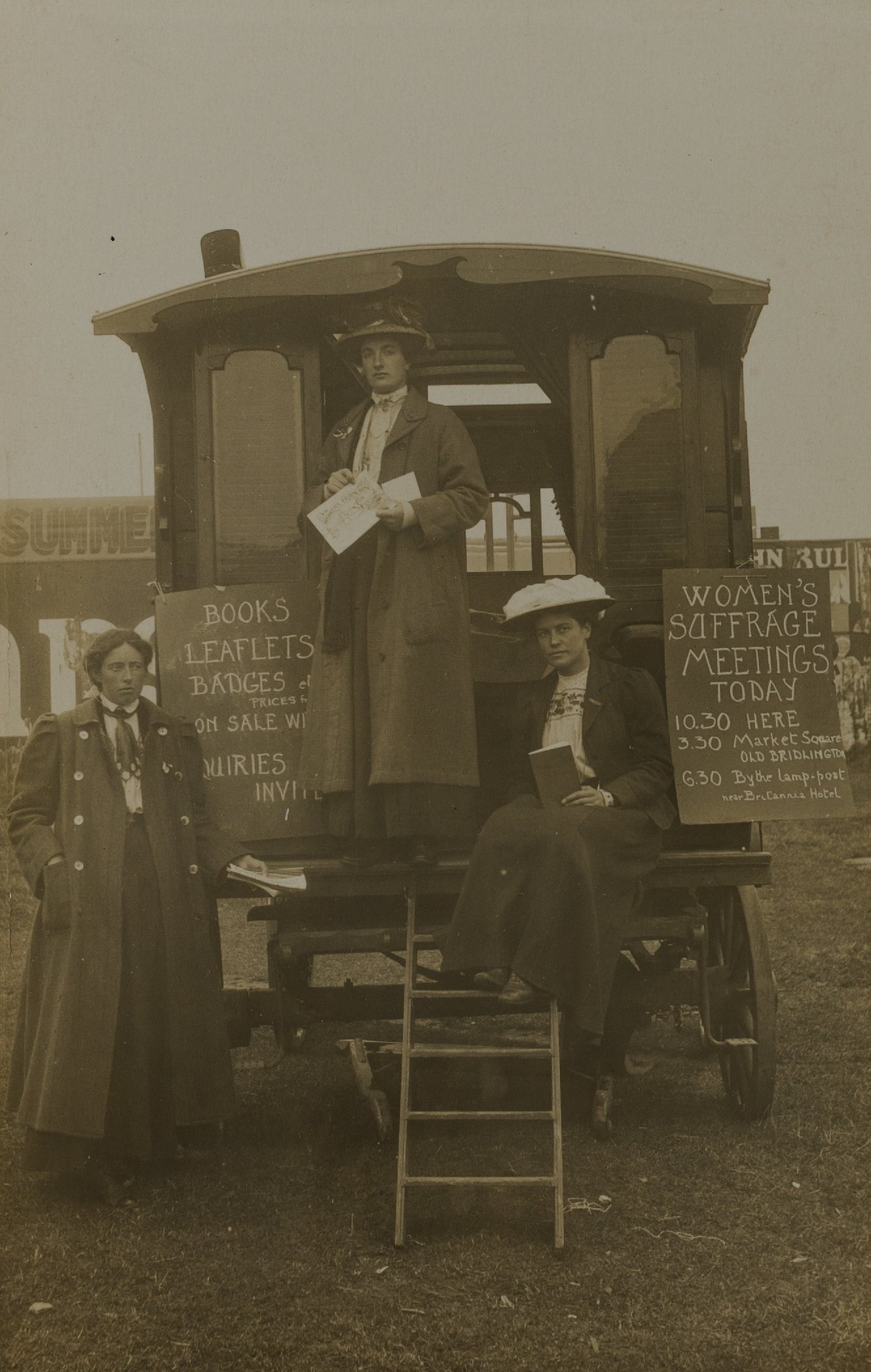
Gardner on the left during the Caravan Tour at Bridlington in 1908

In 1908 a caravan tour was organised that began in Scotland. The caravan was pulled by a horse and driven by a man. The caravan travelled from place to place and would be redirected to good places to stay by some outriders who used their own bicycles. The caravan had camp beds and a tent that allowed five or six to sleep. They toured Keswick, Bridlington and the north of England and would give talks about women's suffrage. The caravan visited Oxford, Stratford and Warwick. They argued the case for women to get the vote, but avoided the question of women members of parliament as this was too radical. The women on the caravan included Ray Strachey and Gardner. The tour finished in the East Midlands at Derby where they attracted a crowd of 1,000 people.

In 1912 she became a British citizen.

After the first world war, some British women were allowed to vote, subject to both age and property ownership, and in 1928 all women over the age of 21 were allowed to vote.

In the 1942 Birthday Honours Gardner was awarded an OBE for her work in the civil service.

Gardner was keen on buildings and was particularly interested in watermills. She persuaded the Society for the Protection of Ancient Buildings to take more interest and as a result the Windmill Section became the Wind and Watermill Section in 1946. Throughout most of the 1950s she was on the section's committee.

== Death and legacy ==
Gardner died in Chichester on 8 April 1959 after a minor operation at the local hospital. About 1,800 of her photographs are held by Historic England. They will be out of copyright in 2030. Her mill notes and photographs are held by The Mills Archive Trust.
