= Dorothy de Navarro =

- Born: Agnes Dorothy MacKenzie Hoare; 31 July 1901; Inverness, Scotland
- Died: 16 April 1987 (aged 85); Broadway, Worcestershire, England
- Spouse: José Maria de Navarro (m. 1940; died 1977)
- Children: 1
- Relatives: Mary Anderson (mother-in-law)

Academic background
- Education: University of Aberdeen; Newnham College, Cambridge
- Thesis: The Works of Morris and Yeats in Relation to Early Saga Literature (1929)
- Doctoral advisor: Nora K. Chadwick

Academic work
- Institutions: Department of Anglo-Saxon, Norse and Celtic, University of Cambridge
- Notable students: Rachel Bromwich

Agnes Dorothy MacKenzie de Navarro (née Hoare; 31 July 1901 – 16 April 1987) was a British lecturer at the University of Cambridge, who specialised in Anglo-Saxon literature.

== Early life and education ==
De Navarro was born Agnes Dorothy MacKenzie Hoare on 31 July 1901 in Inverness. Educated at the Inverness Royal Academy, Hoare took her B.A. at University of Aberdeen with First Class Honours in English and a gold medal. She took her M.A. in 1923.

She earned a Carnegie Fellowship from Aberdeen to continue her studies at the University of Cambridge from 1926 to 1929, residing in Newnham College. She took her PhD from Cambridge in 1929. Under the supervision of Nora K. Chadwick, Hoare's thesis was entitled The Works of Morris and Yeats in Relation to Early Saga Literature.

== Career ==
She worked in the Department of Anglo-Saxon and Kindred Studies at Cambridge, where she taught early medieval literature, as an Assistant Lecturer from 1930 to 1932 and Lecturer of English from 1932 to 1949, retiring in 1956. She held positions at Newnham including member of council 1935–1941, 1951–1952 and Secretary 1936–1941. She was an Associate Fellow of Newnham from 1950 to 1952. She was a member of the faculty boards of English, Archaeology and Anthropology from 1936 to 1956.

De Navarro supervised Rachel Bromwich as an undergraduate. Bromwich would go on to be an academic herself, publishing a "seminal" edition of the Welsh Triads, Trioedd Ynys Prydein, in 1961.

The Broadway Trust was established in 1963, to preserve the village of Broadway in the Cotswolds where the De Navarro home was located. Their home, Court Farm, remains a significant cultural landmark, containing a rare preserved Edwardian garden.

== Personal life ==
In 1940, Hoare married José Maria de Navarro (1896–1979), an archaeologist, prehistorian and classical scholar. The couple had one son.

De Navarro met Gertrude Caton-Thompson, a famed archaeologist, while both resided at Cambridge. They became good friends, and shared a house, along with Dorothy's husband Toty. After De Navarro retired from teaching, Caton-Thompson moved with the De Navarro family to their home in Broadway, Worcestershire in 1956, which would become their shared home until their respective deaths. It would become a popular destination for writers and musicians to visit, as it had been during Toty De Navarro's youth when his mother, the actor Mary Anderson, had first lived there.

De Navarro donated a 1882 platinotype cabinet card of Sir Edward Burne-Jones by Frederick Hollyer to the National Portrait Gallery, London.

On 16 April 1987, De Navarro died in Broadway, Worcestershire.

== Publications ==
- Hoare, Dorothy M. (1937). The Works of Morris and Yeats in Relation to Early Saga Literature. Cambridge: Cambridge University Press.
- Hoare, Dorothy M. (1938). Some Studies In The Modern Novel. London: Chatto & Windus.
