= Mrs. Dane's Defence (1933 film) =

- Directed by: A. V. Bramble
- Written by: Kenelm Foss; Lydia Hayward; Henry Arthur Jones (play)
- Produced by: Harry Rowson
- Starring: Joan Barry; Basil Gill; Francis James
- Production company: National Talkies
- Distributed by: Paramount British Pictures
- Release date: 30 November 1933
- Running time: 67 minutes
- Country: United Kingdom
- Language: English

Mrs. Dane's Defence is a 1933 British drama film directed by A. V. Bramble and starring Joan Barry, Basil Gill and Francis James. It was an adaptation of the 1900 play Mrs Dane's Defence by Henry Arthur Jones. The play had previously been adapted into an American silent film.

It was made at Wembley Studios as a quota quickie for release by the British subsidiary of Paramount Pictures.

== Cast ==
- Joan Barry as Mrs Dane
- Basil Gill as Sir Daniel Carteret
- Francis James as Lionel Carteret
- Ben Field as Mr Bulsom-Porter
- Clare Greet as Mrs Bulsom-Porter
- Evan Thomas as James Risby
- Evelyn Walsh Hall as Lady Eastney

== Bibliography ==
- Low, Rachael. Filmmaking in 1930s Britain. George Allen & Unwin, 1985.
- Wood, Linda. British Films, 1927-1939. British Film Institute, 1986.
