= The Silver King (play) =

1882 play by Henry Herman and Henry Arthur Jones

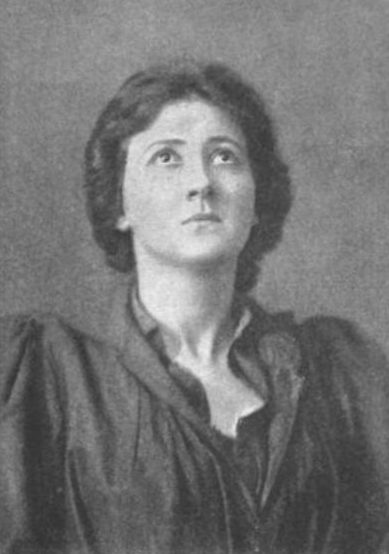
Maud Jeffries as Nellie Denver

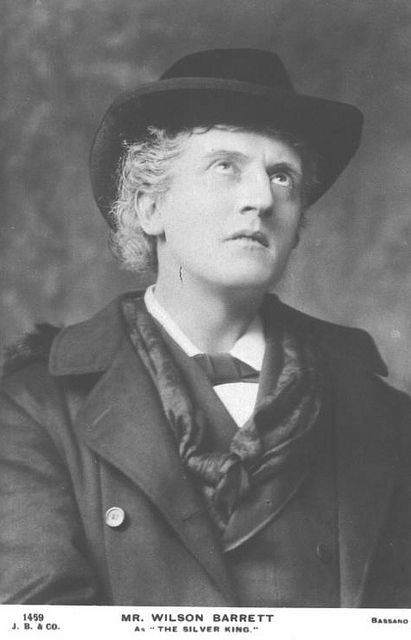
Wilson Barrett as Wilfred Denver

The Silver King is an 1882 melodramatic play, by Henry Arthur Jones and Henry Herman. It was "so well known that criticism is superfluous" and played to record-breaking audiences. It was adapted for films in 1919 and 1929. The play featured stars such as Mary Pickford.

The play was serialised for Australian radio in 1941 with a cast including Harvey Adams and Ron Randell. It was dramatised as a 90-minute play for the BBC Home Service (now BBC Radio 4) in 1964, starring Sir Donald Wolfit as Wilfred Denver.
