= The Liars (play) =

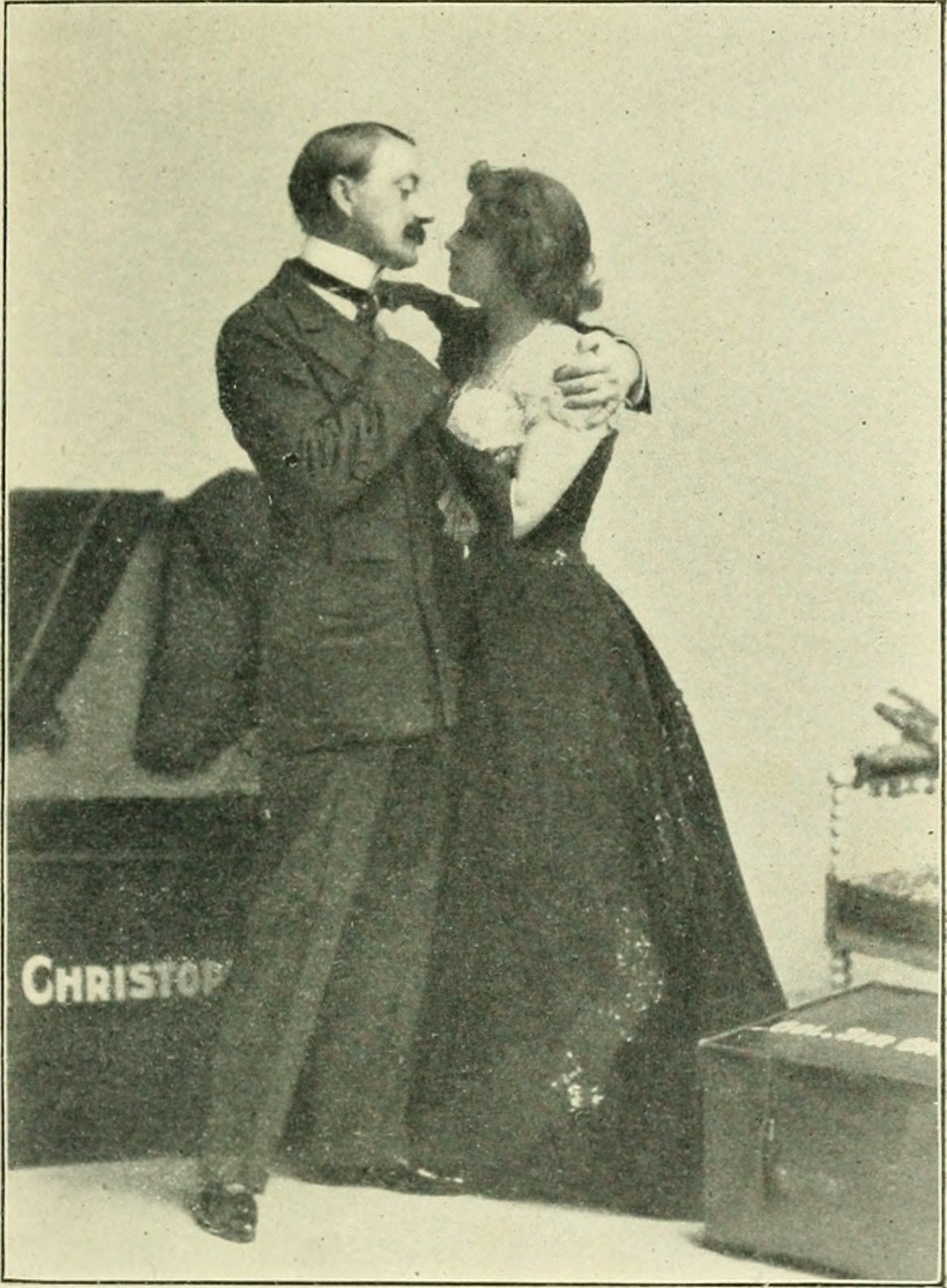
John Drew Jr and Blanche Burton in the Broadway production of The Liars (1898)

The Liars is an English play by Henry Arthur Jones that was first performed in London in 1897.

== Summary ==
Lady Jessica Nepean is fond of flirtation, not so much because she is dissatisfied with her husband, Gilbert, as because it flatters her vanity to keep other men dangling. At the houseparty of her sister, Lady Rosamund Tatton, her flirtation with Edward Falkner, a recently returned South African hero, is the theme of conversation. Everyone insists that Sir Christopher Deering (who had socially stood sponsor for Falkner) must reason him out of his infatuation for Lady Jessica before her husband realizes what she does. The women of the party also attempt to reason with Lady Jessica.

Both attempts, however, are foredoomed. Falkner is desperately in love with Lady Jessica. Lady Jessica is enjoying his ardor immensely, and still believes she can end it with a word. Business calls Gilbert Nepean away, so when the houseparty breaks up Lady Jessica keeps an appointment to have dinner with Falkner at the inn where he is staying. Her husband's brother, George, accidentally comes upon her there and, putting the worst possible construction on it, feels himself bound to wire Gilbert to return at once.

Lady Jessica happens to see Rosamund and Freddie rowing down the river, and manages to get her sister into the inn. In hopes to forestall George they write Gilbert a letter asking him to call at Lady Rosamund's town house the next morning for an explanation. About the time Gilbert is due, most of the other members of the houseparty turn up at Lady Rosamund's on some pretext or other. When Gilbert arrives, he is met with a most amazing barrage of lies. To complicate the situation, he has already seen a member of the houseparty on his way from the station, and by a chance remark of hers recognizes these subsequent explanations as lies. Finally when Lady Jessica sees that they are hopelessly involved, she bids Falkner tell the truth. By this time she imagines herself as much in love with him as he with her and is ready to run away with him.

Sir Christopher, however, is determined that his friend shall not sacrifice his brilliant career for a shallow woman. He manages to reconcile Lady Jessica and her husband by the simple process of blaming Gilbert for the whole affair. "In future," Sir Christopher advises, "flirt with your wife yourself if you don't want some other man to do it."

== Themes ==
Although the play is a sophisticated comedy that shows Jones' contact with London high society, the play displays a rigid acceptance of the Victorian moral code. After gaining prominence in melodrama, Jones contributed this play and The Case of Rebellious Susan 1894 as a Victorian "society" drama.
