= Ursuline Nuns of the Immaculate Conception =

The Ursuline Nuns of the Immaculate Conception (Ursuline Sisters of Louisville) are a Roman Catholic apostolic congregation of pontifical right, based in Louisville, Kentucky.

== History ==
Bishop Martin John Spalding of the Diocese of Louisville sent Father Leander Streber, OFM, pastor of St. Martin of Tours Church in Louisville, to Bavaria to seek sisters to teach the German children in the diocese. The congregation was founded in 1858 in Louisville, Kentucky by Mother Salesia Reitmeier, and two others sisters, all Ursulines, from Straubing, Bavaria. The following year they established the Ursuline Academy boarding school. By 1880, Ursuline Academy was taking day students, while boarders attended Sacred Heart Academy. (With decreased enrollment, Ursuline Academy was phased out in 1972.)

In 1874, the Ursulines took charge of Immaculate Conception School in Columbia, Illinois.

The motherhouse, which had been at the old Ursuline Academy of the Immaculate Conception on East Chestnut Street, moved to Lexington Road in 1877. The Ursuline Chapel of the Immaculate Conception was dedicated on Dec. 8, 1917. Although the sisters' work is primarily in education, in October 1918, fifteen went to nearby Camp Zachary Taylor to serve as nurses during the influenza epidemic. The Ursuline campus served as a refuge for people displaced by the Ohio River flood of 1937.

Sacred Heart Junior College and Normal School opened in 1921. In 1938, it became a four-year college, Ursuline College, which later merged with Bellarmine College in 1968.

The Ursuline campus includes Sacred Heart Academy (a high school for girls), Sacred Heart Model School (an elementary and middle school for boys and girls), Sacred Heart School for the Arts, Sacred Heart Preschool, and the Motherhouse Chapel. The campus serves about 1,800 students and underwent significant upgrades and modernization in 2016.

The congregation numbers more than 120 members; there are more than 15 houses in United States and Peru (2010).
