= Henry Herman =

English dramatist and novelist

Henry Herman (real name Henry Heydrac D'Arco, 1832–1894) was an English dramatist and novelist.

== Biography ==
He was born in Alsace, and educated at a military college. He emigrated to the United States, and served in the Confederate Army during the American Civil War, losing an eye as a result of a wound received in action.

Afterwards, he moved to London, and began to write for the stage. His first play, Jeanne Dubarry, was produced at the Charing Cross Theatre in May 1875, and was followed the next year by Slight Mistakes, a farce. In November 1882, was produced his first great success, The Silver King, written in collaboration with Henry Arthur Jones, with whom he also wrote Breaking a Butterfly (an adaptation of Henrik Ibsen's A Doll's House; 1884) and Chatterton (1884). He then wrote Claudian with William Gorman Wills (1884), and The Golden Band (1887) with Freeman Wills. He also wrote: For Old Virginia (1891); Eagle Joe (1892); and Fay o' Fire (1885), a romantic opera, for which Edward Jones composed the music.

Between 1887 and 1891 he wrote several novels in collaboration with David Christie Murray, such as: One Traveler Returns (1887); A Dangerous Catspaw (1889); The Bishops' Bible (1890); He Fell Among Thieves (1890); and Paul Jones's Alias (1891). He also wrote alone a large number of novels and short stories.

On 24 September 1894, he died at Gunnersbury. He was buried at Kensal Green cemetery.
