= Elinor Wight Gardner =

British geologist

- Born: September 24, 1892; Birmingham
- Died: 1980 (aged 87–88)

Academic background
- Education: Newnham College

Academic work
- Discipline: Geology
- Sub-discipline: Archeological surveys of Africa
- Institutions: Bedford College, London; Lady Margaret Hall, Oxford; Royal Botanic Garden Edinburgh

Elinor Wight Gardner (24 September 1892, in Birmingham – 1980), a geology lecturer at Bedford College, London and research fellow at Lady Margaret Hall, is best known for her field surveys with Gertrude Caton–Thompson of the Kharga Oasis which are now recognized as pioneering interdisciplinary research in Africa.

In 1925, Caton-Thompson and Gardner began the first archaeological survey of the northern Faiyum, where they sought to correlate ancient lake levels with archaeological stratification. They continued working in the Faiyum over the next two years for the Royal Anthropological Institute where they discovered two unknown Neolithic cultures. The pair also worked on prehistoric sites at Kharga Oasis in 1930. This led to research more broadly on the palaeolithic of north Africa, which Caton-Thompson published in 1952.

== Career ==
Gardner was educated at Edgbaston High School and took a Natural Science Tripos at Newnham College. She was a Cambridge Associate, 1926-1941. Her elder sister was the suffragist and photographer EM Gardner.

She was acting professor in 1917-1919 at Stellenbosch University in South Africa, later taking the role of geologist for the Faiyum Desert archaeological expeditions, 1926-1928, and then on the Kharga Oasis expedition, 1930-1933.

She lectured in geology at Bedford College, London, 1926-1930, and became a research fellow at Lady Margaret Hall, 1930-1936, and a British Federation of University Women senior international research fellow, 1937-1938.

She was assistant curator at the Royal Botanic Garden Edinburgh, 1938-1941, during the war became the director of vegetable production at Lady Margaret Hall and thereafter her positions were in horticulture.

== Bibliography ==
- Caton-Thompson, Gertrude; Gardner, Elinor Wight (1939), Climate, irrigation, and early man in the Hadhramaut, OCLC 421634
- Thompson, Gertrude Caton; Gardner, Elinor Wight; Huzayyin, Sulaiman A (1937), Lake Moeris, Imprimerie de l'Institut français d'archéologie orientale, OCLC 491995486
- Gardner, Elinor Wight (1935), Notes on a temple at ʻAin Amur in the Libyan Desert, Ancient Egypt, OCLC 43865641
- Caton-Thompson, Gertrude; Gardner, E W (1934), The desert Fayum, [London] Royal Anthropological Institute of Great Britain and Ireland, OCLC 3383842
- Caton-Thompson, Gertrude; Gardner, Elinor Wight (1932), The prehistoric geography of Kharga oasis, Geographic journal, [London], OCLC 43139634
- Gardner, E W (1932), Some lacustrine Mollusca from the Faiyum depression : a study in variation, Mémoires présentés à l'Institut égyptien, t. 18, Impr. de l'Institut français d'archéologie orientale, OCLC 8631347
