= José Maria de Navarro =

British–American archaeologist, prehistorian and classicist (1896–1979)

Alma José Maria "Toty" de Navarro FSA (26 September 1896, Wimbledon – 16 February 1979, Broadway, Worcestershire), also known as J. M. de Navarro and T. de Navarro, was a British–American archaeologist, prehistorian, poet and classical scholar. A fellow of Trinity College, Cambridge, De Navarro specialised in the European Iron Age. The son of the actress Mary Anderson, De Navarro married the Anglo-Saxon scholar Dorothy de Navarro in 1940.

== Publications ==
- De Navarro, J. M. (December 1925). "Prehistoric Routes between Northern Europe and Italy Defined by the Amber Trade". The Geographical Journal. 66 (6). London: Royal Geographical Society: 481–503.
- De Navarro, J. M. (1980). Collected poems. Cambridge: Rampant Lions Press.
