= A Man of Sorrow =

1916 film

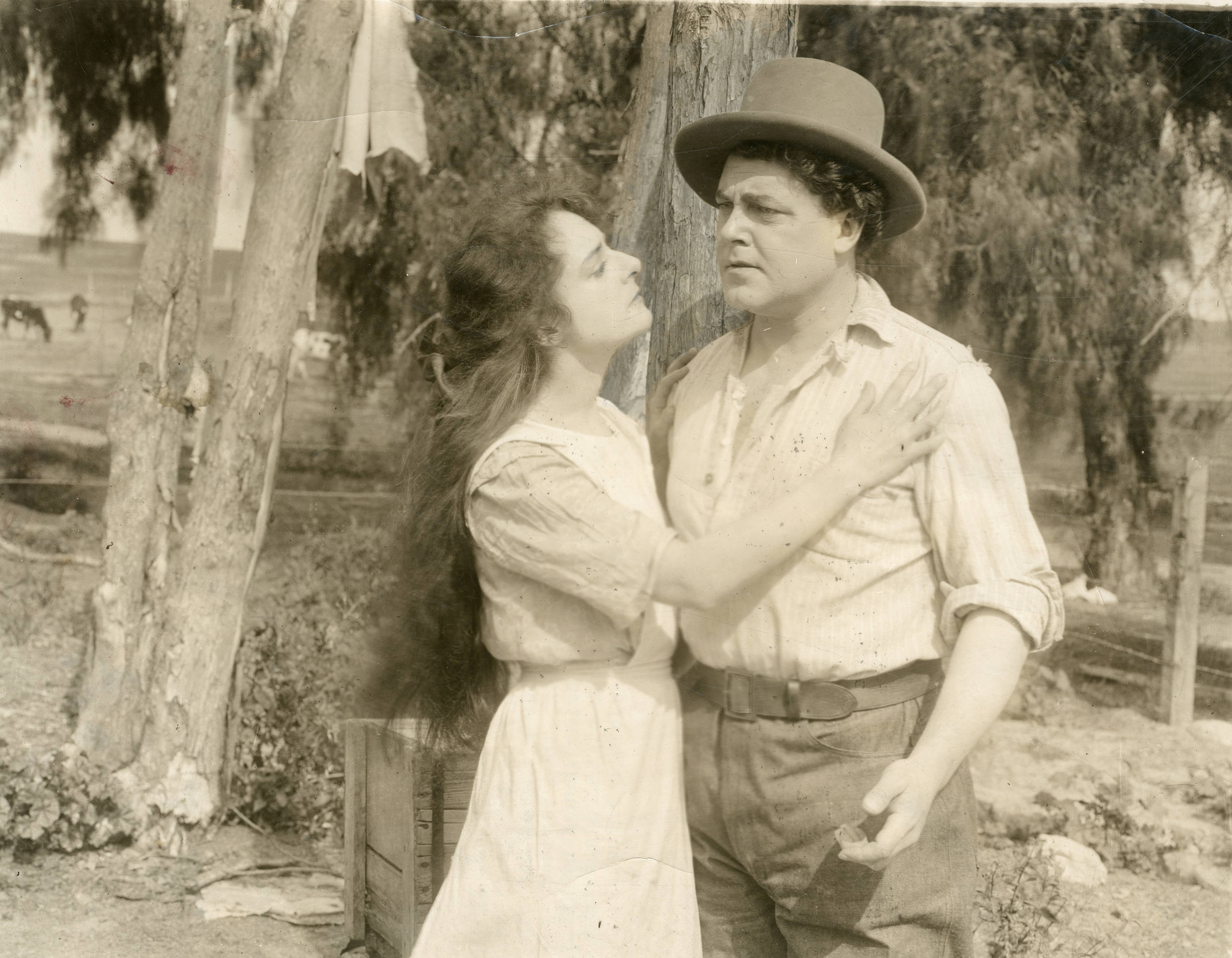
- Dorothy Bernard and William Farnum
- Directed by: Oscar Apfel
- Written by: Oscar Apfel (scenario)
- Based on: Hoodman Blind by Wilson Barrett
- Produced by: William Fox
- Starring: William Farnum; Dorothy Bernard
- Cinematography: Alfredo Gandolfi
- Distributed by: Fox Film Corporation
- Release date: April 23, 1916
- Running time: 60 minutes; 6 reels
- Country: United States
- Language: Silent (English intertitles)

A Man of Sorrow is a lost 1916 American drama film produced and distributed by Fox Film Corporation and starring William Farnum. Oscar Apfel directed and wrote the scenario based on a play, Hoodman Blind, by Wilson Barrett.

The same material was remade by John Ford in a 1923 film called by the title of its source material Hoodman Blind.

== Cast ==
- William Farnum
- Dorothy Bernard
- Willard Louis
- Mary Ruby
- Fred Huntley
- Harry DuRoy
- Henry J. Herbert (*aka Henry Hebert)
- William Burress
- Henry A. Barrows
- Thelma Burns
- William Scott
- Robert Wayne
- Mildred Halsey
- Jacob Abrams

== See also ==
- 1937 Fox vault fire
