= Sybil Carlisle =

British actress (1871–1951)

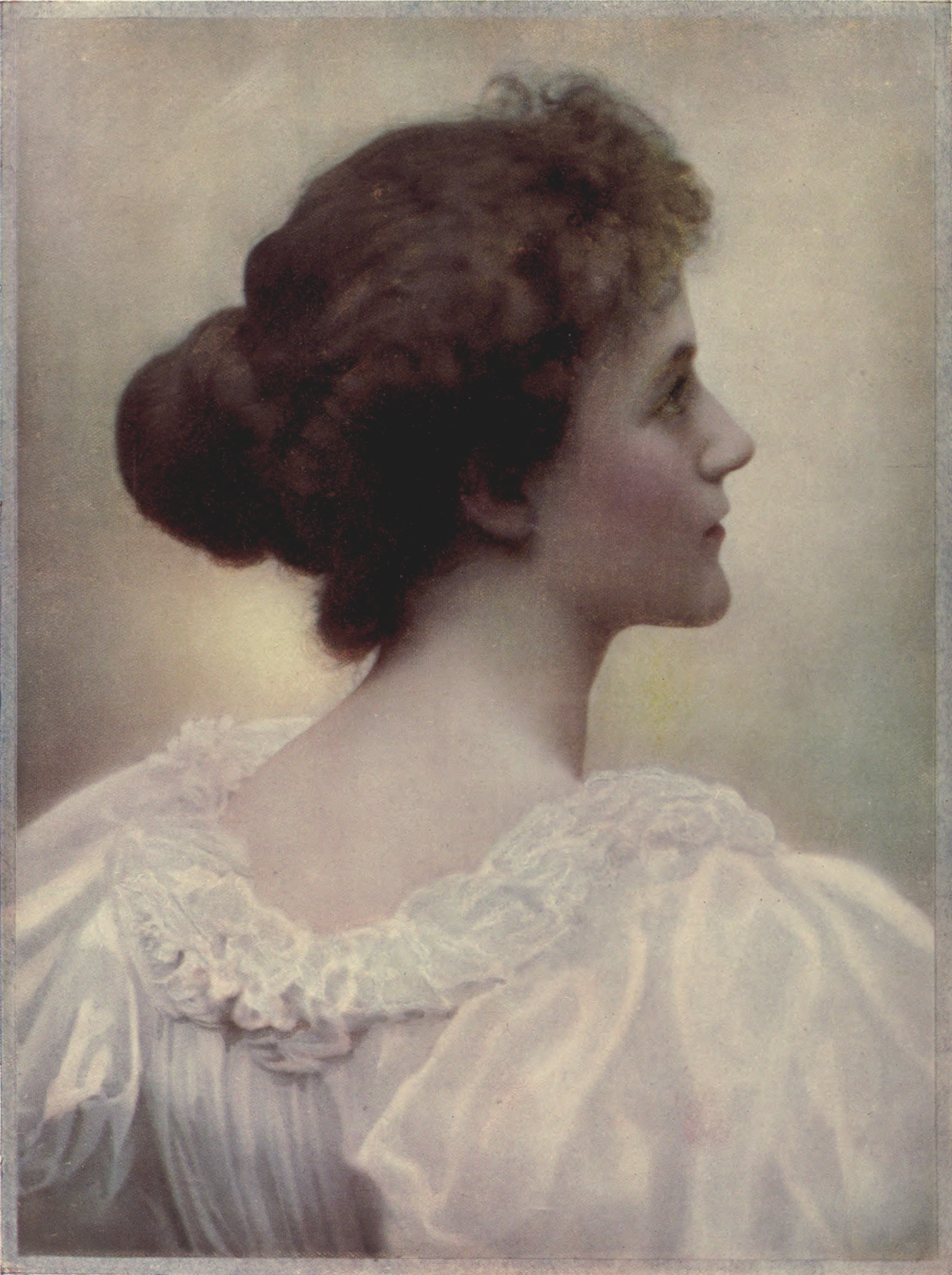
- Portrait of Sybil Carlisle between circa 1895 and circa 1900
- Born: 10 February 1871; Cape Colony, South Africa
- Died: 1951 (aged 79–80); England
- Occupation: Actress
- Parents: Mr. Carlisle; Mrs. M A Carlisle Carr
- Relatives: Mary Helen Carlisle (sister); Lieutenant Carlisle (brother); General Sir John Bisset (grandfather)

Sybil Carlisle (10 February 1871 – 1951) was a British actress born in South Africa who was active in both England and the United States during the 19th and 20th centuries.

== Early life ==
Carlisle was born on 10 February 1871 in Cape Colony, South Africa, daughter of Mr Carlisle and Mrs M.A. Carlisle Carr, a singing instructor and musician. She was the sister of Lieutenant Carlisle, who gained fame during the Second Boer War, and of painter Mary Helen Carlisle. Her grandfather was General Sir John Bisset.

Carlisle's parents had moved to South Africa from England after they got married and before Carlisle was born. After her father died, Carlisle and her mother moved back to England. Her mother remarried and supported her daughter by giving singing lessons.

Carlisle appears to have been unwilling to share details of her early life once her stage career started, forgoing any mentions of her origins in early editions of Who's Who in the Theatre. It was only in later editions where she shared her date and place of birth.

== Career ==
Carlisle's first dramatic appearance was in January 1891 playing Emily Pettibone in All the Comforts of Home. The performance took place at the Globe under the management of Norman Forbes. She then was an understudy at the Royal Court Theatre with Mrs. John Wood until July 1891 when she began her engagement with Charles Wyndham. Wyndham appointed her as the understudy of Mary Moore in all of her parts at the Criterion Theatre for at least two years. Wyndham also assigned Carlisle the title role in Miss Decima during the absence of lead actress Juliette Nesville, and Carlisle went on to tour the play with the Criterion company for three months. She served under Wyndham for nearly two years.

After playing the main part of Persis Harrison in Gudgeons in 1893 at Terry's Theatre, she was offered training by the playwright Augustin Daly, which lasted for two years. Daly saw promise in Carlisle's skill at playing small characters with "buoyancy and attractiveness". He encouraged Carlisle to join his company and she subsequently took part in many notable revivals of Daly's revivals, both in England (including the 1896 London season) and United States (beginning in the New York City 1894–5 season). These included The School for Scandal, Lucetta in The Two Gentlemen of Verona, Oberon in A Midsummer Night's Dream, and Love on Crutches. Lawrence Boyle described these performances as bringing "an English winsomeness to the smart and spruce American surroundings". Carlisle then joined George Edwardes's company where she appeared in My Girl at the Garrick Theatre. As a result of her successful performances in the United States, Carlisle earned the description of "The Maude Adams of England". Carlisle's subsequent theatrical appearances included Madame Polenta in Betsy, and Poppy Jannaway in My Friend the Prince.

Carlisle was a vocalist as well as an actor, having studied the voice with her mother. In 1889 she performed in a concert held by her mother under the patronage of Princess Christian at Prince's Hall.

== Personal life ==
Carlisle first met novelist and playwright John Galsworthy whilst they acted together in a production of T. W. Robertson's Caste when Carlisle was around 16 years old. It was reported that after this meeting, Galsworthy fell in love with Carlisle, although she did not return his feelings. It is possible that Galsworthy's romantic feelings towards Carlisle resulted in his detachment from his career in law and prompted his father to send him abroad.

== Death ==
Carlisle died in the summer of 1951. At the time she was living in Kensington and suffering from arthritis.
