= Mrs Dane's Defence (play) =

Society play by Henry Arthur Jones

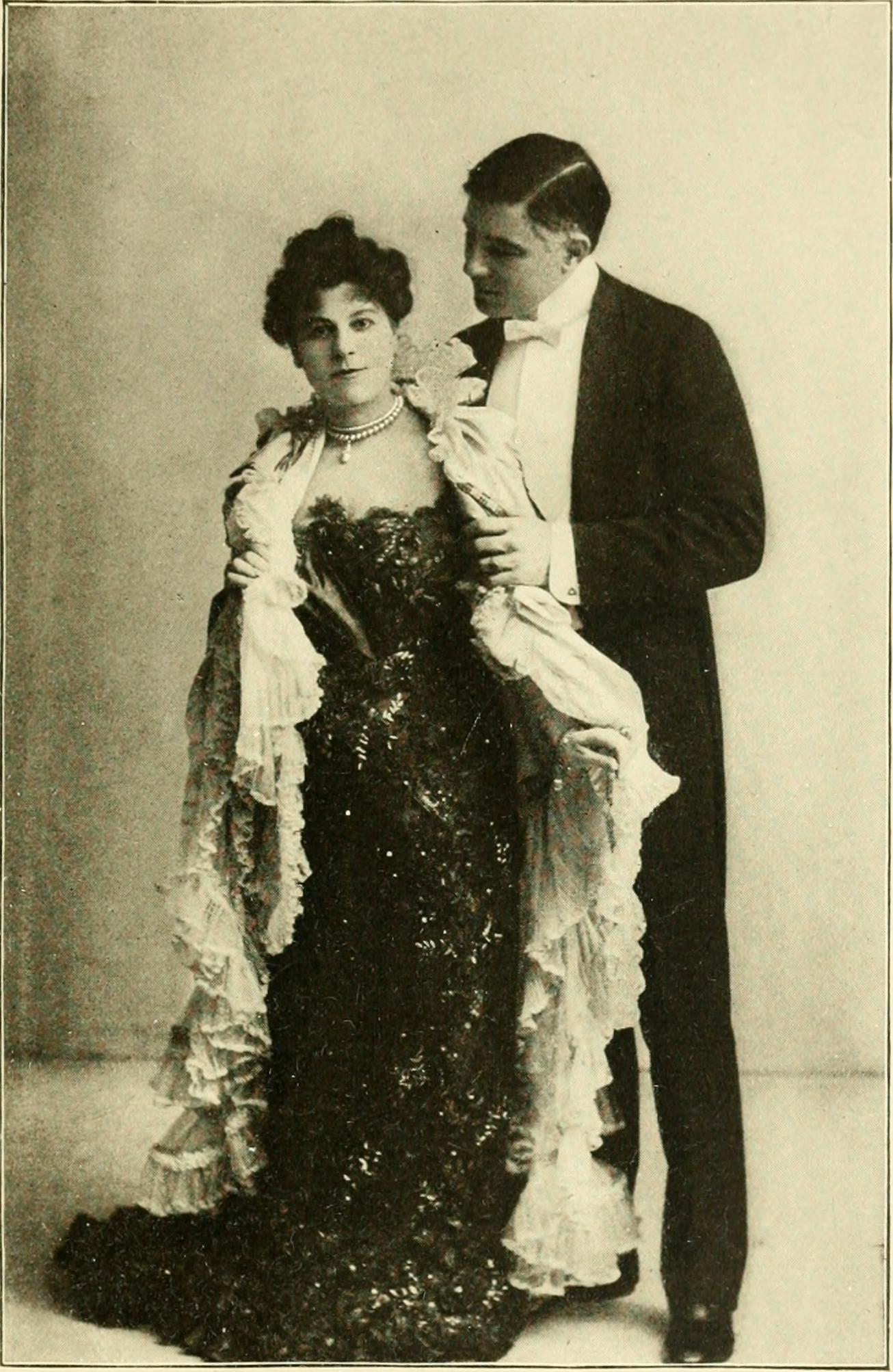
Jessie Millward (Lady Eastney) and Charles Richman (Sir Daniel Carteret) in the 1900 Broadway production of Mrs. Dane's Defence

Mrs. Dane's Defence is a society play (though it has some characteristics of a melodrama) in four acts by the British playwright Henry Arthur Jones.

== First performance ==
The play was first performed at London's Wyndham's Theatre on 9 October 1900 and ran for 209 performances. The original cast included Charles Wyndham as Sir Daniel Carteret, Mary Moore as Lady Eastney and Lena Ashwell as Mrs. Dane (her performance in this role launched Lena Ashwell's career). A touring cast played in the US from 31 December 1900 to April 1901.

== Structure and setting ==
The play has four acts. All the action takes place in the imaginary village of Sunningwater, about twenty-five miles from London. The first and second acts are set in the blue drawing room at Lady Eastney's, two or three weeks apart. The third and fourth acts are set in the library at Sir Daniel Carteret's on the following Wednesday afternoon and Saturday evening.

== Plot ==
The story focuses on Mrs. Dane's betrothal to Lionel, adopted son of Sir Daniel who is a famous judge.

Rumours have been spread in Sunningwater that young widow Mrs. Dane is actually Felicia Hindermarsh, involved in a tragic scandal following an affair with a married man in Vienna. Before Sir Daniel consents to the marriage, he attempts to put down the rumours and clear Mrs. Dane's reputation. With others, such as Lady Eastney, he starts looking into Mrs. Dane's past, guided by his experience as a judge.

Mrs. Dane produces plausible evidence of her identity and everyone involved is quite convinced of her innocence. Yet in the end Sir Daniel's professional approach exposes Mrs. Dane's real identity in a famous cross-examination scene.

Sir Daniel begins his examination convinced of her story, only wanting to get some final detail. A slip of the tongue by Mrs. Dane (when she says “We had governesses”) reveals the presence of a cousin she has tried to conceal. This sets Sir Daniel on the right track and he follows up skillfully and mercilessly, finally drawing the confession out of her that she is indeed Felicia Hindermarsh and has taken her late cousin's identity.

The truth is kept secret, though (mostly due to Lady Eastney's intervention), and Mrs. Dane's reputation in Sunningwater can be reinstated. Nevertheless, they all decide she should leave the village after her marriage with Lionel has become impossible and she complies.

== In perspective ==
The play follows under the late Victorian/Edwardian tradition of work by playwrights such as Arthur Wing Pinero, which feature a “fallen woman,” or “woman with a past,” who must be punished for past actions. Instead of dying or committing suicide, like many of the women in these plays (as in Pinero's famous play The Second Mrs. Tanqueray), Mrs. Dane is merely exiled to her hometown and the marriage called off.

== Reception ==
Mrs. Dane's Defence was generally well received, though the morals promoted may have seemed old-fashioned by young, more liberal audiences who had seen the plays of George Bernard Shaw or William Archer.

There are a number of cinema versions of Mrs. Dane's Defence. The first, a silent film in black and white, was released in 1918, directed by Hugh Ford, starring Pauline Frederick as Mrs. Dane, Frank Losee as Sir Daniel and Maude Turner Gordon as Lady Eastney. Another black and white film Mrs. Dane's Defence was produced by A.V. Bramble and released in 1933, starring Joan Barry as Mrs. Dane, Basil Gill as Sir Daniel and Evelyn Walsh Hall as Lady Eastney.
