= Hoodman Blind (play) =

1885 play by Wilson Barrett and Henry Arthur Jones

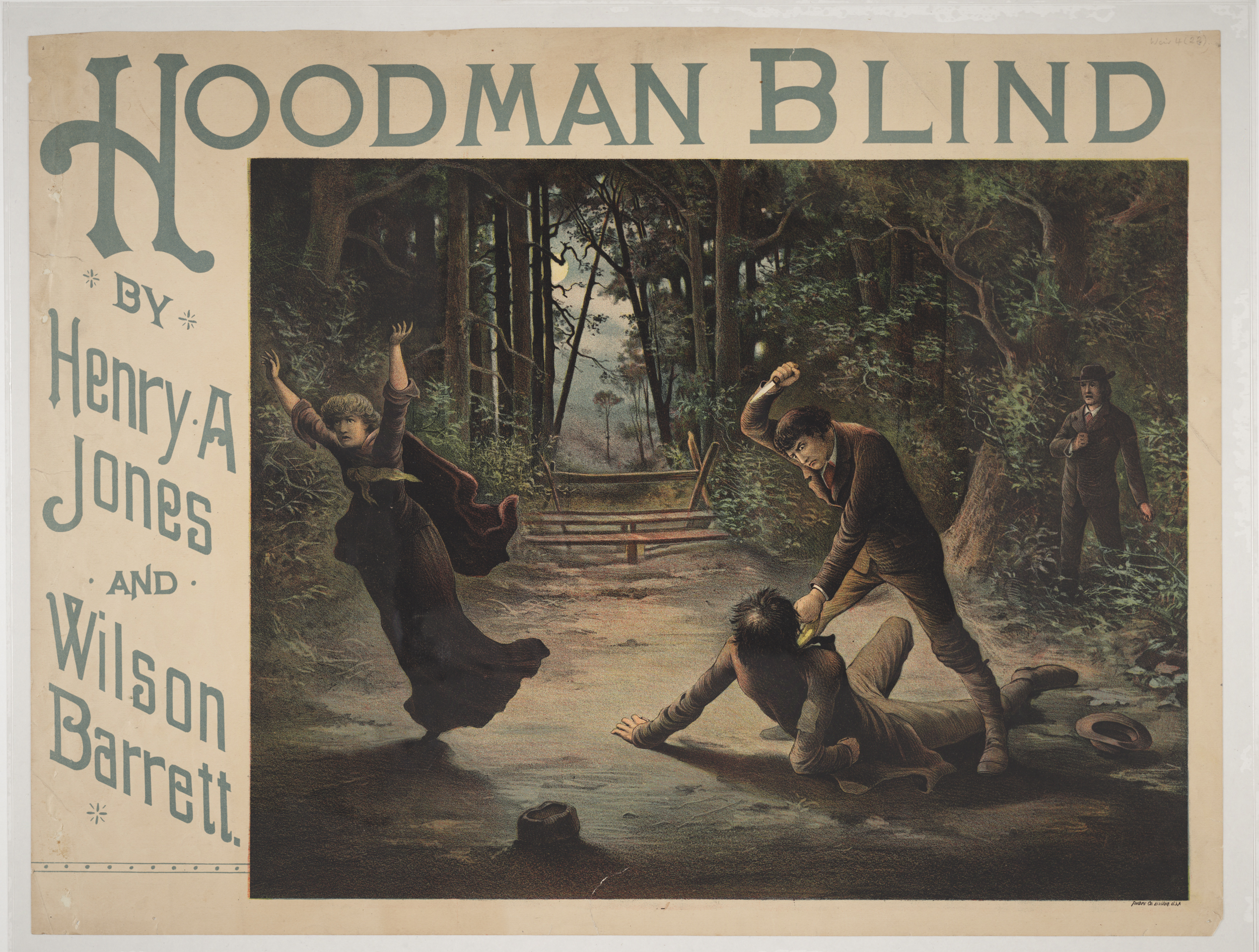
Poster for the play

Hoodman Blind is a melodrama of 1885, by Wilson Barrett and Henry Arthur Jones.

== Plot ==
A confused man blames some misdeeds on his wife. Actually they were committed by her lookalike sister.
