= Mrs. Dane's Defense (1918 film) =

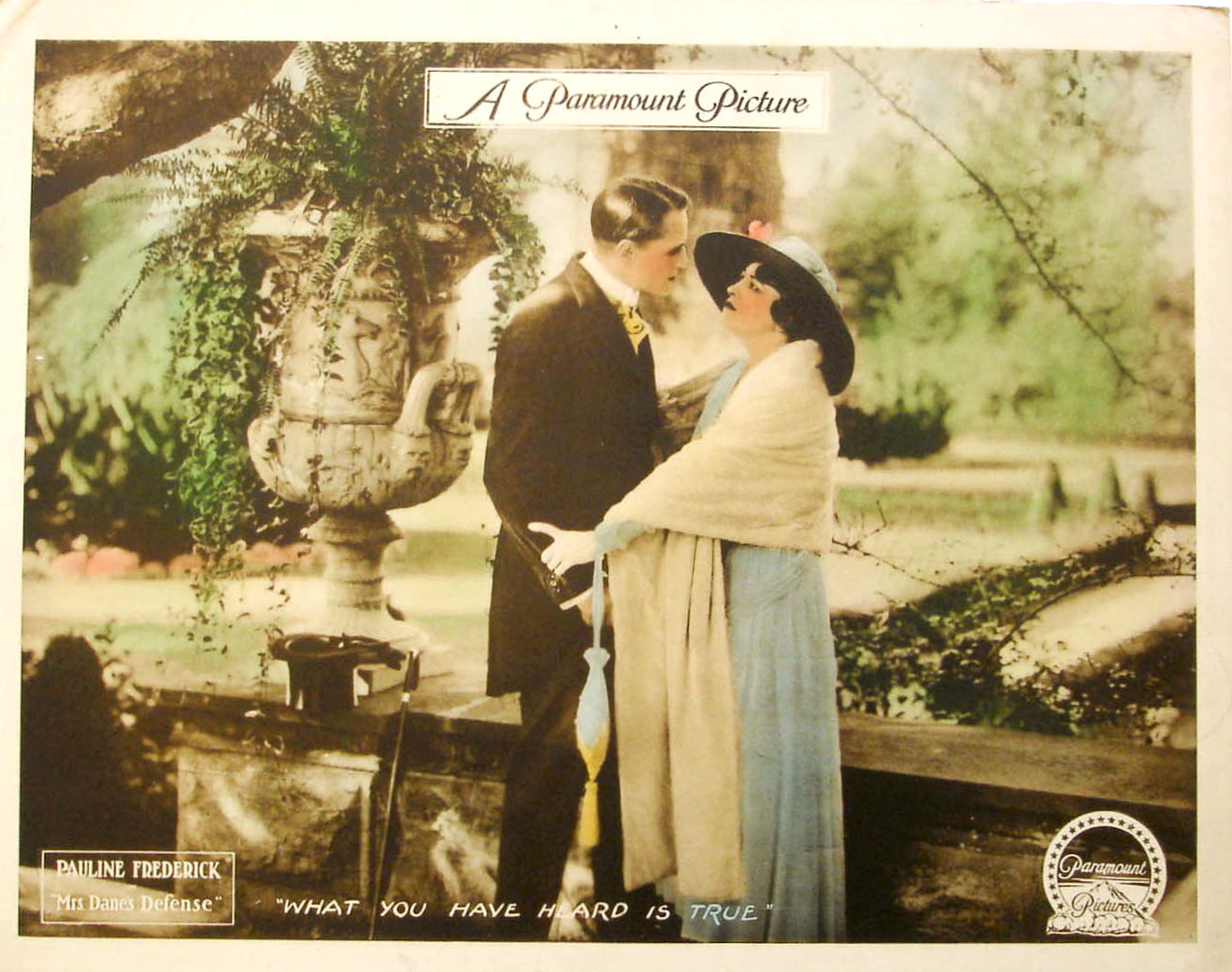
- Lobby card
- Directed by: Hugh Ford
- Screenplay by: Henry Arthur Jones (play); Margaret Turnbull
- Produced by: Adolph Zukor
- Starring: Pauline Frederick; Frank Losee; Leslie Austin; Maude Turner Gordon; Ormi Hawley; John L. Shine
- Cinematography: Ned Van Buren
- Production company: Famous Players Film Company
- Distributed by: Paramount Pictures
- Release date: January 7, 1918
- Running time: 50 minutes
- Country: United States
- Language: English

Mrs. Dane's Defense is a 1918 American drama silent film directed by Hugh Ford and written by Henry Arthur Jones and Margaret Turnbull. The film stars Pauline Frederick, Frank Losee, Leslie Austin, Maude Turner Gordon, Ormi Hawley and John L. Shine. The film was released on January 7, 1918, by Paramount Pictures.

== Cast ==
- Pauline Frederick as Felicia Hindemarsh
- Frank Losee as Sir Danile Carteret
- Leslie Austin as Lionel Carteret
- Maude Turner Gordon as Lady Eastney
- Ormi Hawley as Janet
- John L. Shine as Mr. Bulsom-Porter
- Ida Darling as Mrs. Bulsom-porter
- Cyril Chadwick as James Risbee
- Amelia Summerville as The Duchess of Grantby
- Frank Kingdon as The Vicar
- Howard Hall as Mr. Trent
- Grace Reals as Mrs. Trent
- Mary Navarro as Mrs. Dane of Canada

== Preservation ==
Mrs. Dane's Defense is currently presumed lost. In February of 2021, the film was cited by the National Film Preservation Board on their Lost U.S. Silent Feature Films list.
